= Muara Beach =

Beach in Brunei-Muara, Brunei

- Pantai Muara
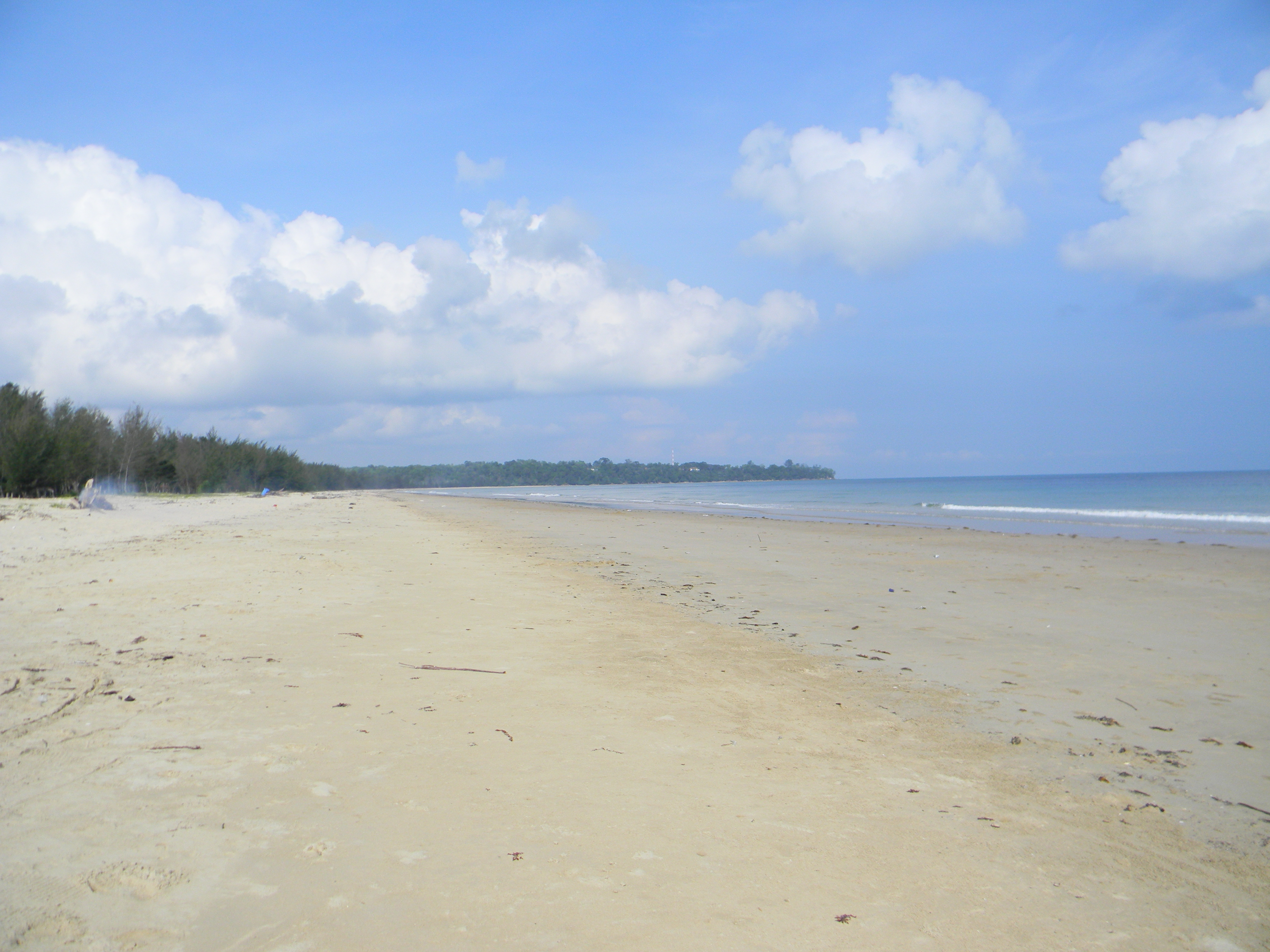

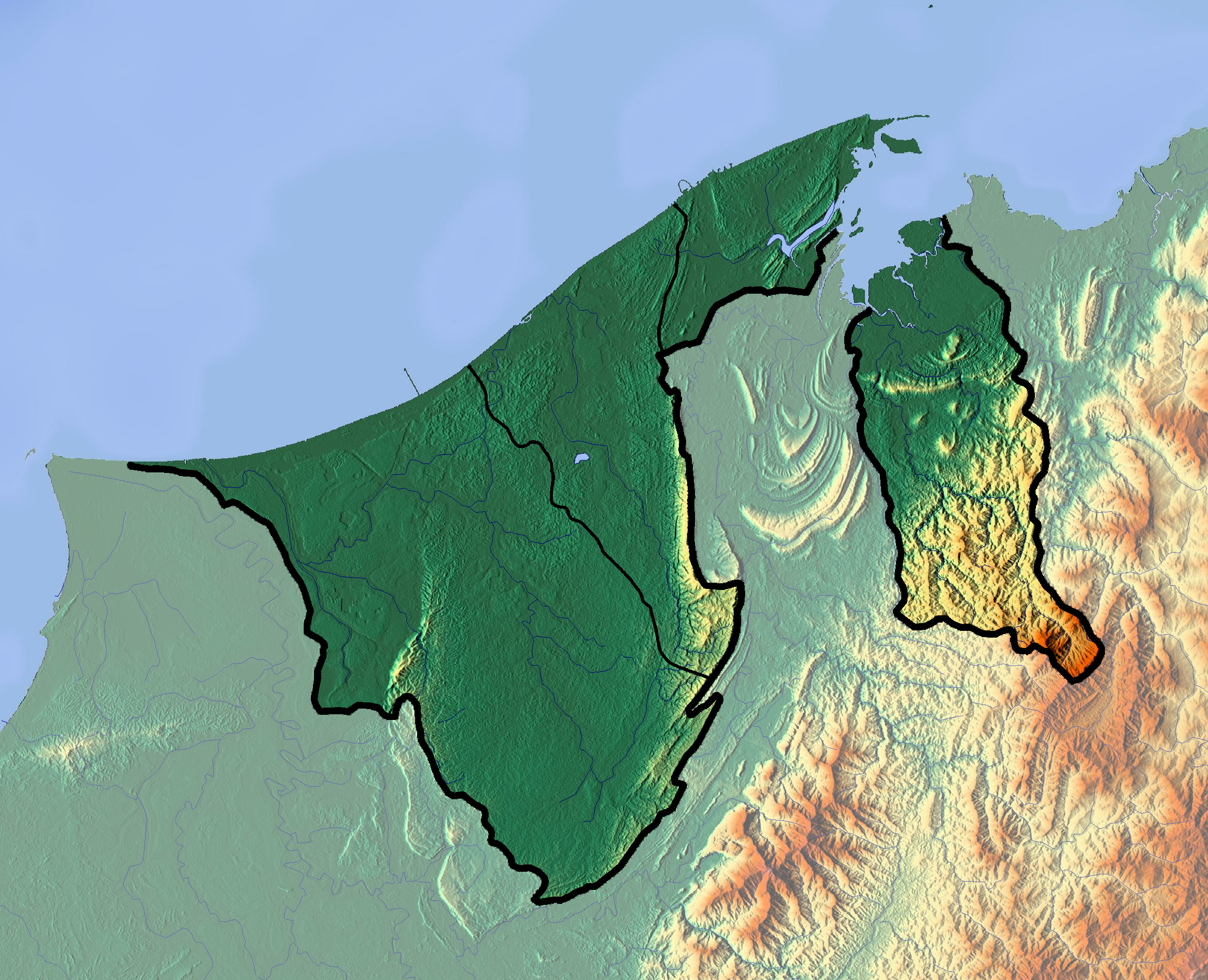
- Location within Brunei
- Location: Muara, Serasa, Brunei-Muara
- Nearest city: Bandar Seri Begawan, Brunei-Muara
- Coordinates: 5.0379012°N 115.0745247°E
- Governing body: Bandar Seri Begawan Municipal Department

Muara Beach (Malay: Pantai Muara) is a beach in Muara, Mukim Serasa, Brunei-Muara District, Brunei. The beach used to stretch up to Pelumpong Island, before they were cut apart in order to make way for easy access to Muara Port in the 1960s. The beach is located at an estimated distance of 27 km from Bandar Seri Begawan, and 3 km from Muara Port.

== History ==
On 10 June 1945, an amphibious assault was carried out at Green Beach (code for Muara Beach) during the Battle of North Borneo. Australian troops landed at Green Beach before defeating the Japanese forces, who had occupied Brunei since December 1941, capturing Brunei Town (now Bandar Seri Begawan) on 22 December 1941. The Japanese occupation was finally ended with the help of Australian forces and local guerrilla fighters. The 2/17 Australian Battalion, led by Lieutenant Colonel John Broadbent, landed on the northern side of Green Beach.

== Infrastructure ==
The 11 hectare Muara Beach Recreational Park was officially opened in 2006. It consisted of a 1.2 km track, volleyball field, beach football field, camping site and many more. The Brunei–Australia Memorial, built around 2010, is located at the recreational park, behind the Muara Naval Base's hall. Made from concrete and tiles, the memorial commemorates the Australian forces' landing during World War II. It was officially unveiled by Yasmin Umar, the deputy minister of defence, and Alan Griffin, Australia's Minister for Veterans' Affairs.
