= Kampong Serasa =

Village in Brunei

Serasa Kampung Serasa
- Village
- Kampong Serasa
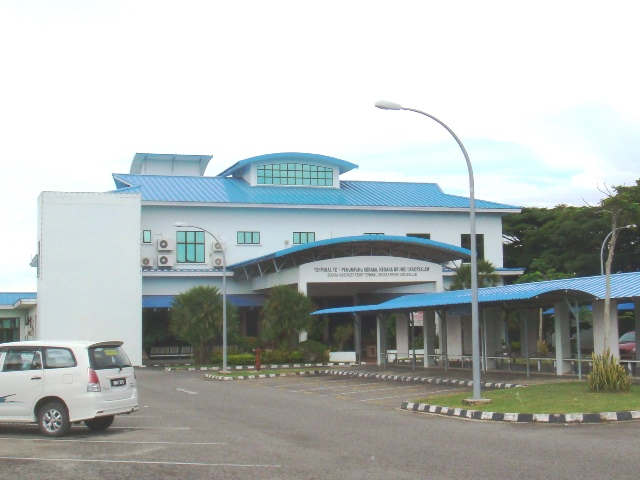

- Location in Brunei
- Coordinates: 5°00′51″N 115°03′30″E
- Country: Brunei
- District: Brunei-Muara
- Mukim: Serasa

Government
  - Village head: Abdul Hamid Zinin

Population (2016)
  - Total: 3,200
- Time zone: UTC+8 (BNT)
- Postcode: BT1728

Kampong Serasa is a village in Brunei-Muara District, Brunei, near the port town Muara. The population was 3,200 in 2016. It is home to Serasa Ferry Terminal, the country's primary international ferry terminal.

== Etymology ==
Serasa is thought to have been given its name by a group of migrant workers who arrived at one of the village's waterways. They took some of the pucuk gajus (cashew leaves) and pucuk pawas (sprouts) as side dishes when they stopped to rest and eat their prepared pais-paisan meals. They discovered the taste of the pucuk-pucuk to be serasa (fitted to their palates), after eating it. They settled there and gave the river the name Serasa. As these people originated from Indonesia's Sebatik Island, the town was briefly known as Kampong Sebatik.

== Geography ==
Kampong Serasa is located in the north-easternmost part of Brunei-Muara District. It is one of the villages within Mukim Serasa. It comprises the original village settlement and the public housing estate Kampong Perpindahan Serasa. It also encompasses Serasa Industrial Site, one of the dedicated industrial estates in the country. The village has the postcode BT1728.

== History ==
According to folktales, there are Muara inhabitants who reside in a community known as Kampong Dadap. These locals migrated around during the Japanese occupation, and some constructed homes and mosques in an area known as Biawak River (Sungai Biawak) along the banks of the river mouth. The mosque in the town of Biawak River sustained damage following the end of the Second World War. The name of Kampong Sungai Biawak was changed by the people to Kampong Masjid Lama in order to preserve memories. Residents have been relocated to Kampong Serasa, due to the port's expanding expansion.

== Economy ==
The Majlis Perundingan Kampung (MPK) generates goods from marine sources in accordance with the position of the village near to the landing spot of ships and fishing boats in an effort to help the Ministry of Home Affairs' ambition to achieve the 1K1P Program. Producing raw lumai tamban, lumai salted fish, lumai tamban snacks, tahai, lumai lekor crackers, and lumai fish crackers. The procurement of a cracker-making machine was made possible by a BND42,000 funding from the Brunei and Muara District Department. With the use of this equipment, MPK created up to 2,500 boxes of fish and shrimp crackers each month, depending on market demand. Assisting in advise and direction on product quality assurance and packaging are the Departments of Fisheries and Agriculture and Food.

== Demography ==
The residents of these villages are made up of various races and tribes such as the Malays, the Kedayan, the Chinese and others.

== Transportation ==
=== Water ===
Serasa Ferry Terminal is the main international ferry terminal in Brunei. It mainly serves passengers arriving from and departing to Labuan and Kota Kinabalu in Malaysia by sea. The terminal recorded an annual average of 60,000 tourist arrivals from these destinations.

== Infrastructure ==
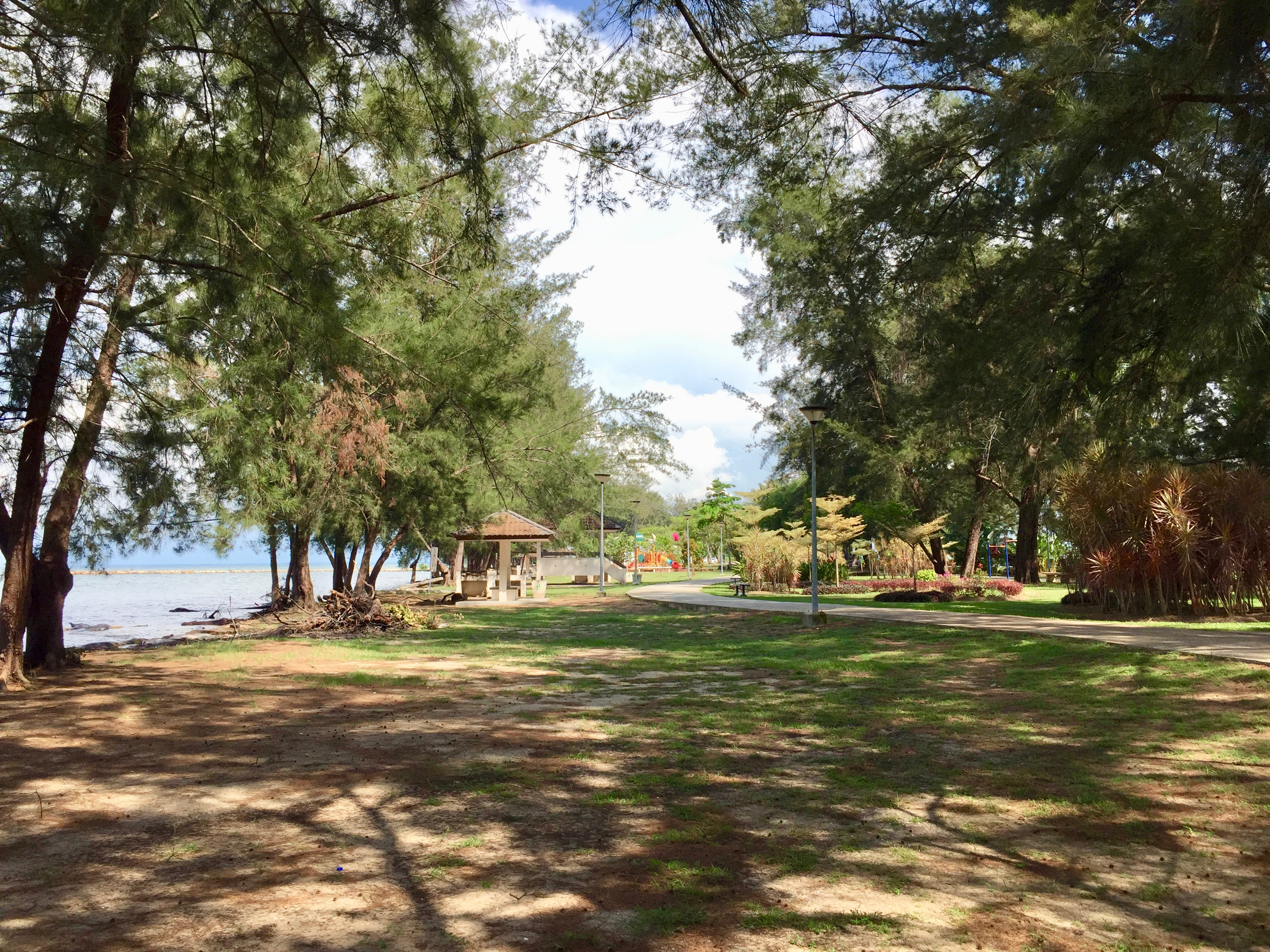
Serasa Beach

With the construction of the Temburong Bridge, which spans the Brunei Bay for approximately 30 kilometers, connecting Muara with Jalan Labu in the Temburong District and Jalan Utama Mentiri in the Serasa and Muara areas, development in those areas is accelerating rapidly. It is one of the biggest national projects and is anticipated to be finished in 2019. Also built, a connecting bridge of approximately 2.7 kilometers to Pulau Muara Besar, where the Hengyi Industries integrated Oil and Aromatic Refinery is now based, which is the single largest Foreign Direct Investment (FDI) in Brunei.

=== Education ===
- Serasa Primary School, the village's government primary school
- Pengiran Muda Abdul Azim Religious School, the village's government school for the country's Islamic religious primary education.
- Pengiran Isteri Hajjah Mariam Secondary School, the government secondary school for the residents in Mukim Serasa.

=== Places of interest ===
- Serasa Beach has been one of the attractive recreational beaches in the country. It is suitable to have a picnic with family or friends while watching the beauty of the sunset on the Western horizon or watching members of the Royal Yacht Club steer their sailboats.
- Kampong Perpindahan Serasa Mosque, inaugurated on 28 August 1987 and can accommodate 500 worshippers.
