= Serasa Ferry Terminal =

Commercial ferry terminal in Serasa, Brunei-Muara District, Brunei

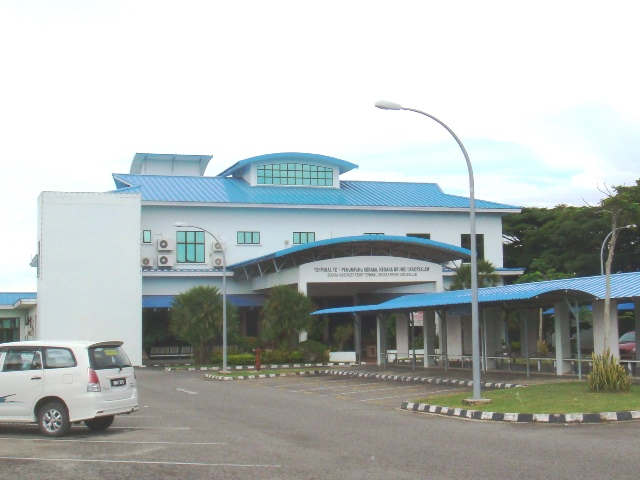
- Serasa Ferry Terminal in 2013
- Click on the map for a fullscreen view

Location
- Country: Brunei
- Location: Serasa, Brunei-Muara
- Coordinates: 5°00′54″N 115°03′56″E

Details
- Opened: 8 October 2008; 16 years ago
- Operated by: Maritime and Port Authority Brunei Darussalam

Statistics
- Vessel arrivals: 17 (2007)
- Website www.pkljaya.com/timetable.htm

The Serasa Ferry Terminal (Malay: Feri Terminal Serasa), also known as Serasa Muara Terminal and Serasa Terminal, is a passenger terminal operated by the Department of Immigration and National Registration in Mukim Serasa, Brunei-Muara District, Brunei. It is one of the two ferry terminals in Brunei, which is located in Kuala Belait Port and Serasa.

== Geography ==
The terminal sits at an estimated distance of 20–25 km from Bandar Seri Begawan. Moreover, the passenger terminal took passengers from Brunei to Labuan, Lawas and Sundar, while the car ferry terminal is connected to Menumbok.

== History ==
In March 2005, the Serasa Vehicle Ferry Terminal was planned to be completed. The original terminal had 300,000 travelers a year. In 2007, the terminal was renovated to accommodate up to 500 passengers per hour and with several new facilities. On 18 October 2008, the Serasa Ferry Terminal opened for service. On 30 December 2009, Serasa Vehicle Ferry Terminal opened for business.

== Gallery ==
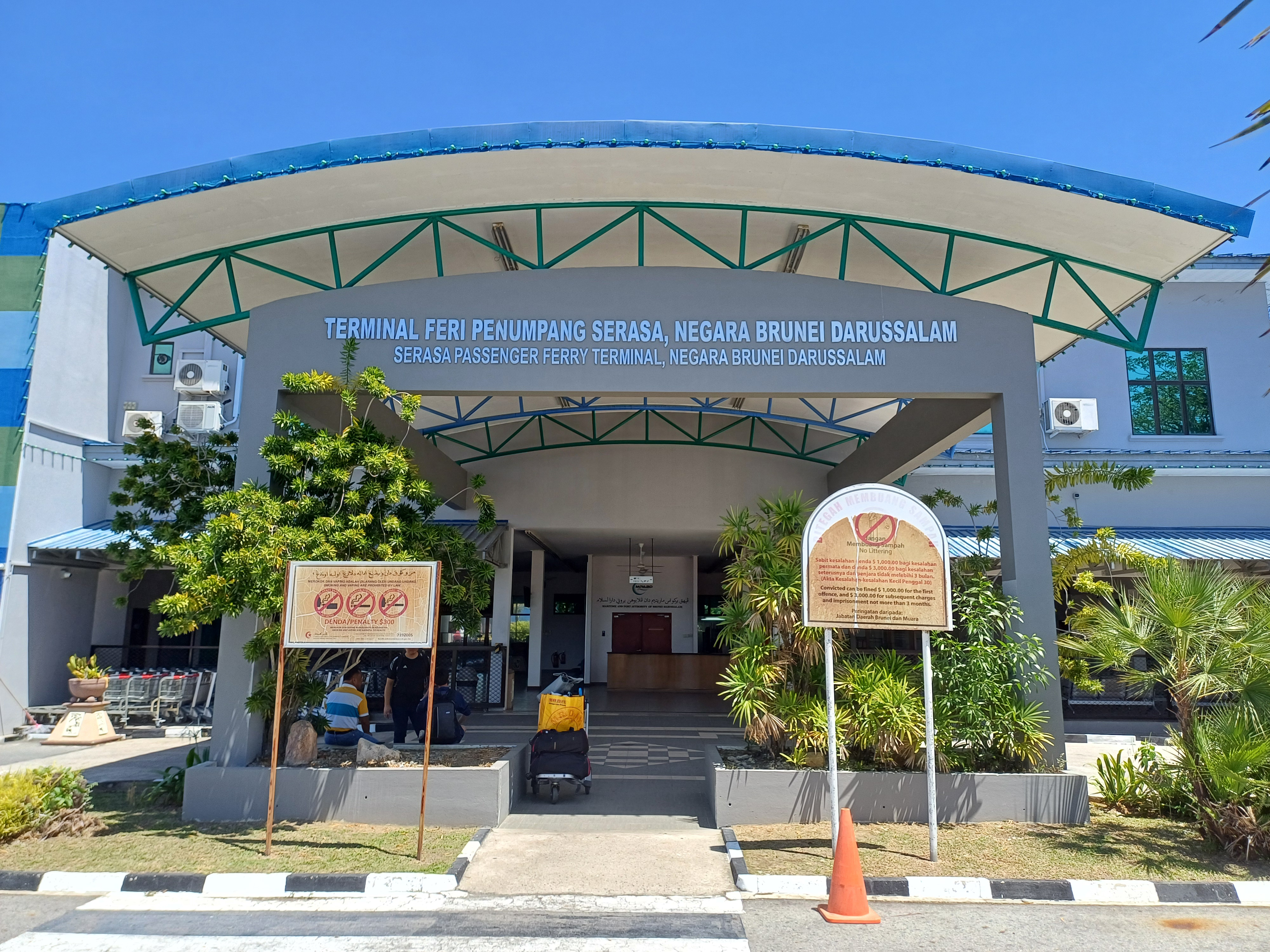
Main entrance of the terminal building

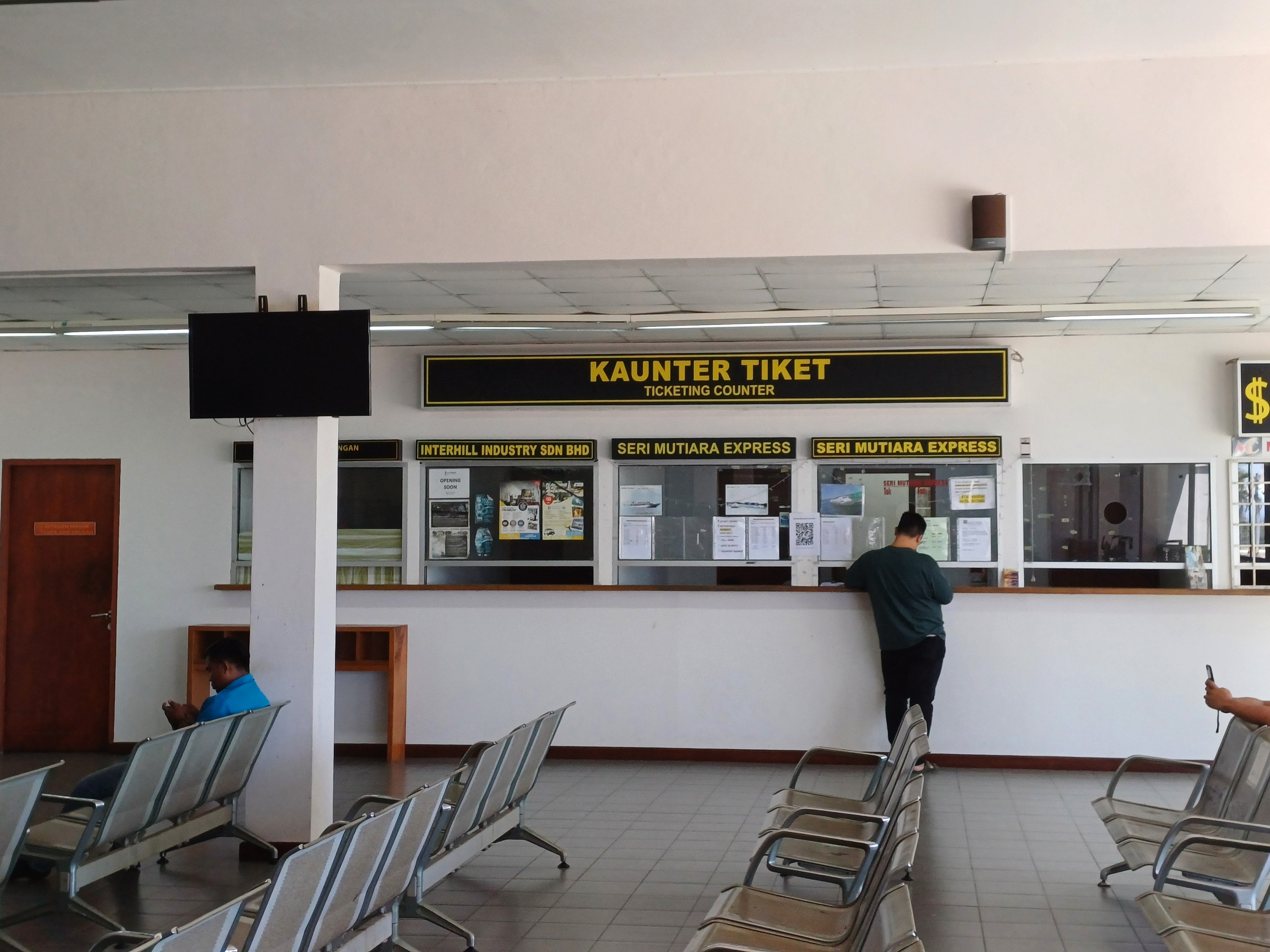
Ticket counter

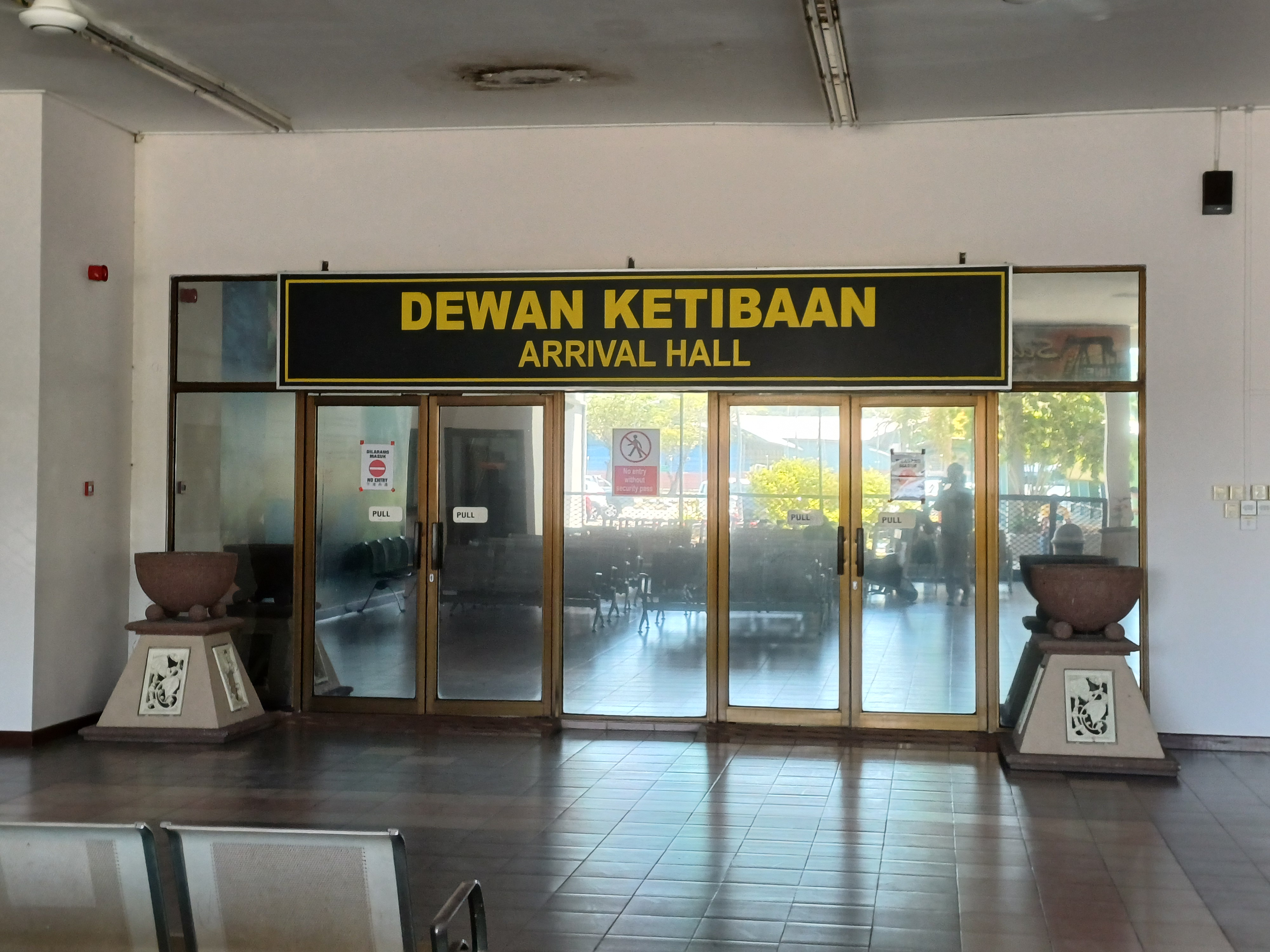
Arrival hall

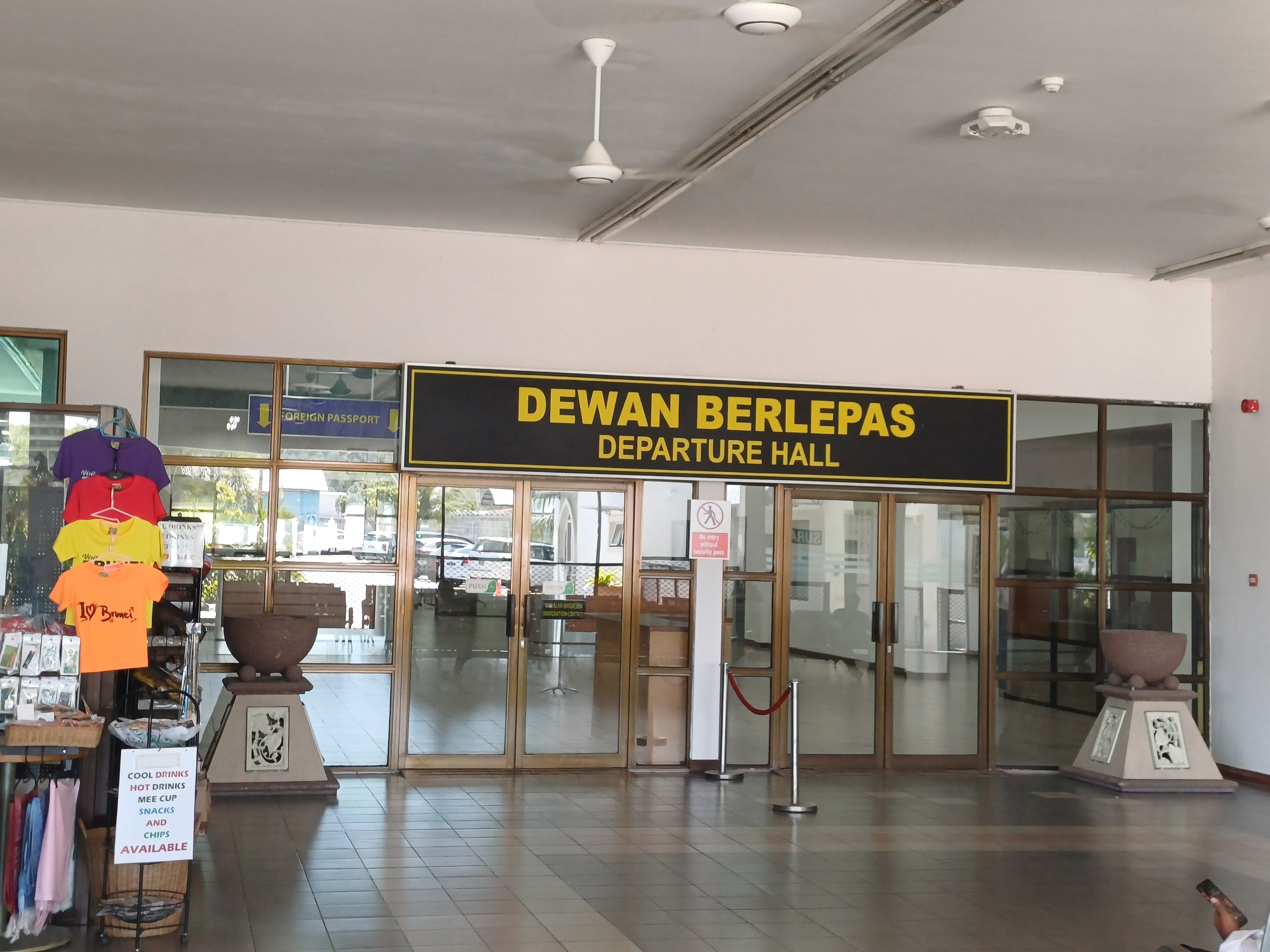
Departure hall
