= Muara, Brunei =

Town in Brunei

Muara
- Town
- Pekan Muara ڤكن موارا
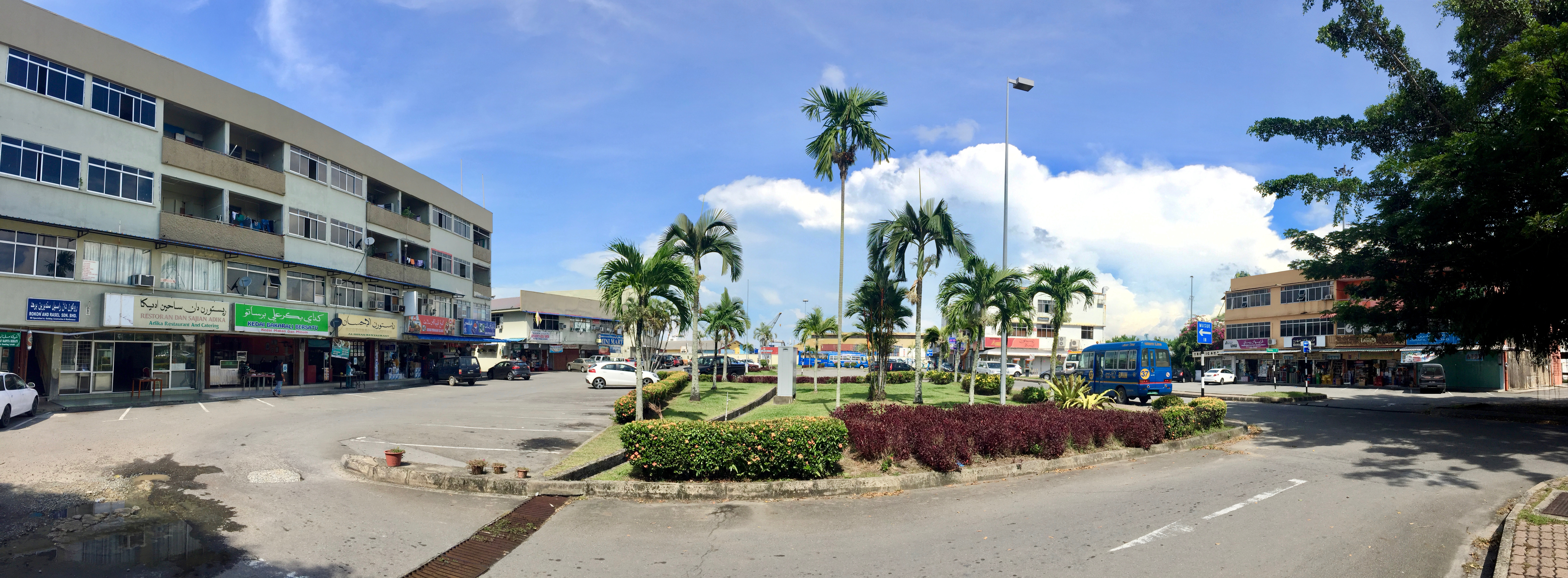
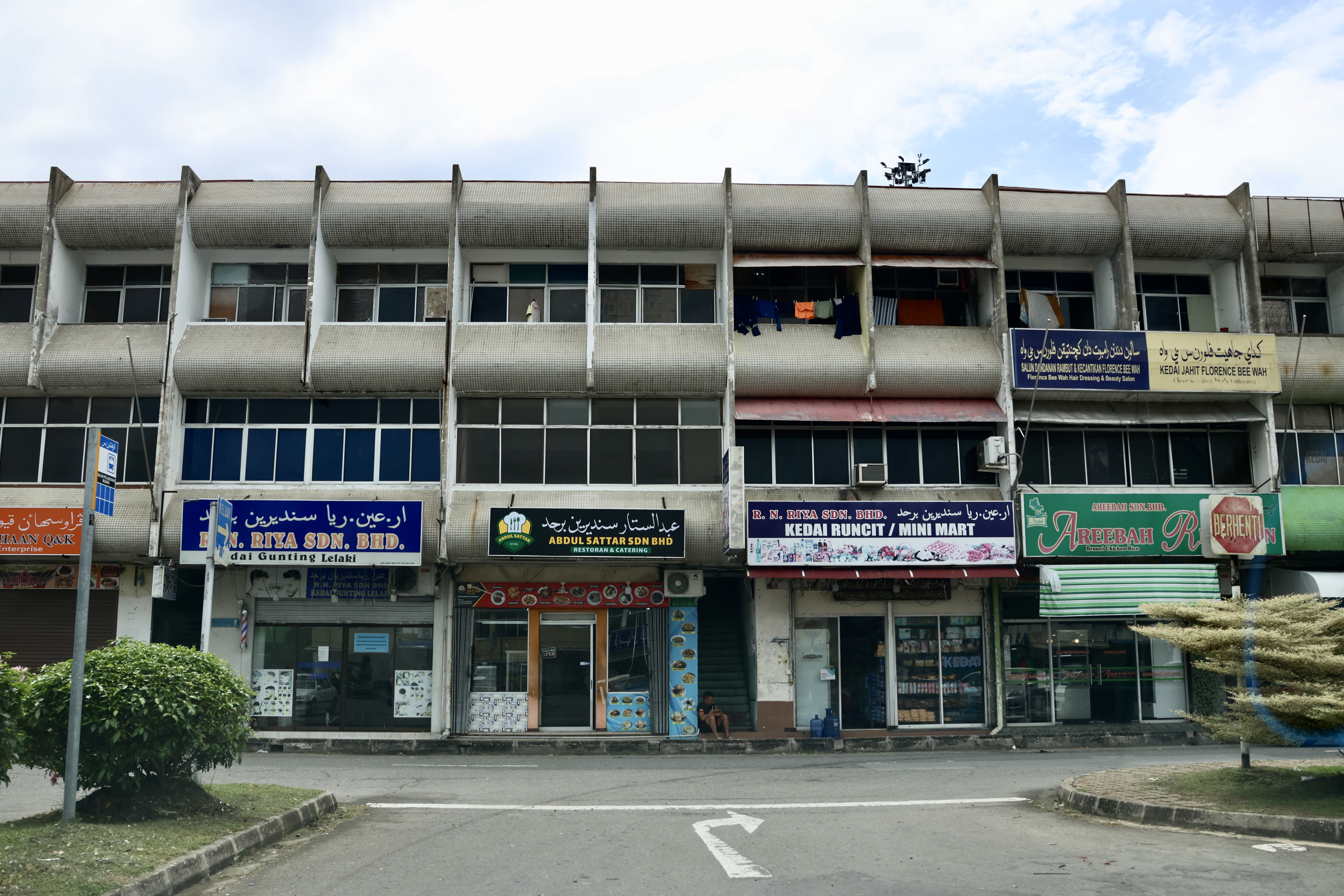
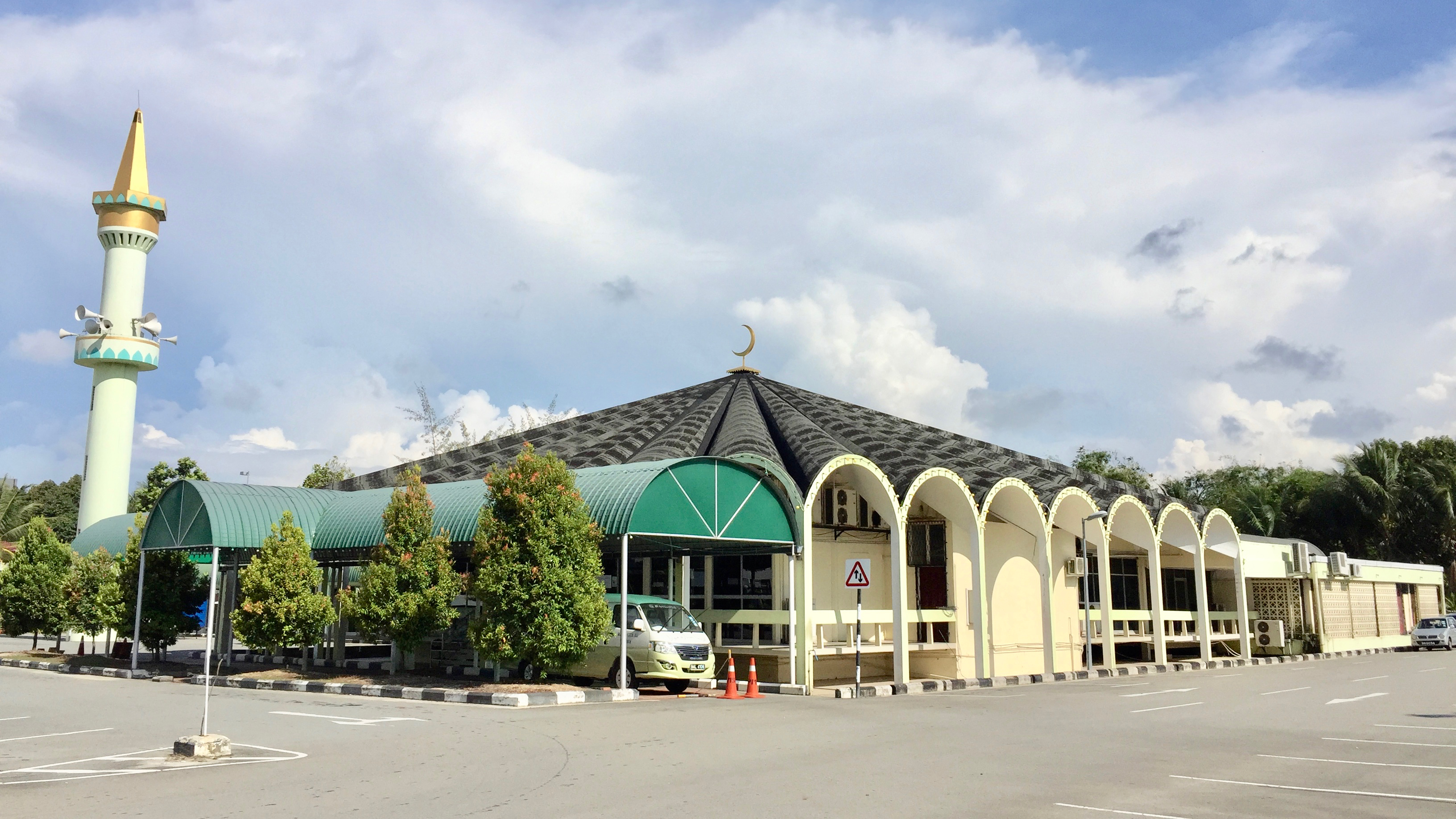
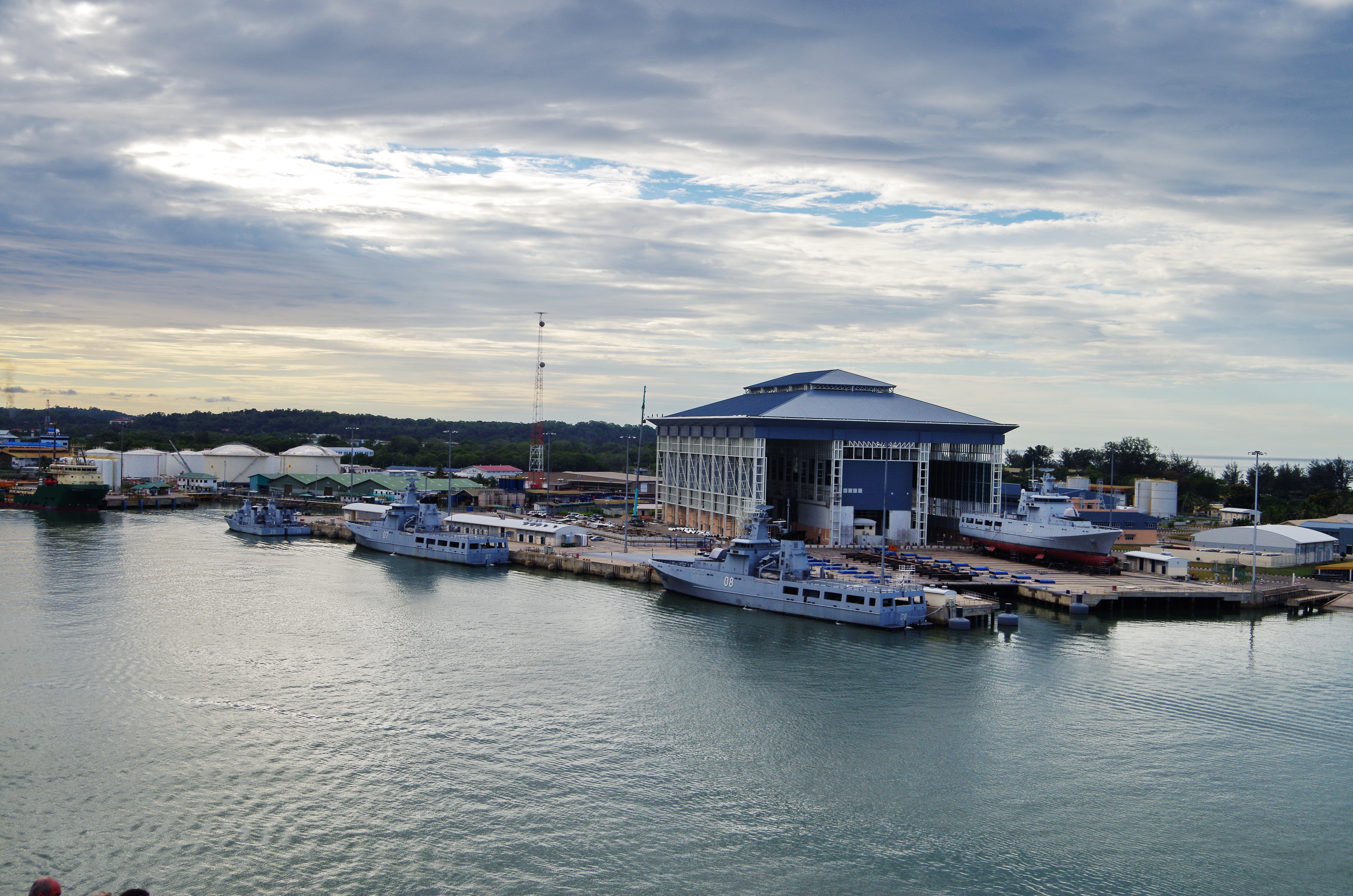
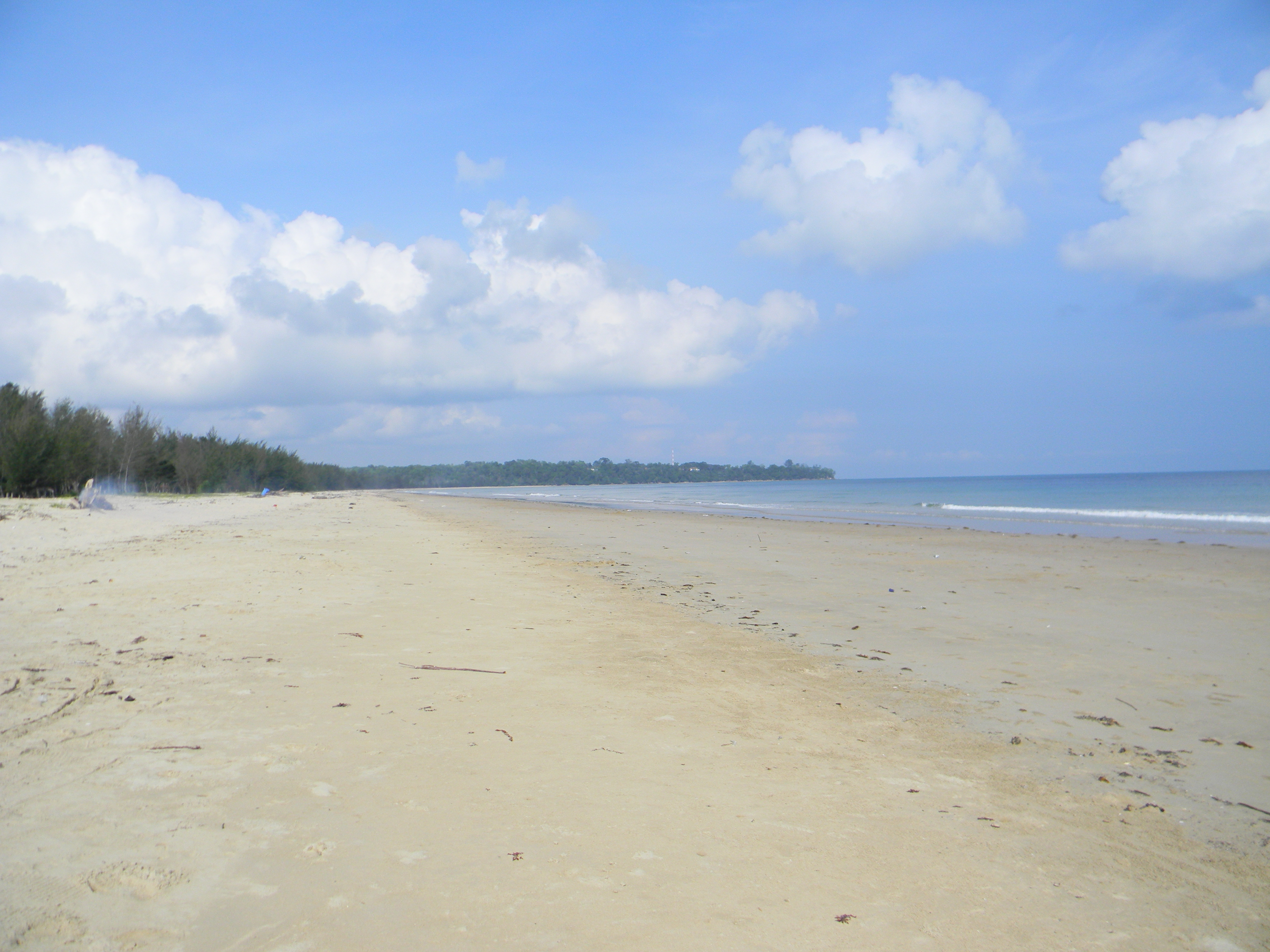
- Clockwise from top: Town centre, Setia Ali Mosque, Muara Naval Base, Muara Beach, shophouses

- Location in Brunei
- Coordinates: 5°01′36″N 115°04′09″E
- Country: Brunei
- District: Brunei–Muara
- Mukim: Serasa
- First settled: 19th century
- Founder: William Cowie

Government
  - Village head: Shahminan Abdul Rahman

Population (2021)
  - Total: 2,539
- Time zone: UTC+8 (BNT)
- Postcode: BT1128

Muara, (Note: moo-WAH-rah; Jawi: موارا; Chinese: 摩拉县; pinyin: Mólā) officially known as Muara Town (Malay: Pekan Muara), is a port town located in the Brunei–Muara District, approximately 28 kilometres (17 mi) from the capital, Bandar Seri Begawan. As of 2021, the population of the town was 2,539. Muara is officially classified as a settlement under Mukim Serasa, and its postcode is BT1128.

== Etymology ==
Muara, originally known as Muara Damit, later became known as Brooketon, named after Rajah Charles Brooke's colliery. The name "Muara" is derived from the Malay word for river mouth, reflecting the town's location at the entrance to a large river in Brunei. Like many other coastal muara settlements, "Muara" are typically situated at a river confluence, at the head of the estuary, or in the close coastal hinterland. This strategic positioning allowed the settlement to control access to the river, defend against potential sea attacks, and benefit from trade and river transportation.

== Geography ==
The geography of Muara is characterised by a variety of soil types, including grey-white podzolics, podzols, regosols, and sandy soils, which are found along the northern coastal strip stretching from Kuala Belait to Muara Port. The man-made Serasa Beach spit, formed from dredged sands, encloses Serasa Bay, located just north of the Brunei River estuary, close to Muara Port. From Muara in the north to Kuala Belait in the south, Brunei boasts an extensive stretch of sandy beaches, with only a few rocky headlands in the Muara and Jerudong regions. East of Serasa Bay, the coastline is dominated by mangroves, and small beaches with fine-grained sand, ranging from 50 to 150 metres (160 to 490 ft) wide, dot the landscape. The total length of these beaches, including the sandy islands of Pelompong Spit and Pulau Muara Besar (PMB), extends over 194 kilometres.

The Pelompong Spit, located near Muara, stretches 7.5 kilometres from the mainland and is bisected by a channel that provides access to Muara Port. The spit is protected by breakwaters on both sides. Despite some areas experiencing erosion, the spit and the neighbouring island are made up of closely spaced beach ridges, which mark the former coastline. Unlike the westerly longshore drift found on Brunei's western coast, the longshore drift in this region is directed either easterly or northeasterly.

== History ==
=== Coal mining and sovereignty struggles ===
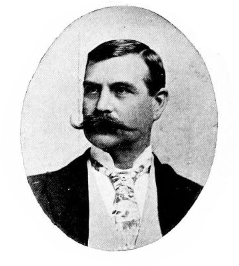
Portrait of Cowie in c. 1899

The Muara District, located at the mouth of the Brunei River, is composed of two main areas: Muara Besar (Great Muara), an island, and Muara Damit (Little Muara), a portion of the mainland. In the early 1880s, William Cowie shifted his focus to Brunei after exhausting the coal resources in Labuan. Representing "Cowie and Company," he negotiated a series of agreements between 1882 and 1887, securing exclusive rights to mine coal in the Muara District. These agreements also granted him the authority to levy taxes and collect land rents. However, tensions arose when the British North Borneo Company (BNBC) took control of the region, prompting Cowie to seek the transfer of his rights to the BNBC.

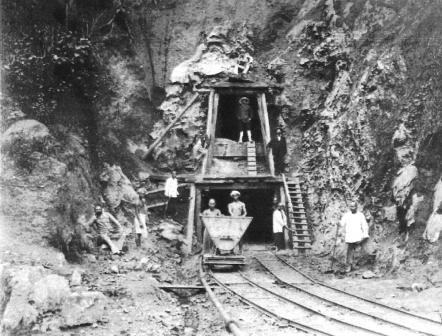
Labourers at the Brooketon colliery in the 19th century

In 1887, Sultan Hashim Jalilul Alam Aqamaddin, facing financial difficulties, considered selling the Limbang area to Sarawak. Although Sarawak offered $20,000 (Straits) for the land, the British government intervened, blocking the cession pending further investigation. During this period, Brooke was also pursuing control over coastal lands, including Muara, and directed his agents to halt any negotiations for Limbang.

The following year, in 1888, Cowie sold his rights in Muara Damit, including the coal mining concessions, to Brooke for £25,000. Though Cowie profited significantly, he cleverly ensured that Brooke would pay an additional sum for previously undisclosed rights to control essential supplies. While this transfer was never officially authorised by the British government, it went unnoticed until it was too late for any intervention.

Initially governed as a Crown Colony, Muara came under the control of the BNBC in 1889 due to financial issues. The BNBC's representative was appointed governor of Labuan, pending the British government's approval. Despite Brunei's territory shrinking due to repeated cessions to Sarawak and the BNBC, Muara remained under nominal Brunei sovereignty. However, Rajah Brooke, who was involved in coal mining in Muara Damit (also known as Brooketon), effectively took control, diminishing the sultan's authority in the region.

By the end of the 19th century, during a period of instability, Rajah Brooke governed Muara Damit as if it were part of Sarawak, which was legally incorrect, as the area remained within Brunei's domain. The British consul in Brunei quickly raised concerns, noting that Brooke was exercising jurisdiction in Brunei's territory. This situation could not be allowed to continue, particularly given concerns about the potential recognition of slavery in the Muaras, which had been banned throughout Brunei.

Despite Brunei's efforts to restore its sovereignty, Brooke maintained a strong presence in Muara into the early 20th century. While he was eventually required to dissolve his administration at the mouth of the Brunei River, he continued to control revenue rights, excluding poll taxes and shipping duties. He resisted Brunei's attempts to impose a coal export duty by threatening to shut down his unprofitable mine. In 1915, coal from the Brooketon mine in Muara constituted a significant portion of Brunei's income, accounting for 28% of export revenue. However, under a lease agreement between Brooke and Sultan Muhammad Jamalul Alam II, ownership of the coal rested with Sarawak. Brooke financed and managed the mines, while Brunei derived income from royalties on the coal exports. By 1924, Brooke had relinquished his revenue rights, and in the early 1930s, he surrendered his land rights, except for a bungalow.

From 1909 to 1932, Muara was traditionally recognised as one of Brunei's six districts. In 1937, an attempt to sell the rights to James Hatton Hall was unsuccessful, following the closure of the Brooketon colliery in 1924, which had led many residents to relocate to Miri and Adong in Sarawak. In 1938, Muara merged with Brunei District to form the Brunei–Muara District, which subsequently became the nation's most populated district and the site of Brunei Town (present-day Bandar Seri Begawan). By the late 1950s, when Sir Steven Runciman visited the area, "little remained of Brooketon," as the village had been reclaimed by jungle.

=== Japanese occupation and aftermath ===
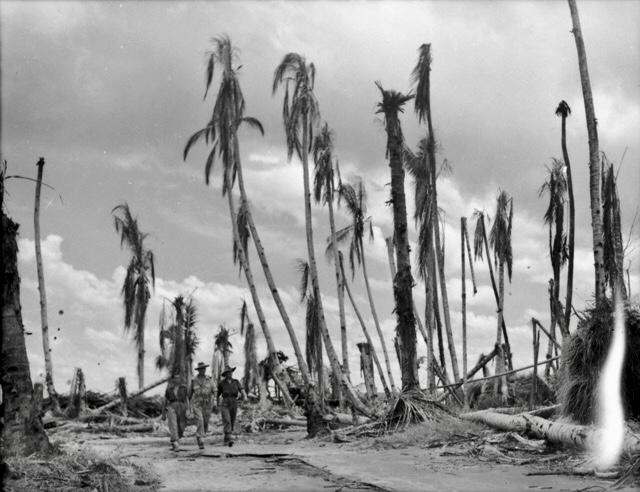
Destruction in Brooketon in 1945

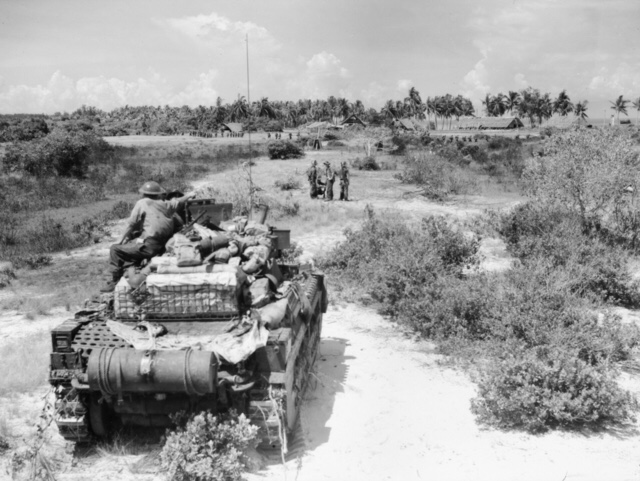
An Australian Matilda II tank approaching Brooketon in 1945

When 10,000 soldiers of the Japanese Kawaguchi Detachment arrived in Kuala Belait on 16 December 1941, they swiftly and without resistance occupied Brunei within six days. The small fishing and trading community on PMB was completely destroyed as the Japanese planned to use the island as a base for refitting and refueling their ships. During the occupation, the road connecting Brunei Town to Muara was completed, forming part of the Japanese strategic road network, which also included plans for an oil pipeline to Muara.

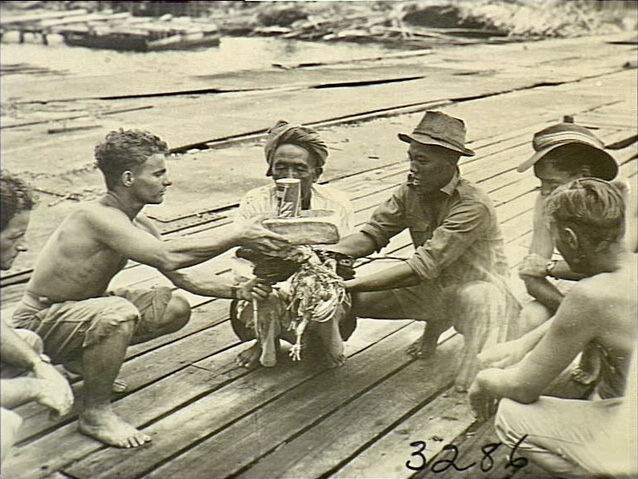
Barter trading between an Australian and local Malay while watched by an Indian in 1945

On 10 June 1945, as part of Operation Oboe Six, the 9th Australian Division launched a coordinated landing at Muara to reclaim Brunei's resources and prepare for further operations in Malaya and Japan. After the landing, Japanese forces retreated inland, where they were ultimately defeated by a local guerrilla force supported by Allied officers. This operation was a pivotal step in liberating the region from Japanese occupation, culminating in the surrender of the Japanese commander in September 1945.

In the post-war period of 1946, fishing became the primary livelihood for residents of Muara and other coastal communities in Brunei, with Chinese merchants managing the industry's financing, marketing, and dried prawn preparation and export. The Brunei–Muara route was maintained despite widespread neglect of roads during the war. Broken bridges posed challenges, but innovative solutions included using steel plates and abandoned oil pipes to construct functional substitutes. Meanwhile, the Allied bombardment in 1945 left Muara's police station completely destroyed, necessitating temporary arrangements to house the police force until new, permanent structures were constructed.

=== Post-war development ===
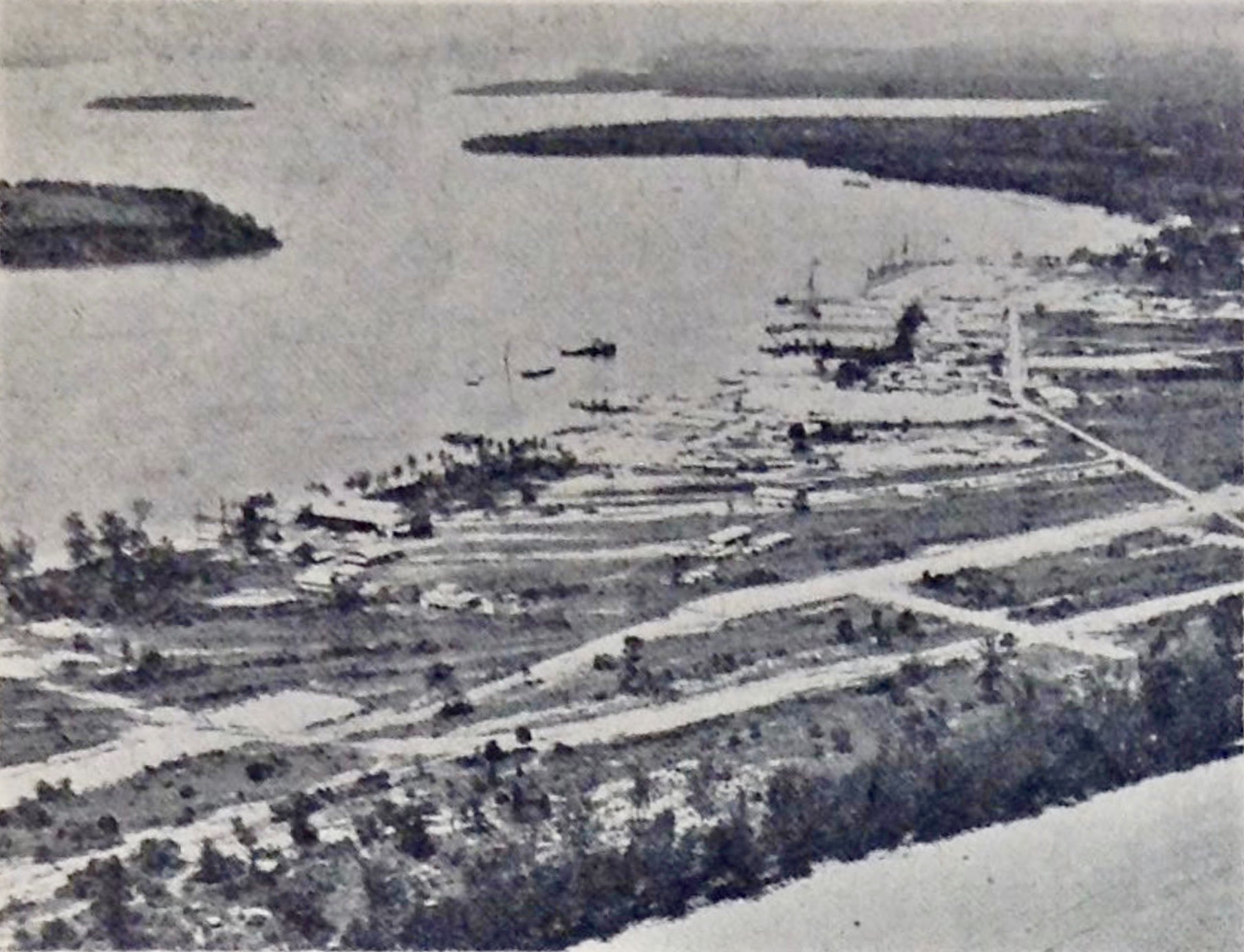
Aerial photograph of Muara in 1970

In 1953, the Muara Slipway and Engineering Company, a private firm granted permission to rebuild the former government-owned slipway in Muara, began servicing ships of up to 200 tons. By 1955, the company had handled 1,145.5 tons of shipping through hull and engine overhauls. Due to its short carriage rail length, the slipway could only accommodate shallow draft vessels. The repair facilities at Muara provided a valuable service, allowing government and commercial launches to avoid the four-hour journey across Brunei Bay to the port of Labuan or the 700-mile trip to Kuching, Sarawak.

The approval of the Muara Port Scheme in 1958 was a pivotal decision that would ultimately influence the future of Brunei's port infrastructure. Experts determined that constructing a deep-sea port at Muara would be far more cost-effective than attempting to develop a channel to Brunei Town's wharf capable of accommodating large oceangoing vessels. As part of this development, plans were made to establish a new power station in Muara to ensure a continuous 24-hour electricity supply. The station would be equipped with a 12 KW unmanned generating set and a 75 kW generating set, providing the necessary power to support the growing port and surrounding infrastructure.

Under the rule of Sultan Omar Ali Saifuddin III, the area was developed into a deepwater port to support the country's growth. In the early 1970s, the deepwater port of Muara was further developed, and a canal was dredged to improve access to the port, which resulted in Pelumpong Island becoming an isolated island. To prevent silting, concrete or boulder armouring was applied, and the boulder groynes were extended seaward on both sides of the channel between 1970 and 1973. Since then, Muara Port has undergone extensive improvements, including wharf extensions, the addition of long storage warehouses, open storage space, and facilities for a dedicated container wharf.

== Economy ==
=== Fishing ===
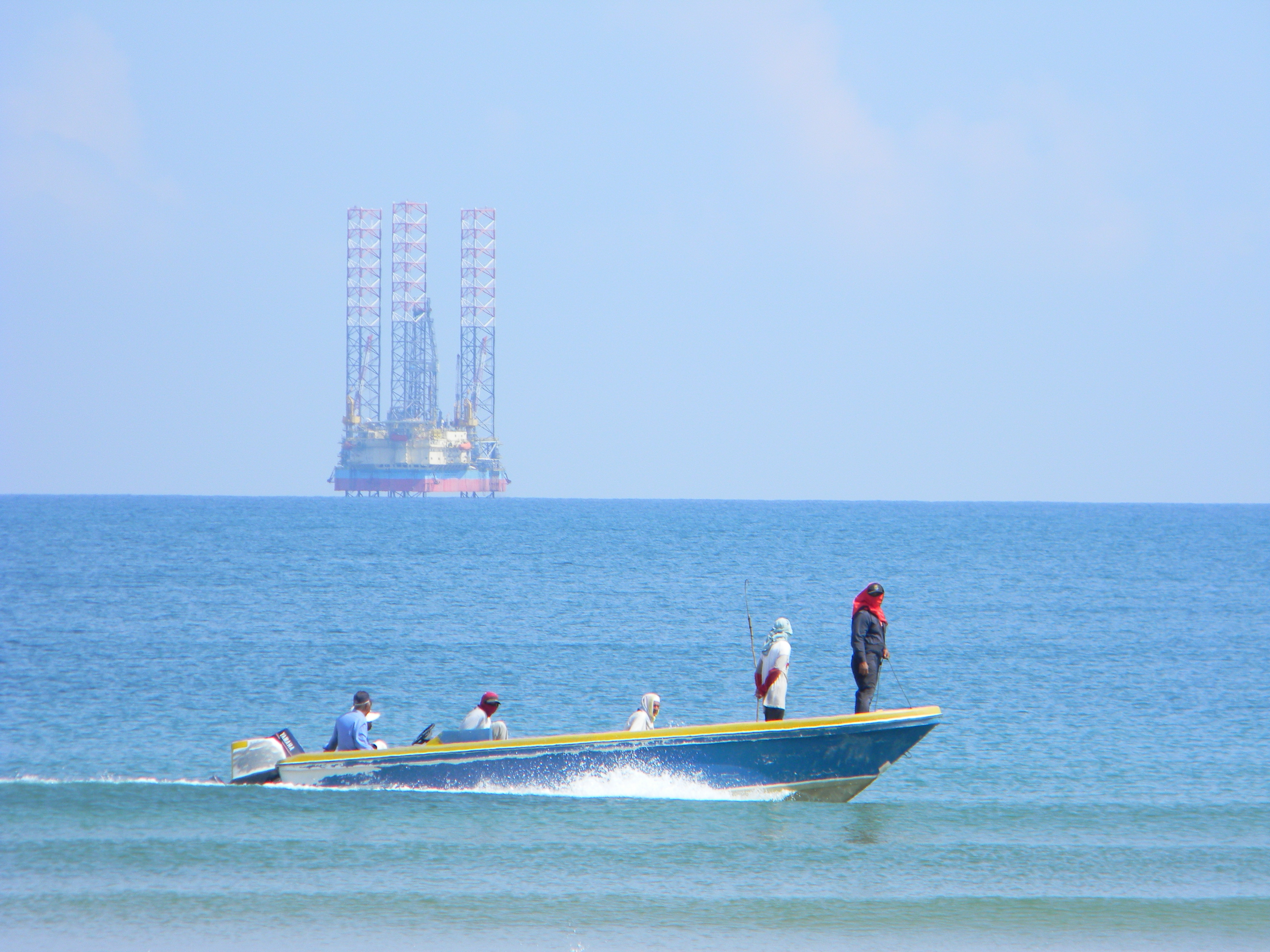
Brunei fishermen off Muara in 2010

Muara, a key hub for Brunei's fishing industry, features a fish market as part of a nationwide network of seven markets. These markets are strategically located near jetties or densely populated areas to facilitate the sale and transfer of catches. To foster the development of integrated fisheries businesses, which connect the catch and aquaculture industry with processing, marketing, and support services, the government has introduced a five-point plan. This initiative ensures that fish unsuitable for the domestic market are processed into exportable products. As a result, the fishing sector's contribution to Brunei's GDP has seen substantial growth, rising from B$12.3 million in 1984 to $46.9 million in 2008, with a peak of $86.4 million in 2005.

=== One Village, One Product ===
Muara town's economy is supported by both traditional industries and modern development initiatives. Notably, the Lumai Fish Snack Project, led by the Village Consultative Council (MPK), focuses on producing and marketing local fish snacks as part of the "One Village, One Product" initiative. Additionally, the Muara Leisure Festival helps promote the town's cultural and social assets, while fostering cooperation among villagers and attracting visitors. The festival also supports vulnerable groups, including orphans and single mothers, through collaboration with government and private sector partners. These efforts contribute to Muara's economic development and community well-being.

=== Pulau Muara Besar ===
Muara Town's economy has undergone significant transformation due to the PMB project, establishing the area as a hub for downstream industrial activities. Launched in 2017, the project commenced trial production in 2019, producing diesel, JetA-1, petroleum, and liquefied petroleum gas. It is spearheaded by the Hengyi Brunei PMB project, one of Brunei's most substantial foreign direct investment undertakings. Full-scale operations were projected to commence by late 2019 or early 2020. The project has been integrated into Brunei's energy sector through agreements with Brunei Shell Petroleum (BSP) for crude oil supply and Brunei Shell Marketing for local fuel distribution.

== Transportation ==
=== Ports ===
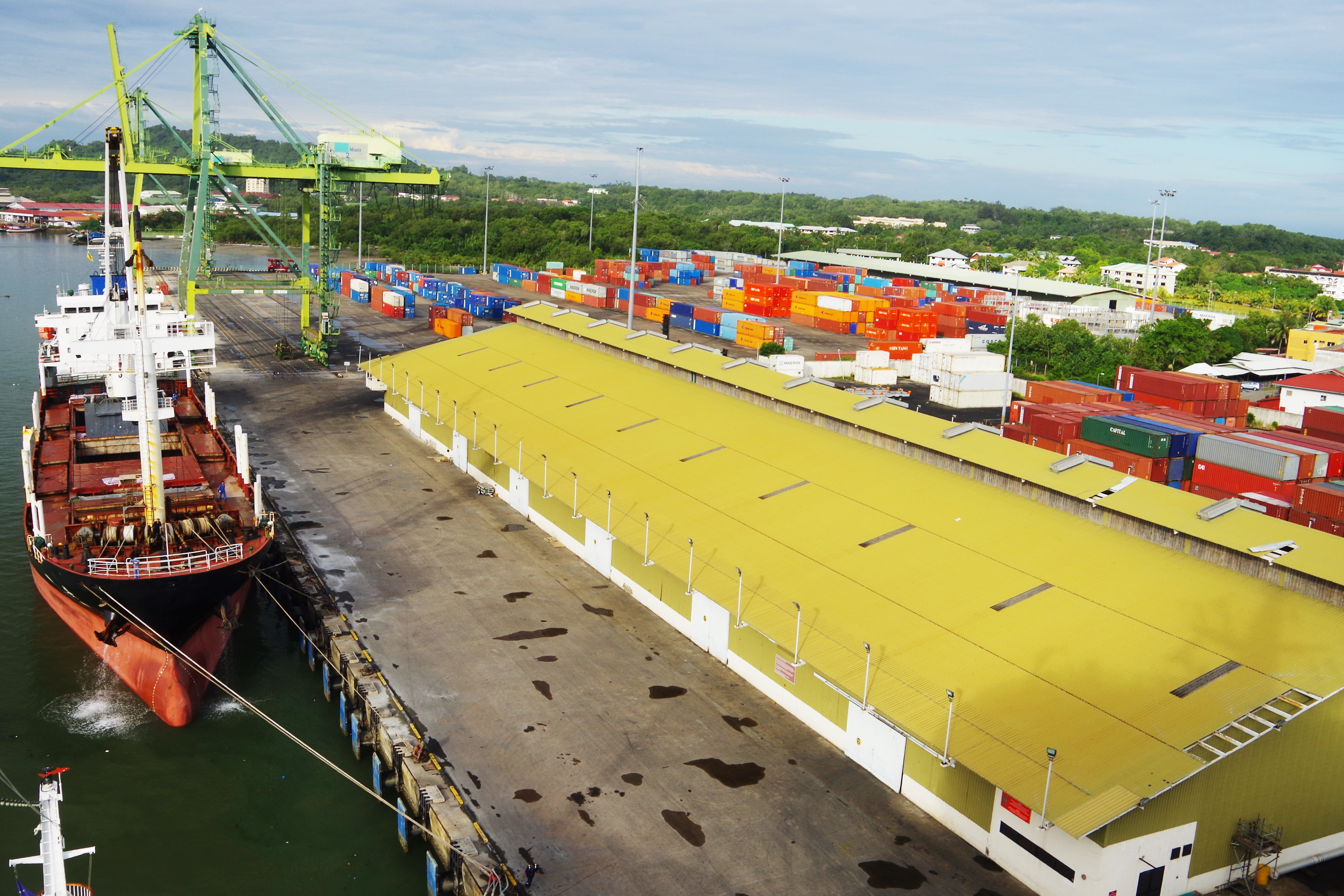
Ship docked at Muara Port in 2013

Muara Port began commercial operations in February 1973 and was officially commissioned on 1 May 1974, with the Ports Department taking over its management in 1986. The Muara Container Terminal, initially operated by PSA International, was handed over to the Brunei government in April 2007. The terminal features a 250m container berth and a maximum draft of 12.5m. Plans for further development include dredging the Muara cut, expanding port facilities on PMB, and constructing the Pulau Muara Besar Bridge to connect it to the mainland. The port plays a part in the 21st century Maritime Silk Road and the Belt and Road Initiative, connecting Brunei to major global shipping routes.

== Infrastructure ==
As of 1987, the area around Muara underwent significant urban development, with industrial zones including the Takehira Shipyard and the Muara Industrial Estate, which encompassed a port extension and cement plant. Additionally, Muara was considered for a fish landing complex and an aquaculture facility. The region also featured expanding residential areas, as well as opportunities for further recreational development along the coast.

=== Military ===
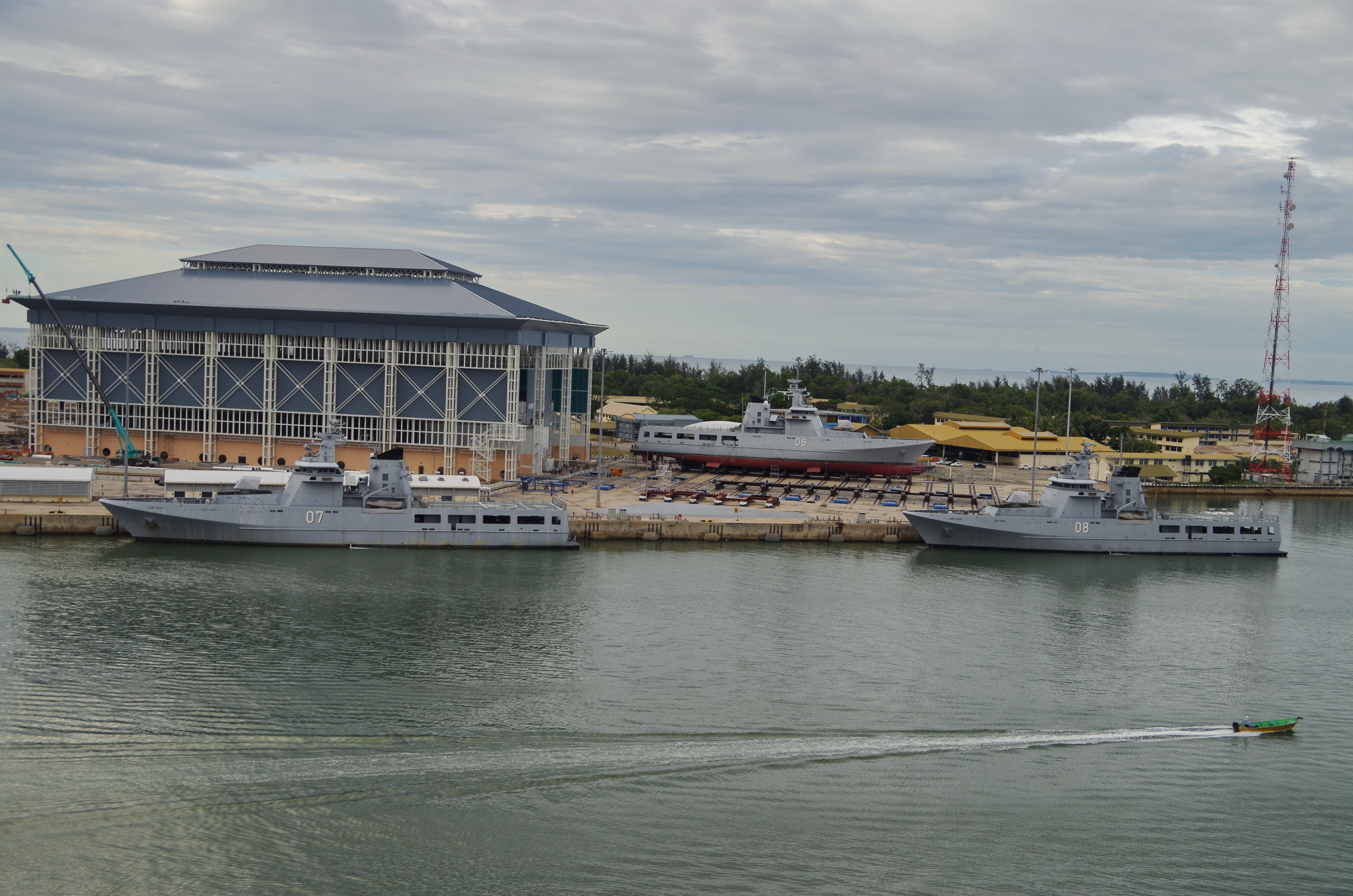
Muara Naval Base in 2013

Muara Naval Base serves as the headquarters and main operating base for the Royal Brunei Navy. Located about 4 kilometres from Muara town, the base became the site for the Royal Brunei Malay Regiment's boat section in 1974. Over the years, Muara Naval Base has undergone significant upgrades, including a $140 million project in 1997 that improved its quay and facilities to accommodate new offshore patrol vessels. Further development occurred with new accommodations and technical facilities in 2011. The base regularly hosts international events, including the Cooperation Afloat Readiness and Training (CARAT) exercises with the United States, and has welcomed high-profile visits, such as from Singapore's President Tony Tan in 2013.

=== Places of interest ===
Muara Beach, located along the coast of the South China Sea, is one of Brunei's most popular beaches, spanning 11 hectares (27 acres). As part of the 2007–2012 National Development Plan, the beach underwent significant renovations in 2006. The redevelopment featured a 7-meter-wide grand entrance leading to a new information centre, a 1.2-kilometer-long walkway and cycling track, and 26 shelters with barbecue pits. Other additions included a playground, a surau, restrooms, a reflexology path, a camping area, outdoor water taps and showers, as well as a beach football and volleyball field. Additionally, the Brunei–Australia Memorial is situated at the beach.

== Notable people ==
- Ahmad Jumat (born 1941), politician and minister
- Lim Jock Seng (born 1944), Chinese politician and minister

== Gallery ==
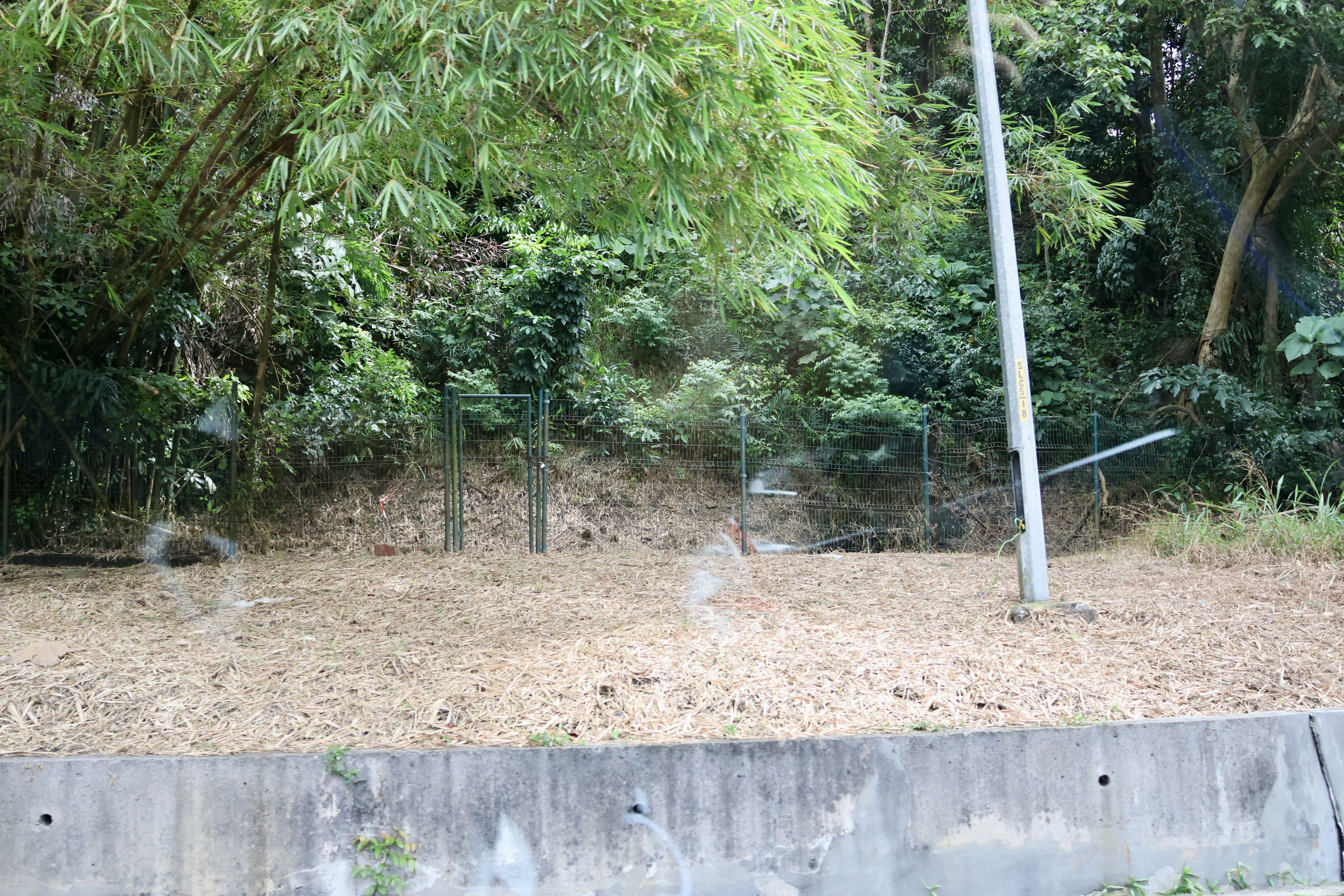
Brooketon colliery fenced-off

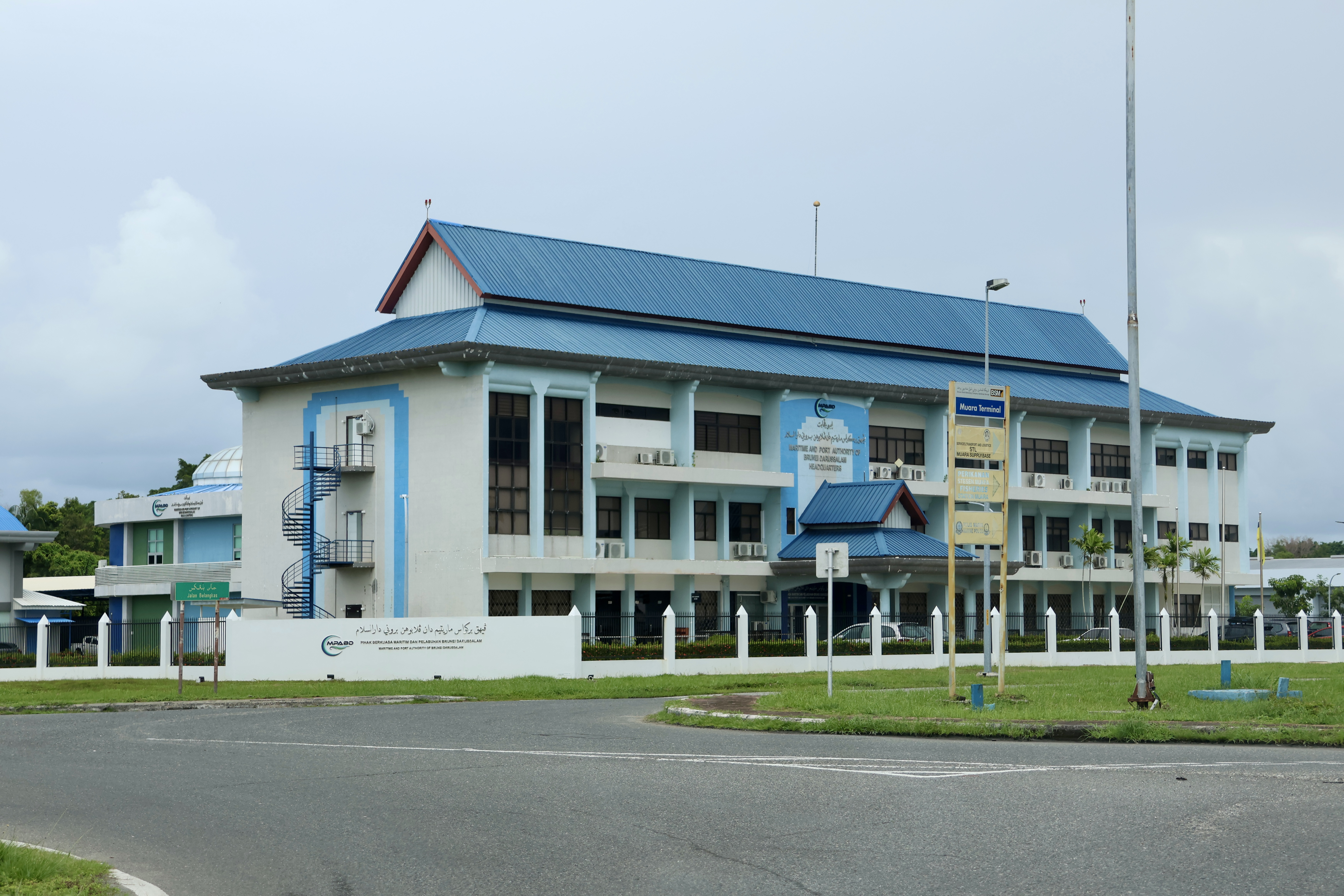
MPABD headquarters

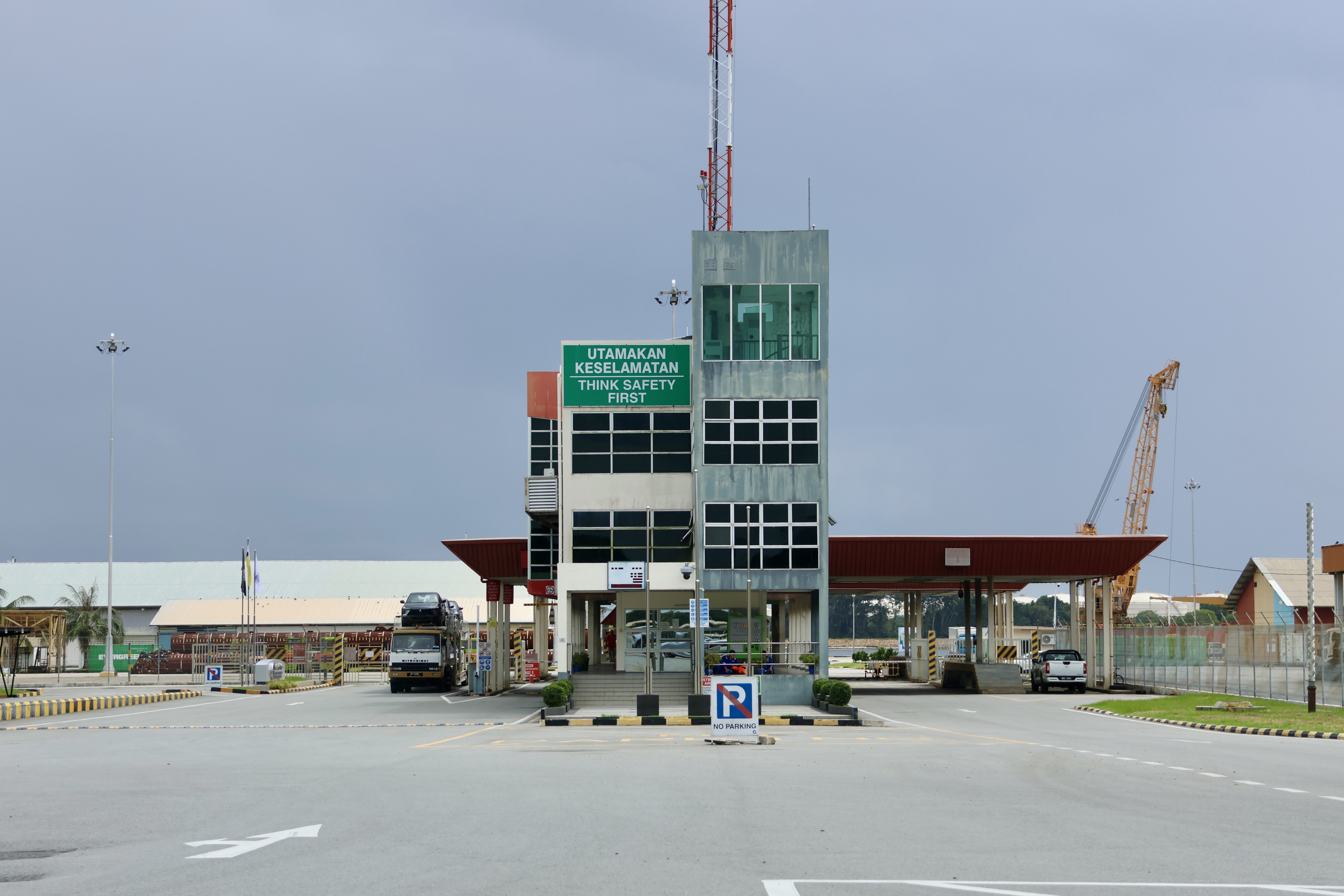
Muara Conventional Terminal

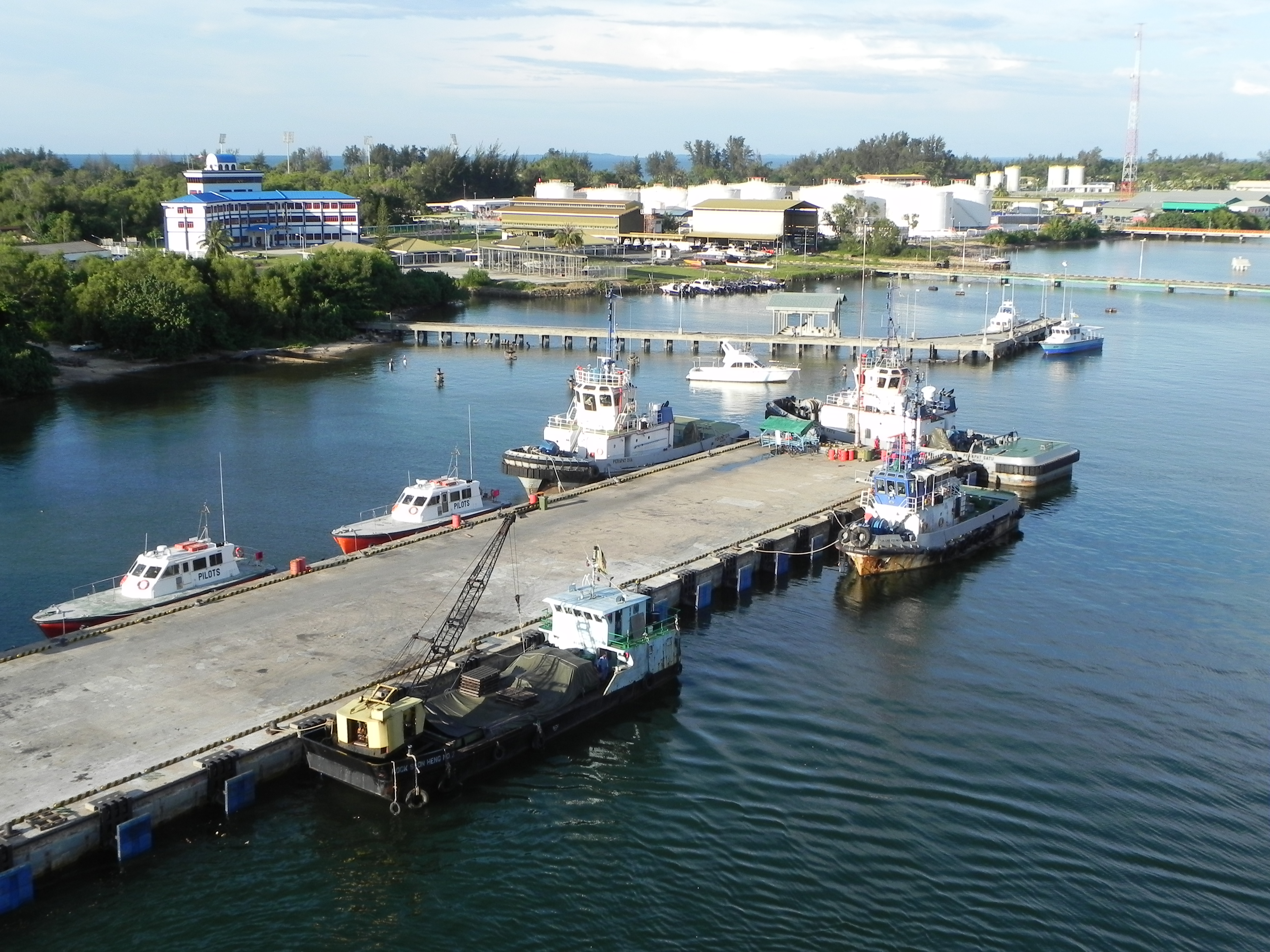
Muara fishing pier and the Marine Police Unit

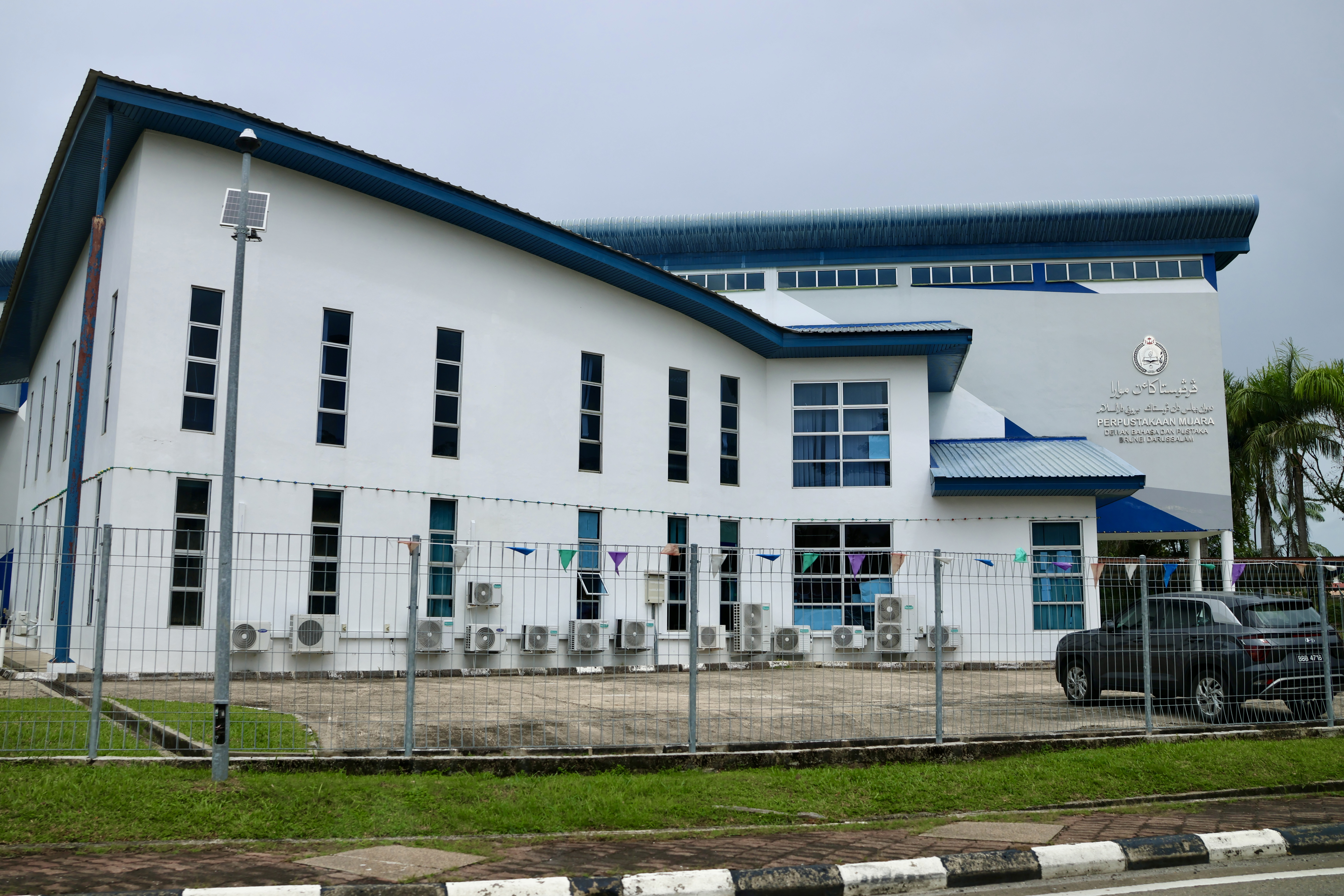
Muara Library

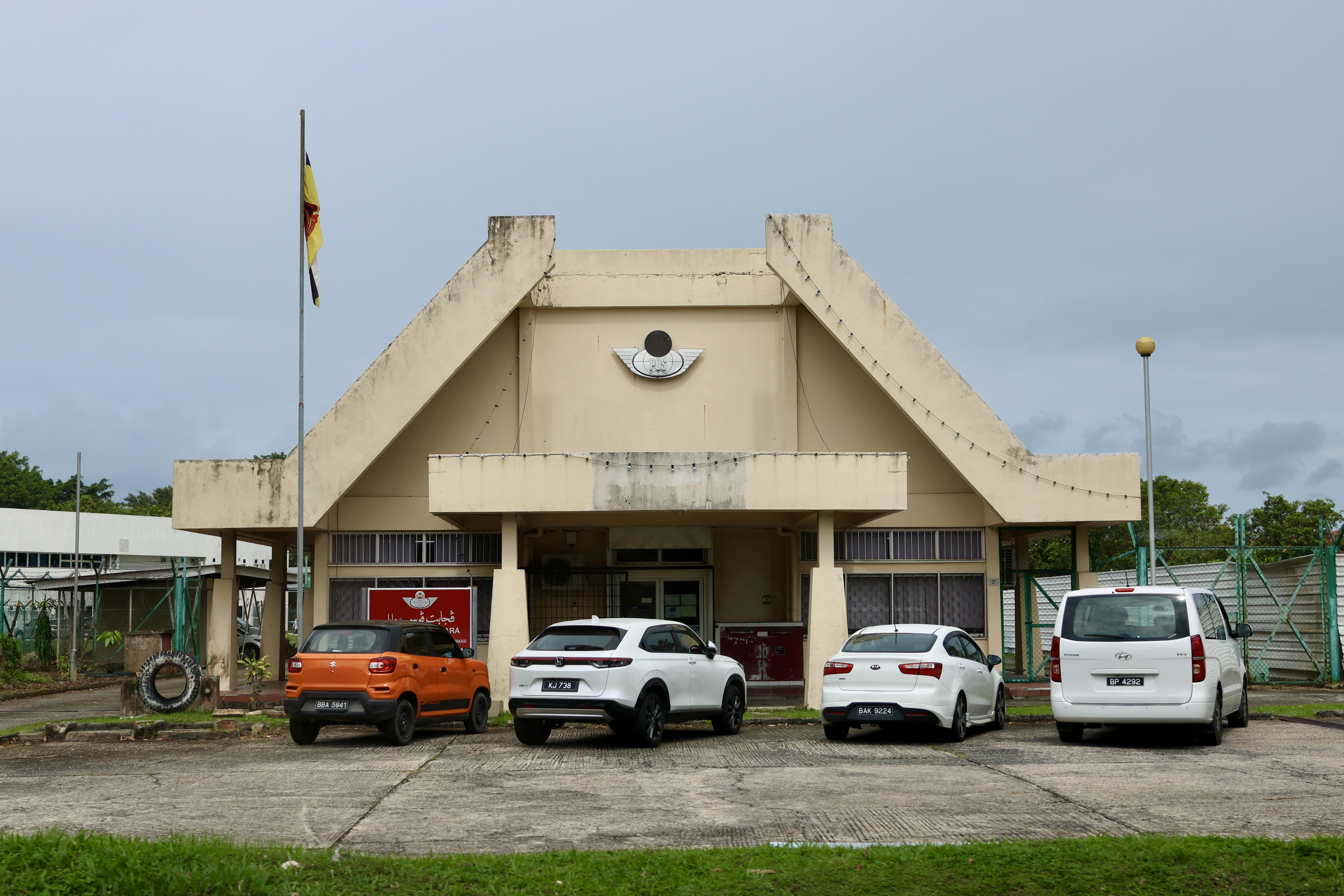
Muara Post Office

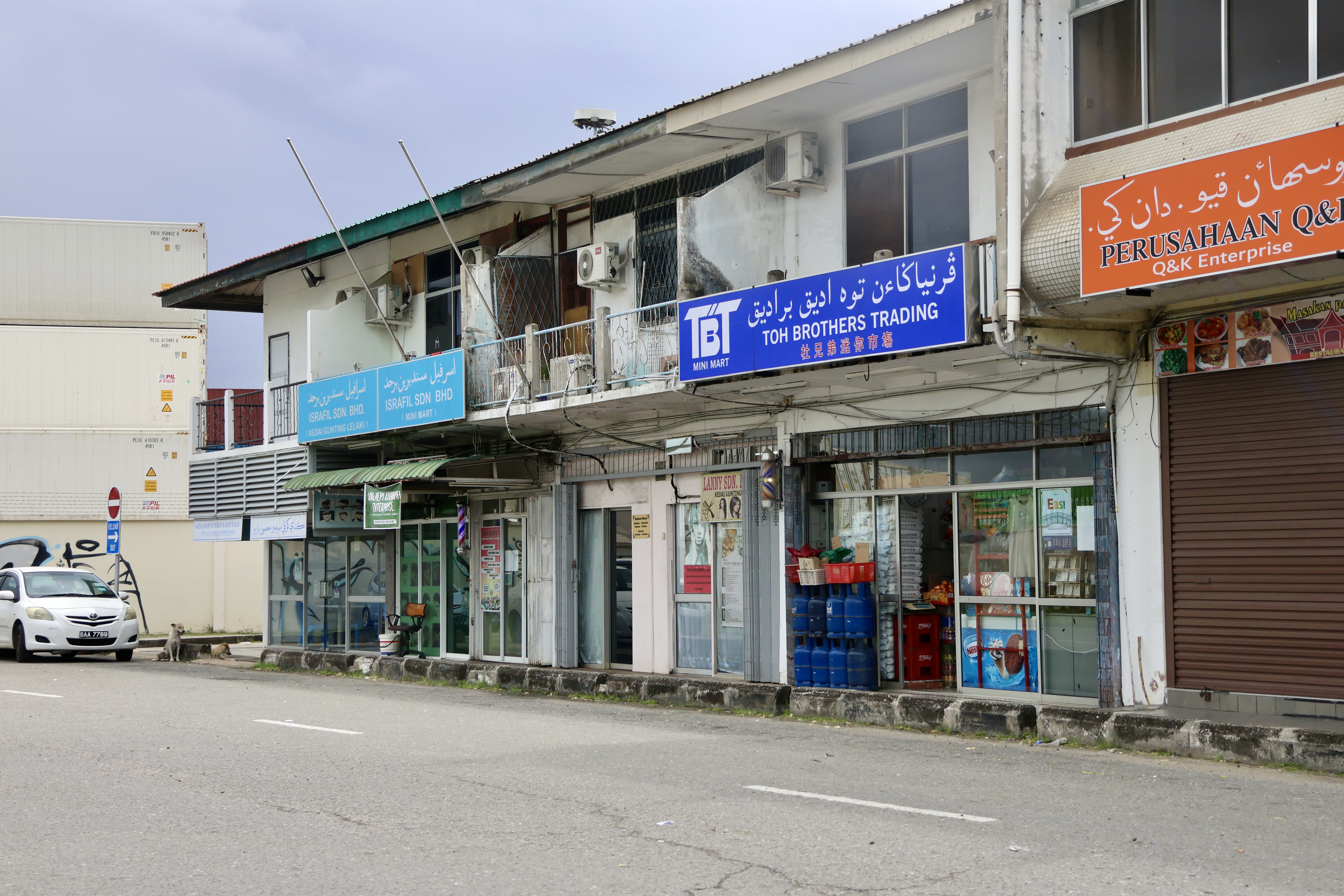
Muara town shophouses
