= Serasa Beach =

Beach in Brunei-Muara, Brunei

- Pantai Serasa
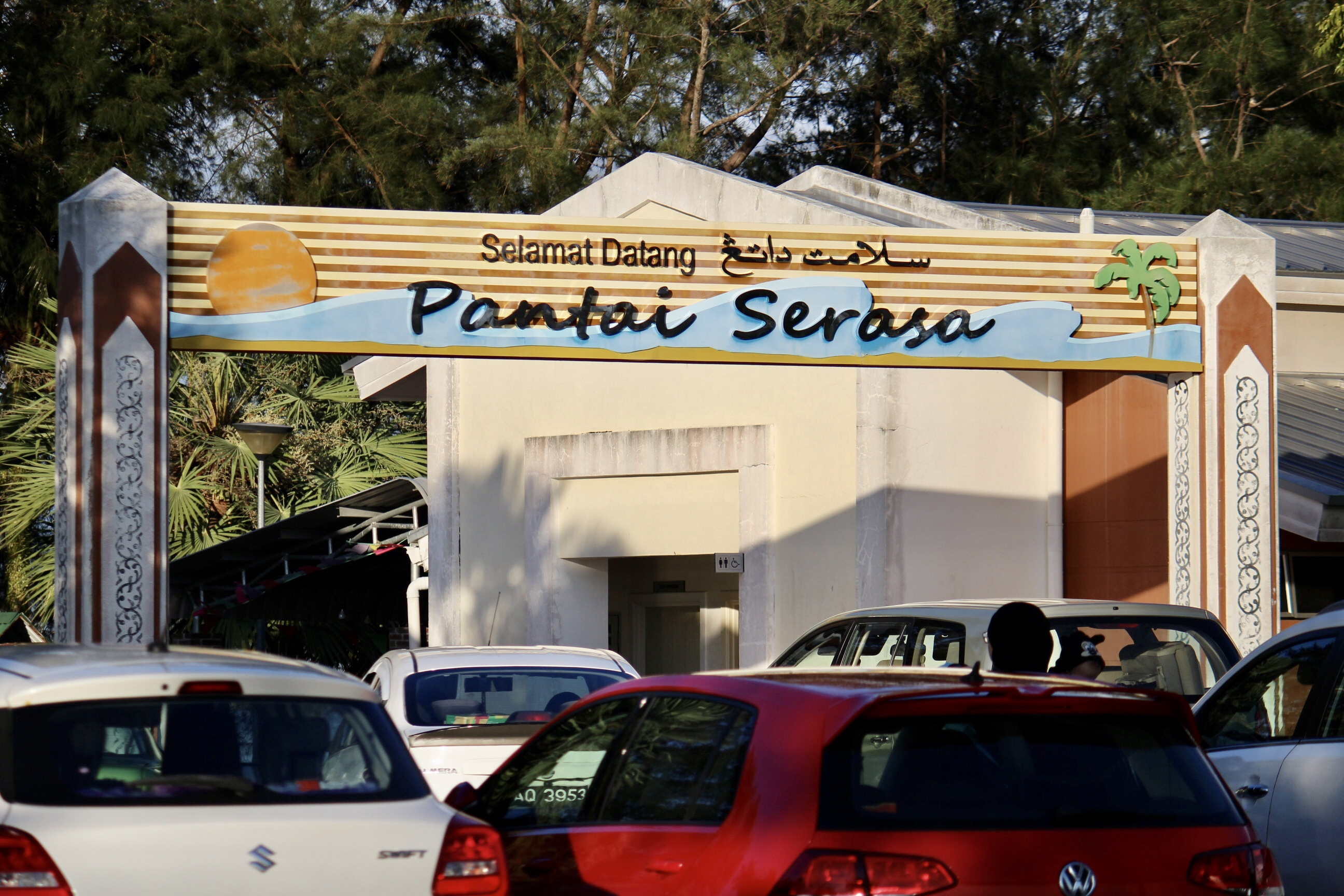

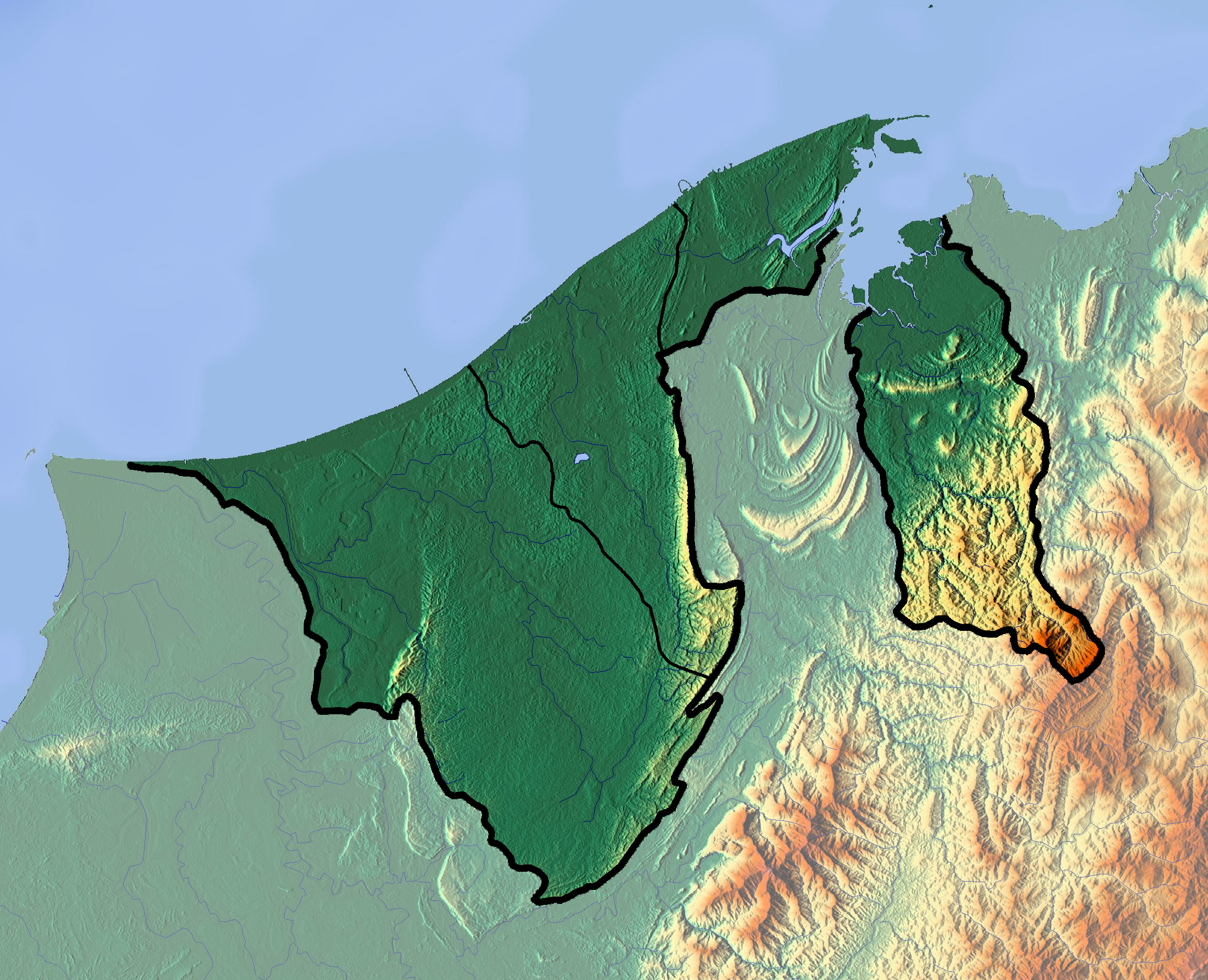
- Location within Brunei
- Location: Serasa, Brunei-Muara
- Nearest city: Bandar Seri Begawan, Brunei-Muara
- Coordinates: 4.9888122°N 115.0682313°E
- Established: 1980; 46 years ago
- Governing body: Bandar Seri Begawan Municipal Department

Serasa Beach (Malay: Pantai Serasa) is located to the south of Muara Town, accessible via Jalan Serasa, which leads to Simpang 287 and continues to the end of the road. The beach spans an area of 1 kilometre (0.62 miles). It is an artificial extension of Serasa Bay, in Mukim Serasa. Additionally, the beach is just a few minutes away from both Muara Port and the town itself.

== History ==
Originally, this beach was a fishing village. In 1970, the area was improved and developed through the cooperative efforts of the villagers and the public to provide facilities for fishermen from Bedukang Island and the tip of Tanjong Serasa. In 1980, the government renovated and opened the beach for public use. Later, in 1990, the government provided various facilities for the public, including the construction of a sports complex specifically for boat racing during the 1999 SEA Games.

On 18 March 2014, the Crown Prince Al-Muhtadee Billah reopened the beach after the completion of the beach's B$3.45 million renovation. A high tide in 2018 caused debris and rubbish to be washed up onto both the beach and nearby roads. From 20 until 22 September 2019, the beach hosted the Inaugural BDYA Sailing Championship 2019. In 2021, recycle bins were installed. A beach cleaning campaign was carried out by the Universiti Brunei Darussalam (UBD) on 7 February 2022.

== Features ==
The Royal Brunei Yacht Club, Royal Brunei Windsurfing Association and Serasa Water Sports Complex are present in the vicinity of the beach. It is noted that the beach is known for windsurfing, kayaking and jet skiing. Moreover, the beach is also a place for recreation and fishing.
