= Mukim Serasa =

Mukim in Brunei

- Mukim
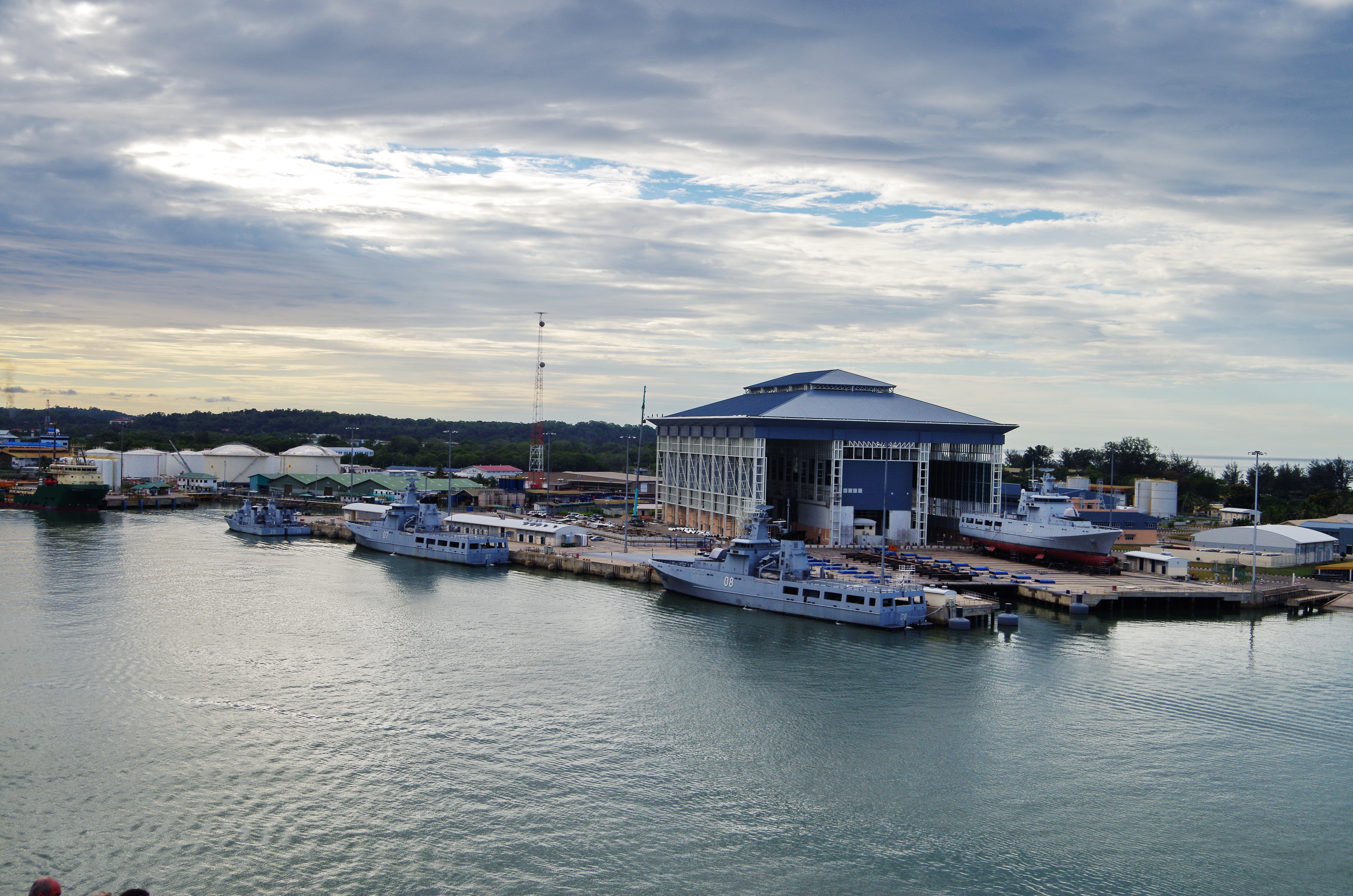
- Muara Naval Base

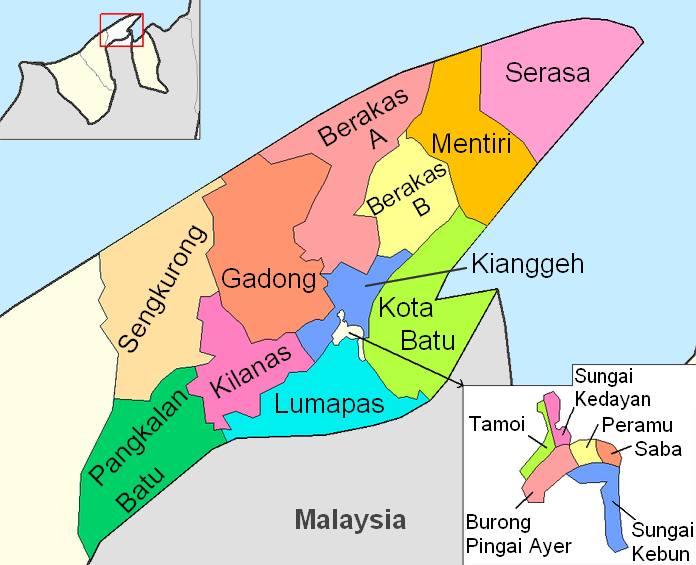
- Serasa is in pink.
- Coordinates: 5°00′29″N 115°03′09″E
- Country: Brunei
- District: Brunei-Muara

Government
  - Penghulu: Saiful Adli bin Ali Hassan

Population (2021)
  - Total: 18,569
- Time zone: UTC+8 (BNT)
- Postcode: BTxx28

Mukim Serasa is a mukim in Brunei-Muara District, Brunei. The population was 18,569 in 2021. The mukim encompasses Muara Town, home to Muara Port, the country's only deepwater port.

== Etymology ==
Serasa is thought to have been given its name by a group of migrant workers who arrived at one of the village's waterways. They took some of the pucuk gajus (cashew leaves) and pucuk pawas (sprouts) as side dishes when they stopped to rest and eat their prepared pais-paisan meals. They discovered the taste of the pucuk-pucuk to be serasa (fitted to their palates), after eating it. They settled there and gave the river the name Serasa. Meragang, means red monkey in Dusun.

== Geography ==
Mukim Serasa is the north-easternmost mukim in the district, its land border is only with Mukim Mentiri to the west; the rest are bounded by the South China Sea to the north and the Brunei Bay to the east and south.

There are several island bodies off the coast of Serasa and the two which are well-known include Pelong Rocks (Malay: Pulau Pilong-Pilongan) and Pulau Muara Besar. There are also two sand spits found on its coast: Pelumpong Island, which is originally a spit but has become a narrow island when an artificial channel was cut to provide access to Muara Port; and Serasa Spit, an artificial spit.

== Demographics ==
As of the 2016 census, the population of Mukim Serasa comprised 8,770 males and 7,403 females. The mukim had 2,946 households occupying 2,878 dwellings. The entire population lived in urban areas.

== Villages ==
As of 2021, the mukim encompasses the following villages:

Settlements	Population (2021)	Ketua kampung (2024)
Penghulu Mukim Serasa Saiful Adli bin Ali Hassan
kampong Kapok, Kampong Sabun	1,163	Shahminan bin Haji Abdul Rahman
Kampong Serasa	2,676	Abdul Hamid bin Haji Zinin @ Haji Zainin
RPN Kampong Serasa	2,676	Abdul Hamid bin Haji Zinin @ Haji Zainin
Muara Town	2,539	Shahminan bin Haji Abdul Rahman (Acting)
Kampong Masjid Lama	2,539	Shahminan bin Haji Abdul Rahman (Acting)
Kampong Pelumpong	2,539	Shahminan bin Haji Abdul Rahman (Acting)
RPN Kampong Meragang Area 1	9,190	Madzlan bin Haji Jumat
RPN Kampong Meragang Area 2	9,190	Mohamad bin Haji Tamin

== Infrastructure ==
=== Education ===
Pengiran Isteri Hajjah Mariam Secondary is the only secondary school within the mukim.

Meragang Sixth Form Centre, one of the few sixth form colleges in the country, is located in Kampong Meragang.

=== Housing ===
The RPN Kampong Meragang is a major residential project that would ultimately provide 1,933 housing units, primarily consisting of single detached bungalows, with some attached terrace houses included in phases H1 to H6. Additionally, a 41 hectares (100 acres) lot has been reserved for an extension to the scheme, potentially adding 2,500 more housing units as part of the 2012–2017 National Development Plan. This extension, if approved, would significantly impact population growth and the urban settlement structure of the district. A 0.8 hectares (2.0 acres) site within the scheme has also been designated for "apartments," though further details on the project are unavailable.

=== Mosques ===
- Kampong Kapok Mosque
- Kampong Perpindahan Serasa Mosque
- Setia Ali Mosque

== Places of interest ==
The coast of Serasa which borders the South China Sea is lined with the beaches of Meragang, Muara, and Tanjong Batu and they have been designated as places of recreation for the public.

The coast of the artificial Serasa Spit is also lined with beach features. The area of this Serasa Beach has also been made into a public recreational area.

Brooketon Colliery is a disused coal mine. It was developed during the period of Charles Brooke's rule of Sarawak in the late 19th and early 20th centuries.

Muara Naval Base is home to the base of the Royal Brunei Navy.
