= Pelumpong Island =

Artificial island in Brunei Bay

Native name: Pulau Pelumpong
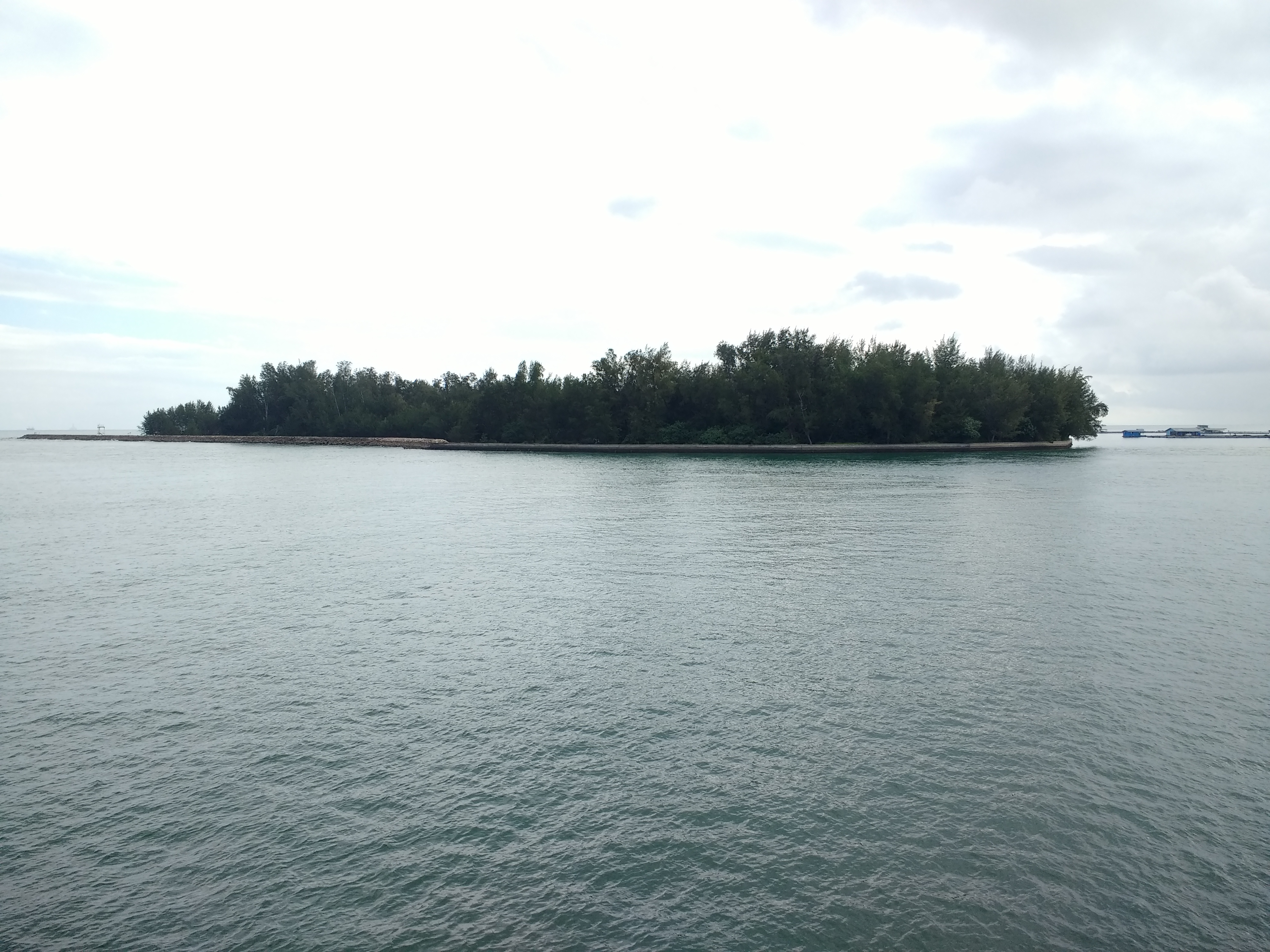
- The island in 2019

- Location in Brunei

Geography
- Location: Brunei Bay
- Coordinates: 5.04°N 115.11°E
- Archipelago: Malay Archipelago
- Area: 64 ha (160 acres)

Administration
- Brunei
- District: Brunei–Muara
- Mukim: Serasa

Demographics
- Population: 0

Pelumpong Island (Malay: Pulau Pelumpong), formerly known as the Tanjong Pelumpong sand spit, is an artificial island located in Brunei Bay within the Brunei–Muara District, southwest of Bandar Seri Begawan. Situated near the southern entrance to Brunei Bay, the island is characterised by its dramatic sandy formation. Pelumpong Island supports a thriving coral ecosystem, home to 34 identified scleractinian coral taxa, contributing to its ecological significance in the region.

== Geography ==
Pelumpong Island, encompassing 64 hectares (160 acres), is a dynamic sandy formation situated at the southern entrance of Brunei Bay, near the northwest gateway to the Brunei River. The island's eastern expansion progresses at a rate of 30 metres (98 ft) annually. Its prominent point is characterised by driftwood deposits and becomes nearly submerged during high tides, with a navigational beacon that may be obscured by dense tree cover. A verdant grove of trees, reaching heights of 18 to 37 metres, extends approximately 1.75 kilometres (1.09 mi) westward, while shorter trees dominate the coastline further to the west. The sandy Muara Spit extends 5.23 kilometres 3.25 miles (5.23 km) northeast, partially submerged for the initial 2 kilometres (1.25 miles), before transitioning to depths of 4.3 metres at its outer edge, marked by distinctive tide-rips.

Situated on the western side of Brunei Bay, Pelumpong Island lies within a tropical estuarine environment. Its borders are flanked by mudflats and mangroves along the adjacent mainland shores. The island is framed by two submerged channels—the Western and Eastern Channels—that converge near its tip before flowing into the South China Sea.

== Ecology ==
Pelumpong Island supports a thriving coral ecosystem, with 34 identified taxa of scleractinian corals. The southeast-facing side of the channel groyne supports a diverse coral community, with colonies extending to depths of 4 metres. Nearby reefs, including Pelong Rocks, Abana Reef, Barat Banks, and Kuraman reefs, serve as potential sources of coral larvae. Coral cover at the site is notably robust at 59.8%, despite sedimentation rates averaging over 70 mg/cm²/day. Some colonies are large and well-established, reflecting significant growth over the past 37–40 years, with fluorescent bands in Porites lutea cores providing additional evidence of the site's ecological history.

The coral community remains healthy even under high sedimentation pressures, thanks to moderate wave exposure that facilitates sediment removal and supports the corals' active rejection mechanisms. Species such as Pectinia paeonia and Turbinaria mesenterina exhibit greater sediment tolerance compared to more sensitive taxa like Acropora. The area's stable salinity levels, consistently exceeding 30.3 ppt even during the wet northeast monsoon season, further contribute to coral resilience.

In addition to its coral habitats, Pelumpong Island's marine environment includes seagrass meadows, which serve as critical feeding grounds for the endangered dugong. This highlights the island's ecological importance within the broader marine ecosystem.

== History ==
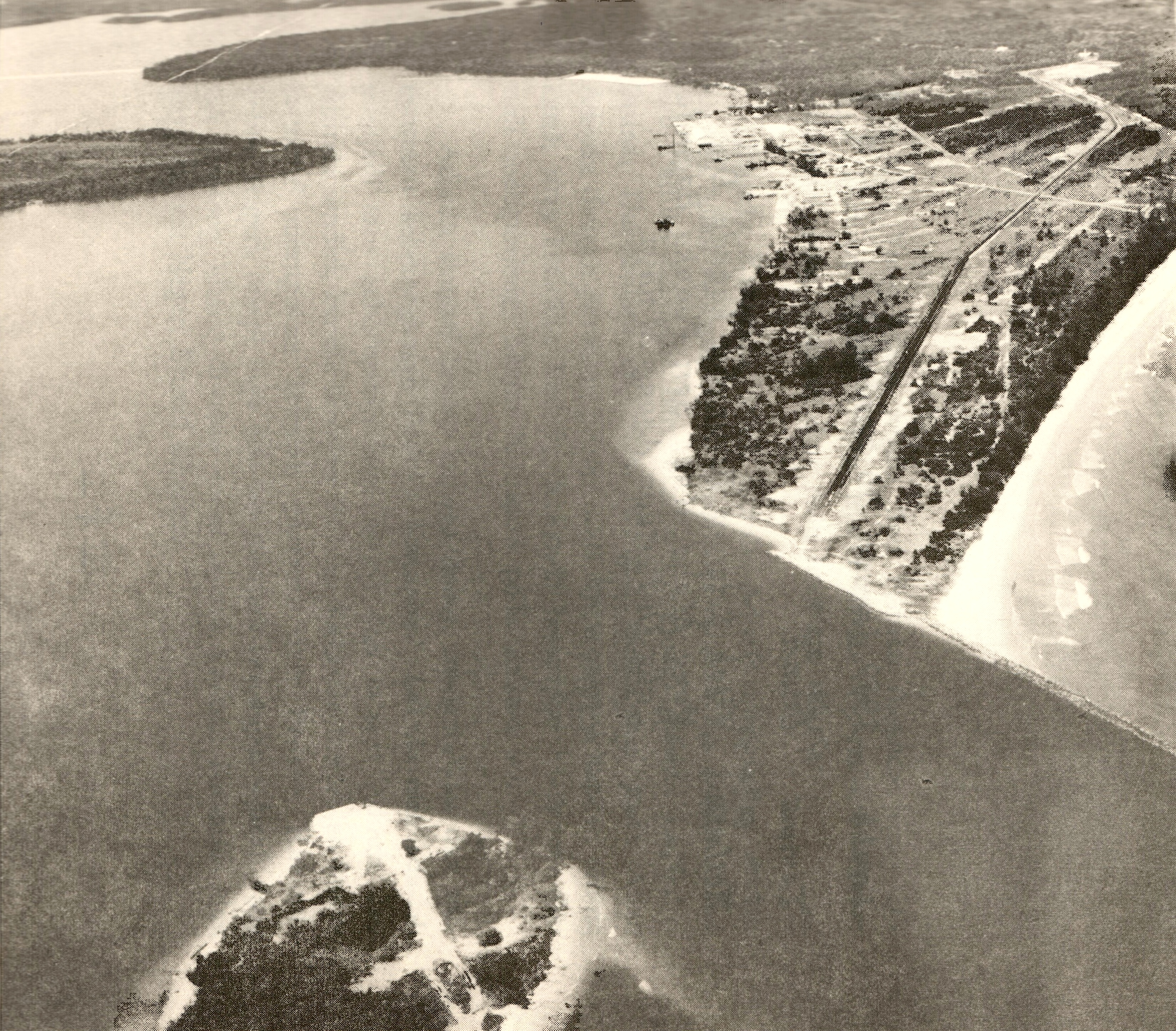
Pelumpong Island (foreground) and the newly dredged channel in c. 1971

Historical records from 1966 indicate the presence of nautical beacons near the spit. Initially a sand spit connected to the mainland, Pelumpong Island was transformed into an isolated landform during the 1970s with the construction of Muara Port. This project involved the dredging of a channel, which was stabilised using concrete and boulder armouring, including groynes designed to prevent silting.

In subsequent efforts to develop Pulau Muara Besar (PMB) into a "supercontainer" port, the channel between the spit and PMB was originally dredged to a depth of 9 metres during Muara Port's construction and later deepened to 12.5 metres in 2000. To facilitate navigation, an access canal was also excavated along the spit. Portions of the spit near the channel have been designated for port operations, marine police activities, and naval use.

== Economy ==
Pelumpong Island's aquaculture sector, especially its 122-hectare offshore fish cage culture farm, has a major positive impact on the local economy. Seabass, pompano, red snapper, and grouper are among the fish species produced at this farm; in 2018, 315 metric tons were produced annually; in 2019, that amount is expected to rise to 546 metric tonnes. Grouper is a significant export product, accounting for around 60% of Brunei's total fisheries production. Pelumpong Island's economic significance in Brunei's fisheries industry is increased by expansion plans, such as oyster breeding, which show continued growth and diversification initiatives.

== See also ==
- List of islands of Brunei
