= Muara Port =

Commercial port in Muara, Brunei-Muara District, Brunei

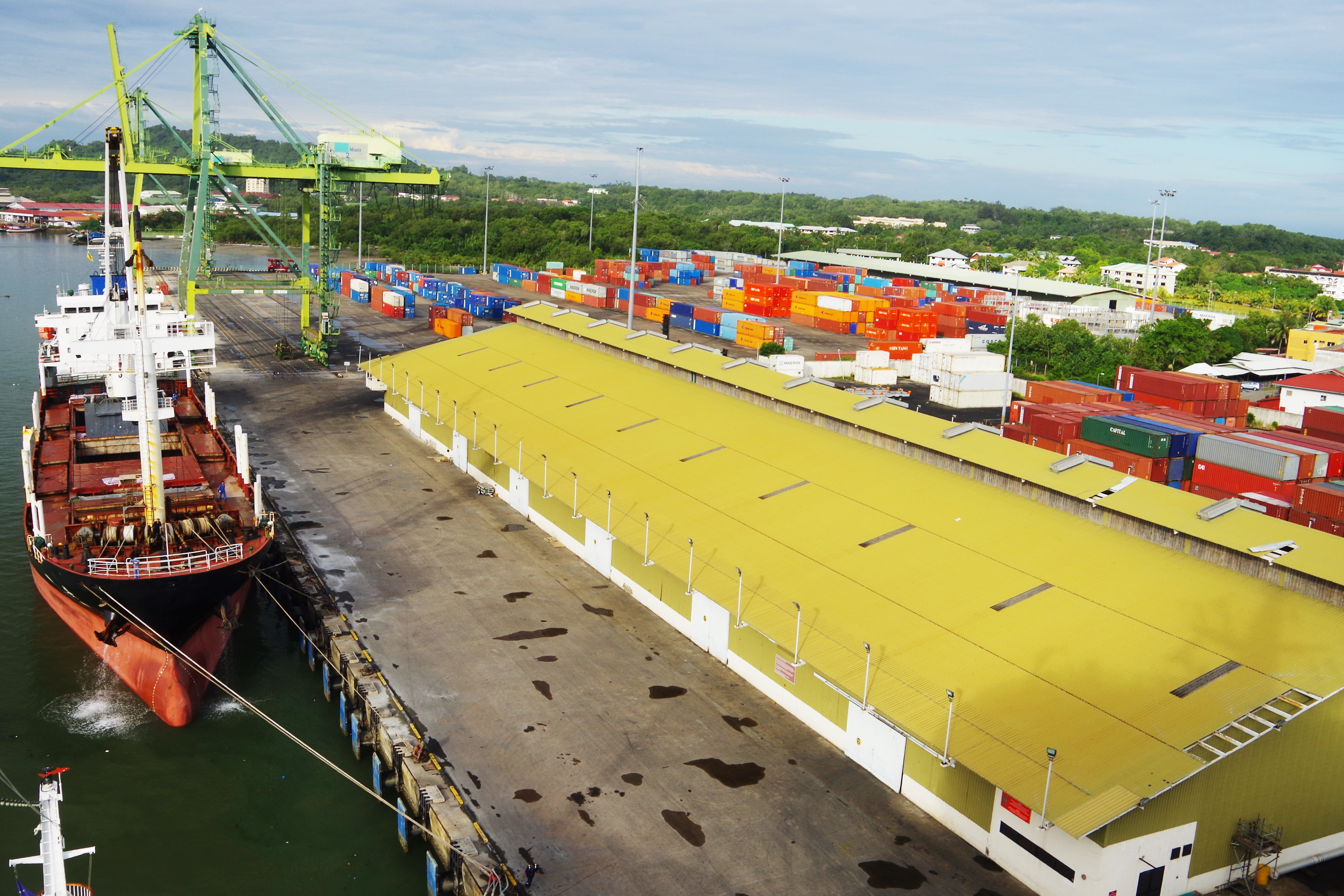
- Muara Port in 2013
- Interactive map of Muara Port
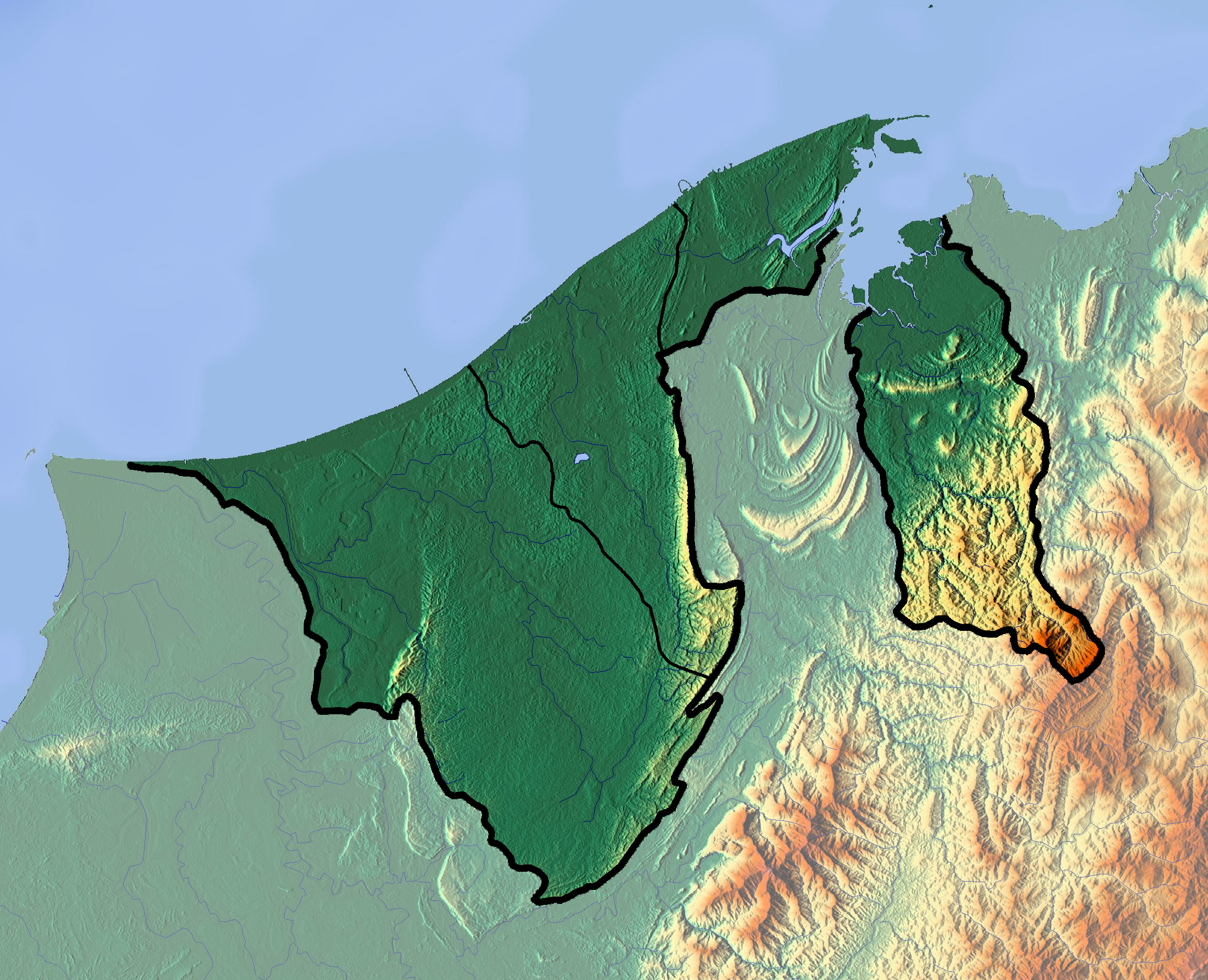
- Location in Brunei

Location
- Country: Brunei
- Location: Muara, Brunei-Muara
- Coordinates: 5°01′27″N 115°04′14″E

Details
- Opened: 1973
- Operated by: Muara Port Company
- Size: 24 ha (59 acres)

Statistics
- Annual container volume: 330,000 twenty-foot equivalent units (TEU)
- Website www.muaraportcompany.com.bn

The Muara Port (Malay: Pelabuhan Muara), also known as Muara Harbour, is a seaport operated by the Muara Port Company (MPC) Sdn Bhd, under the supervision of the Maritime and Port Authority of Brunei Darussalam. The port also contributed to the Brunei Darussalam–Indonesia–Malaysia–Philippines East ASEAN Growth Area (BIMP-EAGA).

== Geography ==
The port's location allows access to the Oceania, Indian Ocean, Pacific Ocean and Atlantic Ocean. The port lies 28 km from the capital of Brunei, Bandar Seri Begawan and it was considered to be the Gateway for Trade. The Muara Naval Base lies north-east of the port, and Muara Besar Island in the west. The port also contains a free trade zone, which is known as the Muara Export Zone (MEZ).

== History ==
In 1973, the port was officially completed and it became the largest port in Brunei. In 1982, the port underwent a B$26.5 million expansion project. It can also be noted after 1997, the port might not have been in use due to the decline in cargo volume. The Port Authority bought two quay cranes in 1996.

In 2000, a joint venture was made with the Port of Singapore Authority (PSA), and later on 23 June 2003 United States Navy warships USS Vincennes (CG-49) and USS Harpers Ferry (LSD-49) were berthed at the port during Cooperation Afloat Readiness and Training (CARAT). Once again during CARAT 2005, USS Safeguard (T-ARS-50), USS Rodney M. Davis (FFG-60) and USS Paul Hamilton (DDG-60) were present at Muara Port.

In 2011, there has been regional competition between Bintulu Port and Muara Port. In 2013, three inland container depots have been upgraded, and in 2014, the Belt and Road Initiative's Brunei-Guangxi Economic Corridor (BGEC) was signed between Brunei and China. The Muara Port Company is a joint ventured company between Darussalam Assets Sdn Bhd and Beibu Gulf Holding formed on 15 February 2017, and later on 18 July 2018 the Muara Container Terminal was acquired by the company. On 26 March 2019, Royal Navy frigate HMS Montrose (F236) arrived at the port to conduct exercises, and later from 27 until 30 September, the People's Liberation Army Navy training ship Qi Jiguang was berthed at the port during a goodwill visit.

The MPC signed an agreement with the Brunei government to build and acquire the largest fishing complex in Brunei on 22 December 2020, thus enhancing the Brunei–China relations. On 5 June 2021, the pre-commencement ceremony of the Muara Port Expansion Project was attended by the Chinese Ambassador Yu Hong, Minister of Finance and Economy and Minister of Transport and InfoCommunications. On 30 January 2021, the French Navy frigate Vendémiaire (F 734) made a three-day visit to Brunei, and later on 27 July, HMS Defender (D36) became the first Royal Navy ship to visit Brunei since 2019.

Plans were made to expand the port by 2023, in which it will increase the quay length and capacity from 280,000 TEUs to 500,000.

== Facilities ==
There are several designated areas and facilities within the port:

- A 72,500 m^{2} (780,000 sq ft) container yard
- 7,050 m^{2} (75,900 sq ft) of transit warehouses
- A 861 m (2,825 ft) long mooring quay
- A 5,000 m^{2} (54,000 sq ft) container freight station
- 32,011 m^{2} (344,560 sq ft) of warehouses
- 18,427 m^{2} (198,350 sq ft) of Muara inland container depot
- 22,280 m^{2} (239,800 sq ft) of Muara export zone
