= Brunei–Muara District =

District of Brunei

Coordinates: 4.9°N 114.9°E

Brunei–Muara District Daerah Brunei–Muara (Malay) دايره بروني موارا (Jawi)
- District
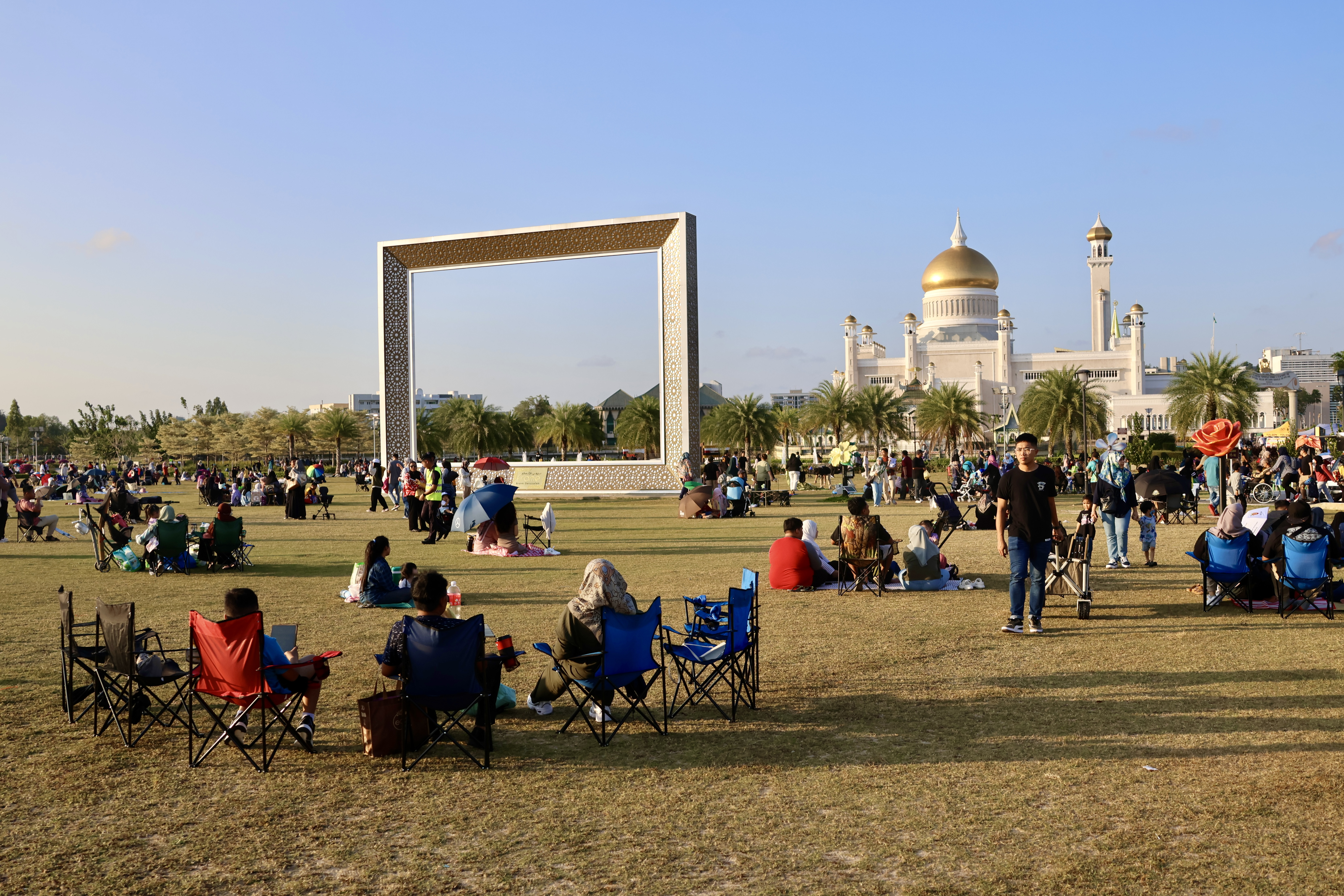
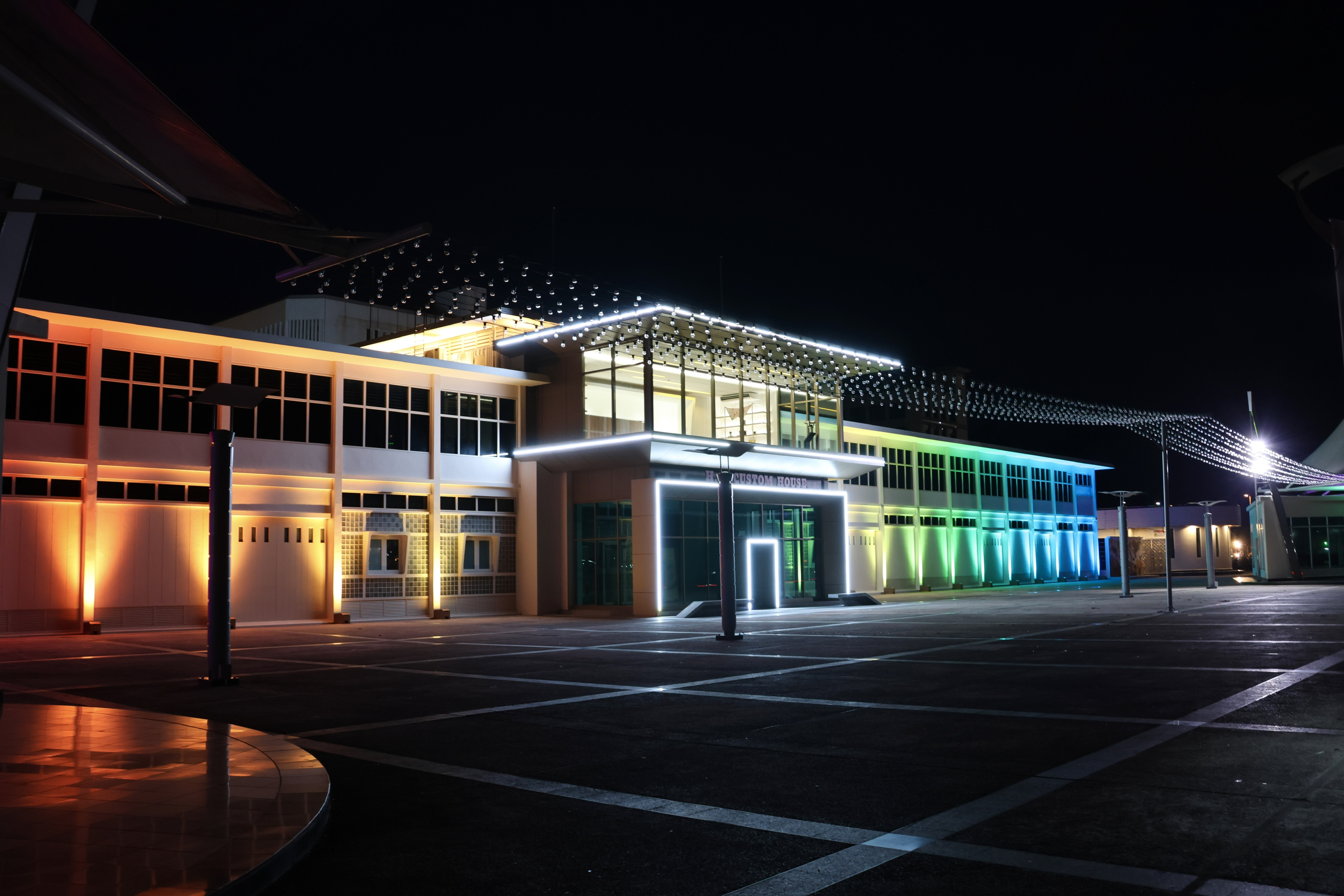
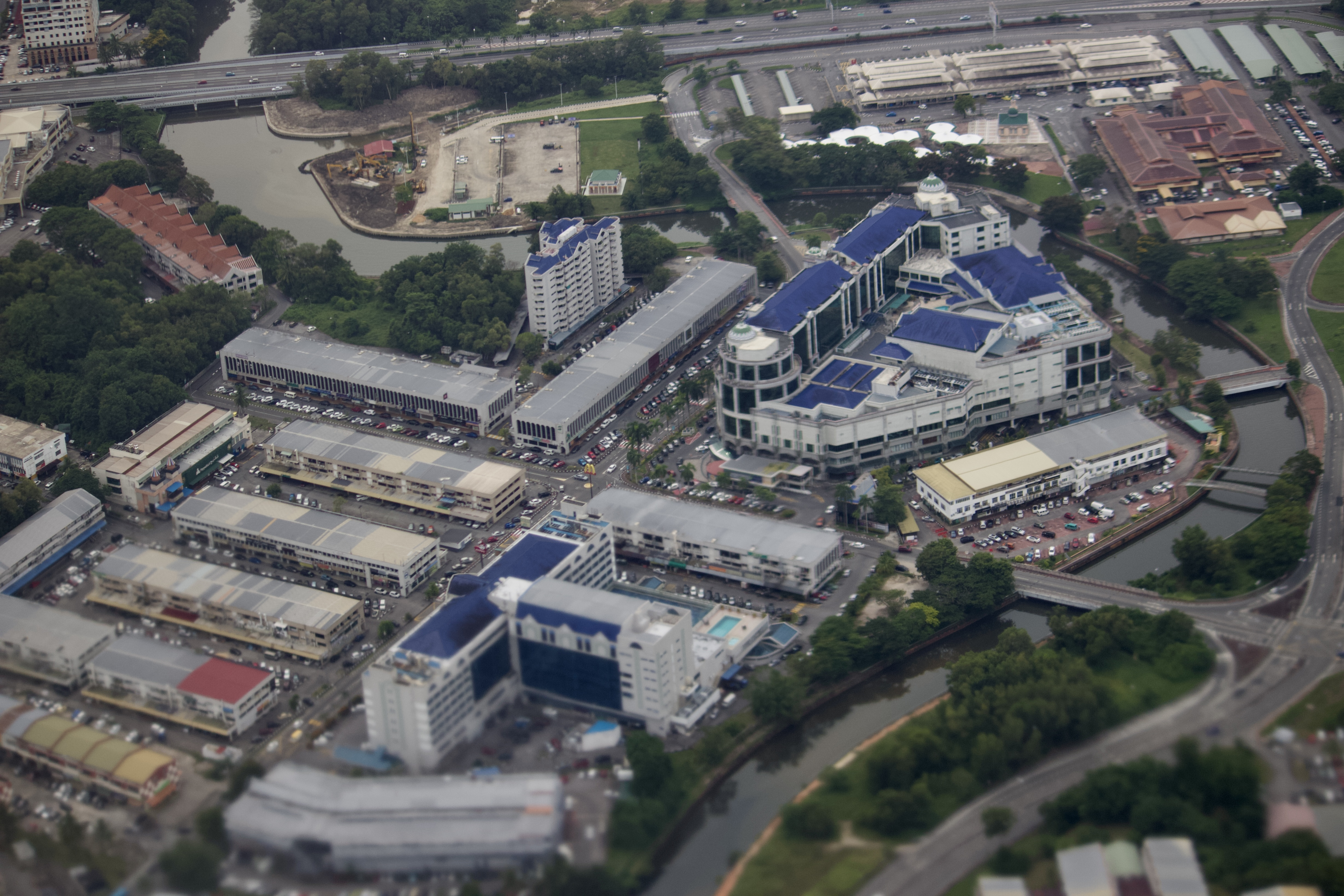
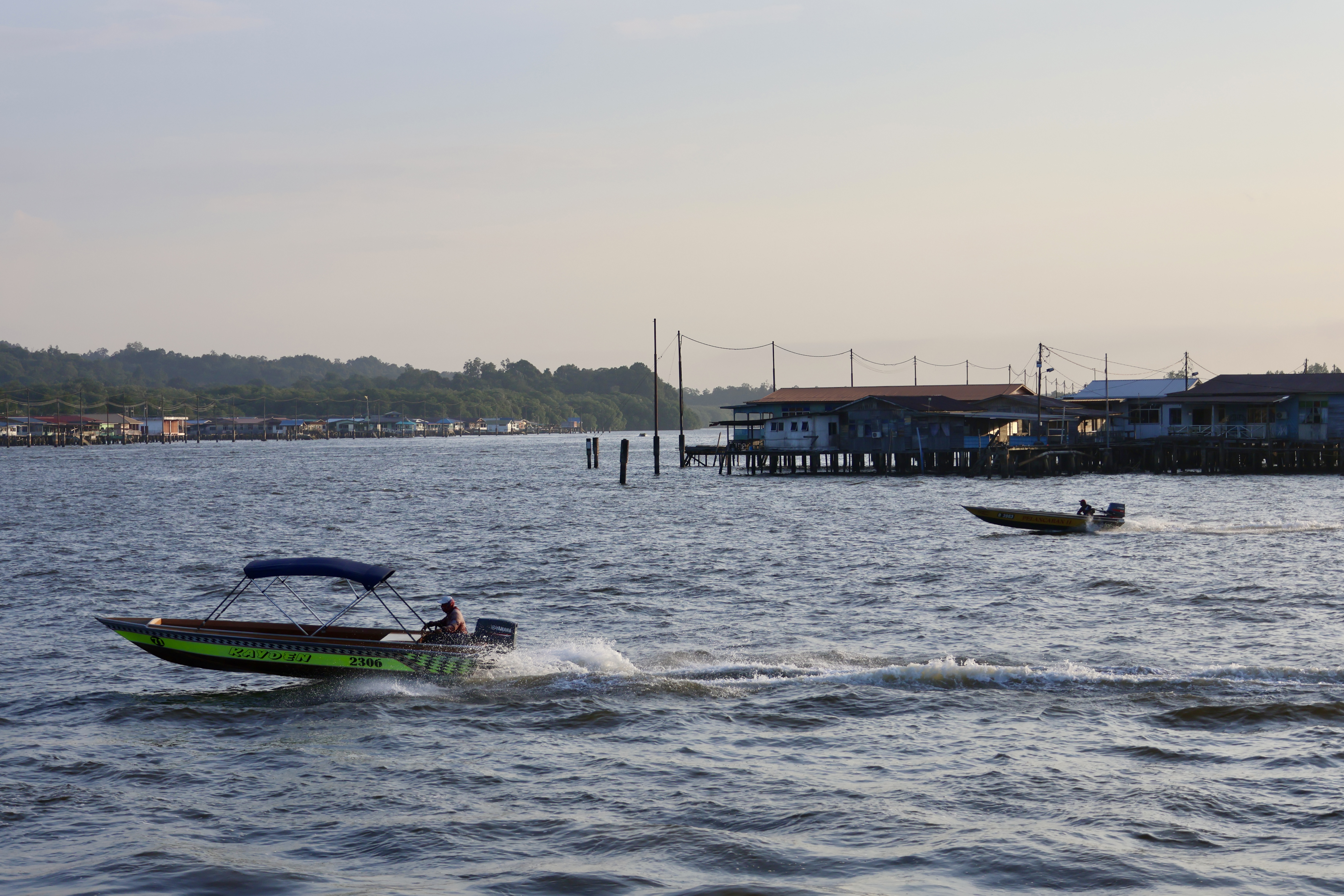
- Clockwise from top left: Taman Mahkota Jubli Emas, Brunei Energy Hub, Kampong Ayer, Gadong commercial area

- Country: Brunei
- Merger with Limau Manis District: 1908
- Merger with Muara District: 1938
- Administrative centre: Bandar Seri Begawan
- Mukims: 18 (see Mukims)

Government
  - Type: Municipality
  - Body: Brunei–Muara District Office
  - DO: Pengiran Muhammad Ameer Mubarak (Acting)

Area
  - Total: 571 km^{2} (220 sq mi)
  - Rank: 4th in Brunei
- Highest elevation: 234 m (767 ft)

Population (2021)
  - Total: 318,530
  - Rank: 1st in Brunei
  - Density: 558/km^{2} (1,440/sq mi)
- Time zone: UTC+8 (BNT)
- Postcode: B
- Area code: 2
- Website: www.bruneimuara.gov.bn

Brunei–Muara District (Malay: Daerah Brunei–Muara; Jawi: دايره بروني موارا), or simply known as Brunei–Muara (BROO-nai moo-WAH-rah), is the smallest as well as the most populated district in Brunei. It has an area of 571 square kilometres (220 sq mi) and the population of 318,530 as of 2021. The district is also home to the country's administrative centre, Bandar Seri Begawan, as well as the Brunei International Airport and Muara Port, the country's only international airport and deep-water port respectively. The Brunei River flows within this district and is home to Kampong Ayer. As the administrative center of Brunei is located in the district, it remains the most developed in the country with the most up-to-date infrastructure, despite not being the center of Brunei's main economic activity.

== Geography ==
Brunei–Muara District is bordered to the west by the Tutong District, to the south by Sarawak, Malaysia, and to the east by Brunei Bay, with Temburong District to the southeast and Sabah, Malaysia, to the east. The district's northern boundary is the South China Sea. The Brunei River flows through the district, emptying into Brunei Bay. The area is characterised by a coastal plain interspersed with low hills, with the capital city, Bandar Seri Begawan, situated on the northern bank of the river's estuary. Bukit Buang Sakar, the district's highest point, stands at 767 feet (234 m). The Muara Port, is located at the tip of a peninsula extending northeast to the Pelumpong Island.

A prominent feature of Brunei–Muara is the Pelumpong Island, which extends 7.5 kilometres (4.7 mi) eastward from Tanjung Batu on the mainland and then east-northeast to Pelumpong Island. A waterway was created halfway along the spit to improve access to Muara Port, with breakwaters extending seawards for protection. Brunei's land includes a narrow coastal strip between Kuala Belait and Lumut, where rivers and streams flow directly into the sea, and a larger area in Brunei–Muara, where streams drain into the Brunei River and eventually reach Brunei Bay. Eastward in the bay is the island of Pulau Muara Besar. North of the bay is Serasa Bay, encircled by the 1.6 kilometre long Serasa Spit, an artificial sandbar made from dredged sands, including those from the Pelumpong Island. The bay is fed by two rivers, Sungai Mangsalut and Sungai Mengkabau, and is surrounded by Brunei's mangrove forests, which cover 18,418 hectares, representing 3.2% of the country's total land area. Brunei Bay features extensive coastal swamplands totalling 44,290 hectares, including 31,160 hectares of mangroves and 13,128 hectares of nipah, with a coastline that stretches 194.73 kilometres.

Situated in Brunei–Muara, the Sengkurong region spans 100 hectares of level terrain encircled by steep hills, with a coastline front of approximately 1 kilometre and an inland extension of 2 kilometres. This area's alluvial soil is ideal for all kinds of agriculture since it is poorly drained and was mostly created as river levees without any acid sulfate threat. The Jerudong Cattle Fattening Station and the Luahan Cattle Breeding Station are currently the most utilised cattle farm. Generally having firm upper soils that soften in deeper layers, the flat alluvial floodplains of the district can be economically developed into recreational fields, roads, parking lots, and single-story buildings; the alluvio-marine mangrove and nipah swamps that dominate Brunei Bay's coastal areas can also be used for these purposes.

== History ==
The administrative center of the Bruneian Empire was originally located near Kampong Ayer in the Brunei–Muara District. Notably in 1837, this district was the centre of the coal industry, which was first mined in Brooketon Colliery. Over time, Brunei's territory significantly diminished, particularly with the cession of Sarawak to Sir James Brooke in 1841 and other concessions to the British North Borneo Company. In 1906, the introduction of the British Residency brought changes to the administrative structure, with European officials advising the Sultan and overseeing key departments. The government was centralised in Brunei Town, with Malay District Officers (DO) reporting to the British Resident in all four districts. In 1908, the administrative districts of Brunei and Limau Manis were merged.

Brunei–Muara, being the administrative centre, was a focal point for the British Resident's development efforts, particularly until 1932 when the rise of the oil industry began to shift attention to other districts. Nevertheless, the district remained the primary center for government operations and continued to receive significant focus. The present day Brunei–Muara District was formed in 1938 with the merger of the then Brunei and Limau Manis, and Muara administrative districts. By 1947, Brunei's territory had been reduced to around 2,226 square miles with an estimated population of 40,670. The key remaining districts were Belait, Tutong, Temburong and Brunei–Muara.

== Administration ==
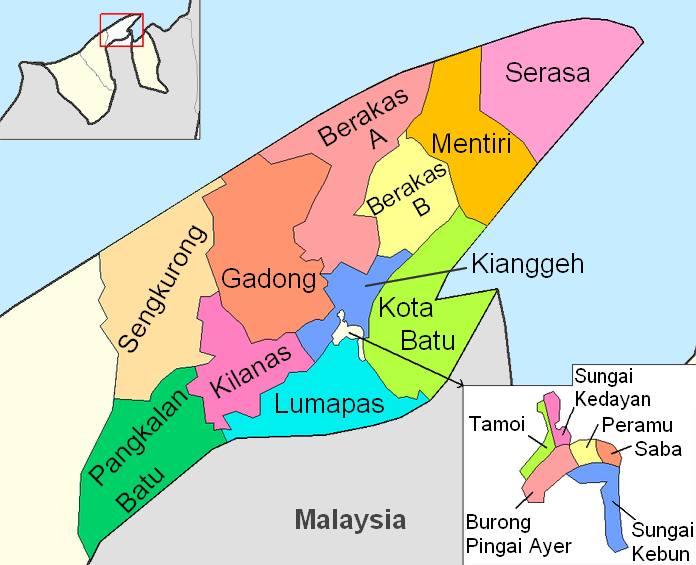
Mukims of Brunei–Muara

The borders of the Bandar Seri Begawan Municipal Board territory are defined by the Bandar Seri Begawan Municipal Board (borders of Municipal Board territory) Declaration, 2008, which came into effect on 1 August 2007, and are listed in the schedule. In addition, it states that areas that were previously subject to development control will no longer be so as of the declaration's effective date, and that any applications and enforcement actions that are still ongoing under earlier acts would proceed as though the declaration had never been issued. Additionally, the previous Brunei Town (Municipal Board Area) Notification, 1956 is repealed, and the Minister of Development is empowered to handle any problems that may arise from putting these changes into effect.

The procedures for the board's business conduct are outlined in the Bandar Seri Begawan Municipal Board (Standing Orders) By-Laws, 2018. Meeting procedures, such as notification requirements, quorum requirements, and the responsibilities of the chairman and secretary, are outlined in the bylaws. Members must adhere to certain voting and speaking procedures, and meetings must begin with a prayer. The chairman is in charge of the meeting, and every motion needs to be submitted in writing and seconded before it can be discussed. These bylaws guarantee the Municipal Board's organised and orderly governance.

The district is administered by the Brunei–Muara District Office (Jabatan Daerah Brunei dan Muara), a government department under the Ministry of Home Affairs. The district is subdivided into 18 mukims, namely:

Mukim	Population (2021)	Penghulu (2024)
Berakas 'A'	28,311	Omar bin Haji Dollah
Berakas 'B'	39,284	Haji Omar bin Haji Safar
Burong Pingai Ayer	1,459	Raimi bin Rashid
Gadong 'A'	35,424	Haji Julkepli bin Haji Ibrahim
Gadong 'B'	38,067	Pengiran Muhammad Nurramzu Nazri bin Pengiran Haji Mohd Salleh
Kianggeh	8,102	Lawi bin Haji Lamat
Kilanas	24,981	Ahmad Hussaini bin Haji Mohsin
Kota Batu	12,676	Haji Zaini bin Haji Salleh
Lumapas	8,058	Amran bin Haji Maidin
Mentiri	39,324	A. Hamidun bin Mohd Daud
Pangkalan Batu	15,860	Haji Tamam @ Haji Ahmad Shah Tamami bin Haji Timbang
Sengkurong	40,972	Dr Haji Abdullah Hanif bin Orang Kaya Maharaja Dinda Haji Saman
Serasa	18,569	overseen by Brunei–Muara District Office
Peramu	1,151	Raimi bin Rashid
Saba	827	Raimi bin Rashid
Sungai Kebun	4,282	Raimi bin Rashid
Sungai Kedayan	241	Raimi bin Rashid
Tamoi	942	Raimi bin Rashid

These are further subdivided into 83 Kampongs (Villages).

According to the Constitution, the district is to be represented in the Legislative Council, the state legislature, by up to 7 members. As of 2023, five members have been appointed to represent the district in the legislature.

== Demographics ==
In Brunei–Muara District, the population increased from 279,924 in 2011 to 318,530 in 2021. In 2011, there were 143,625 males and 136,299 females living in 47,529 households with 45,953 occupied living quarters. By 2021, the number of males had risen to 167,650 and females to 150,880, with 61,776 households and 59,472 occupied living quarters. In 2020 the district's population was estimated to have increased to 316,100.

=== Religion ===
Religions in Brunei-Muara district (2016)
Religion	Percent
Islam	84.28%
Christianity	6.52%
Buddhism	6.61%
Other or not stated	2.59%

Brunei-Muara is a predominantly Muslim population. Christianity and Buddhism are also present in smaller yet notable proportions.

== Transportation ==
=== Road ===
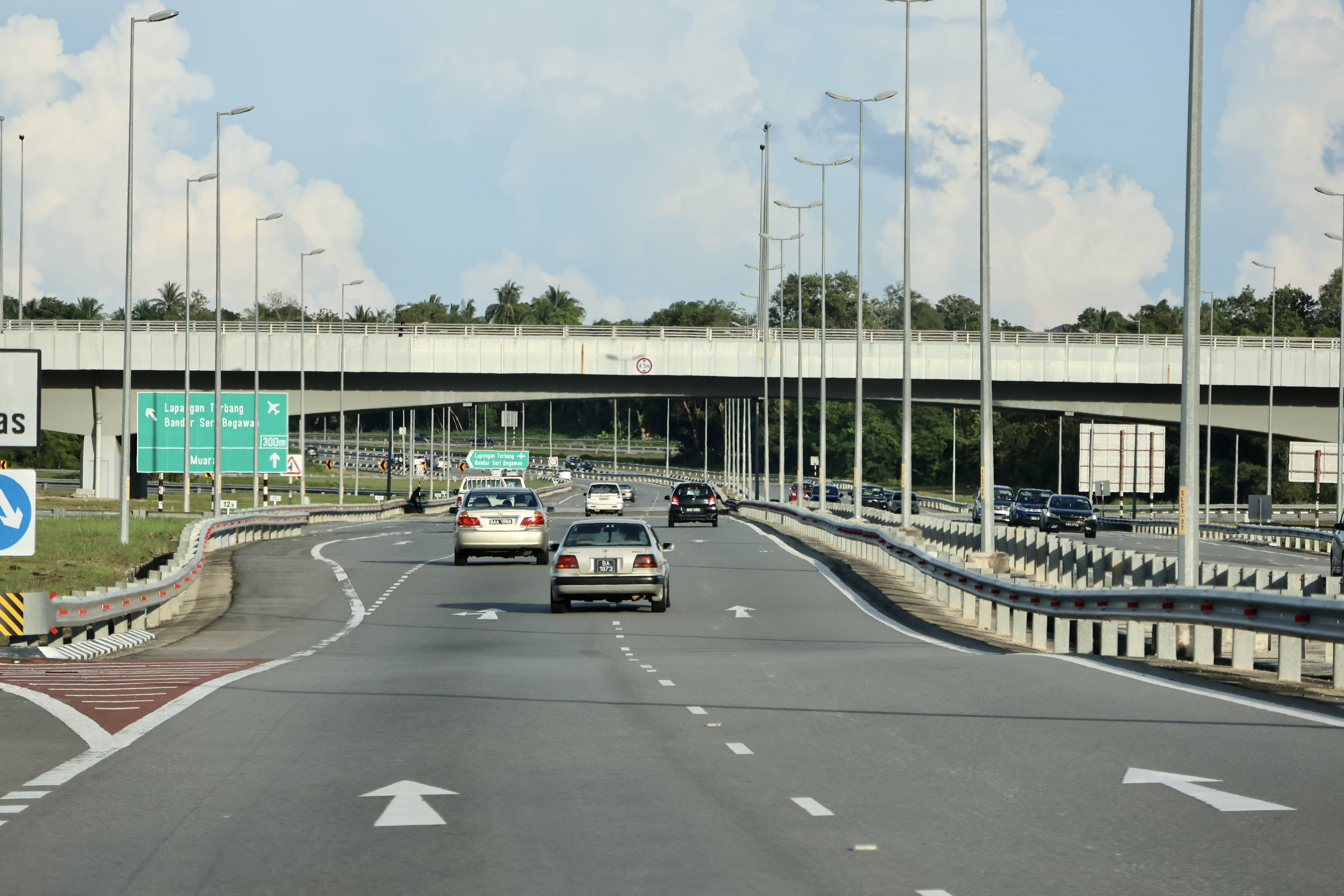
Muara–Tutong Highway

According to the Global Competitiveness Report 2008/2009, which rated Brunei 28th out of 134 developing economies, 7th in Asia, and 3rd in Southeast Asia, the country has excellent road infrastructure. Through the National Development Plan (RKN) 2007–2012, which allots over $600 million for highway projects, road building, paving, maintenance, and resurfacing, the government supports this. When state, district, and Royal Brunei Armed Forces roadways are included, the total length of roads in Brunei was 2,972.11 kilometres (1,846.78 mi) in 2008. The Sultan Hassanal Bolkiah Highway, the Muara–Tutong Highway, the widening of Jalan Kebangsaan Baru, and the newly constructed roads like the Jerudong Tungku Link and Tanah Jambu Link roads in the district. Additionally, the Public Works Department intends to build flyovers at the intersections of Jalan Pengiran Babu Raja, Jalan Tutong, the Muara–Tutong Highway, and Jalan Berakas Link Junction. As of 2022, the district's road network consisted of 1,997.73 kilometres (1,241.33 mi), out of which 89.7% were paved.

=== Rail ===
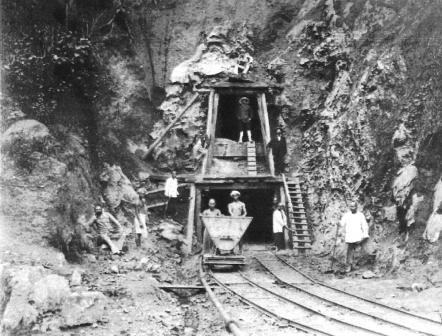
Brooketon Colliery

Brooketon Colliery, located in Mukim Serasa, operated a 2.5 km narrow gauge railway with a 711 mm gauge from the colliery to the deepwater harbour at Muara. The railway used wooden rails initially, later replaced with steel rails, and was serviced by two 0-4-0 steam locomotives built by Andrew Barclay Sons & Co. for leasing to Sir Charles Brooke. The first locomotive, named Marguerite Reine, was built in 1891, and the second, Brooketon, in 1897. The colliery transported approximately 650,000 tons of coal between 1888 and 1924, largely for the market in Labuan. The site was deemed unprofitable and decommissioned in 1924. Today, remnants of the railway and locomotives are protected under Brunei's Antiquities and Treasure Trove Act, with plans to exhibit them in an open-air museum to promote eco-tourism.

=== Water ===
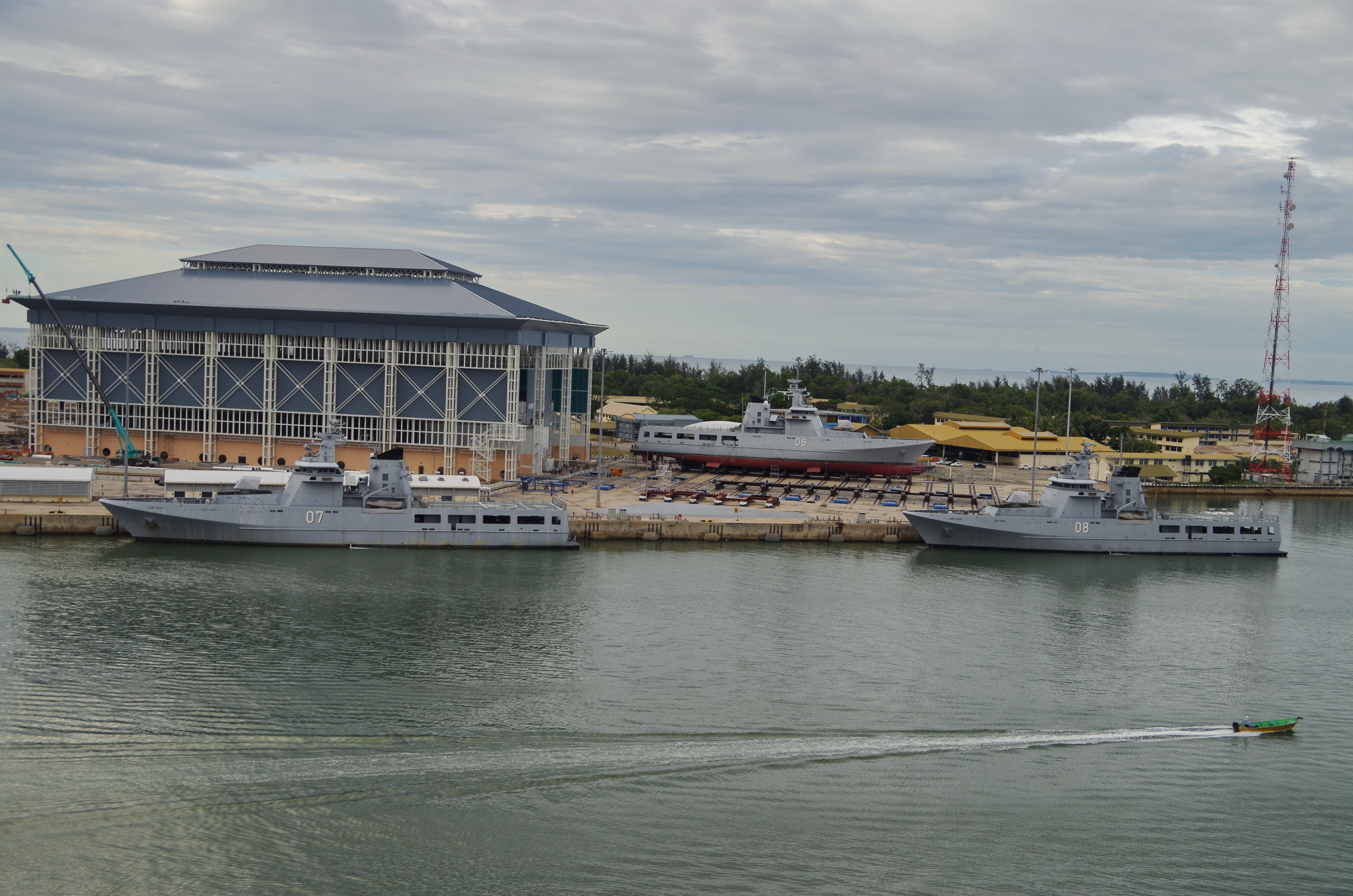
Muara Naval Base

The principal port and a vital trade gateway, Muara Port is situated in Brunei–Muara and is about 27 km from the city centre. It handles the majority of the nation's imports and exports. The Muara Container Terminal effectively handles all containerised freight since it is run by knowledgeable staff and has state-of-the-art equipment. Muara Port is ideally situated to meet both present demands and future expansion, especially in the East ASEAN Growth Area and the BIMP-EAGA. It can handle between 220,000 and 330,000 TEU cargo. Furthermore, because of its strategic location along the East–West maritime trade route and appropriateness for big container ships, Pulau Muara Besar, which spans 955 hectares in Brunei Bay, has been considered as the perfect site for a deep-sea container port. The Royal Brunei Navy's Muara Naval Base and the Serasa Ferry Terminal are two other establishments in Mukim Serasa.

=== Air ===
The national airline of Brunei, Royal Brunei Airlines (RBA), was founded on 18 November 1974, and is fully controlled by the government. In addition to code-sharing arrangements with a number of foreign airlines, such as Thai Airways International, Malaysia Airlines, and Singapore Airlines, the airline provides scheduled routes across Asia, the Middle East, Australasia, and the United Kingdom, enabling smooth travel to a number of locations. Brunei International Airport (BIA), which is situated in Brunei–Muara and has been in operation since 1974. It is a well-equipped service center with shops, dining options, and communication hubs.

== Economy ==
=== Agriculture ===
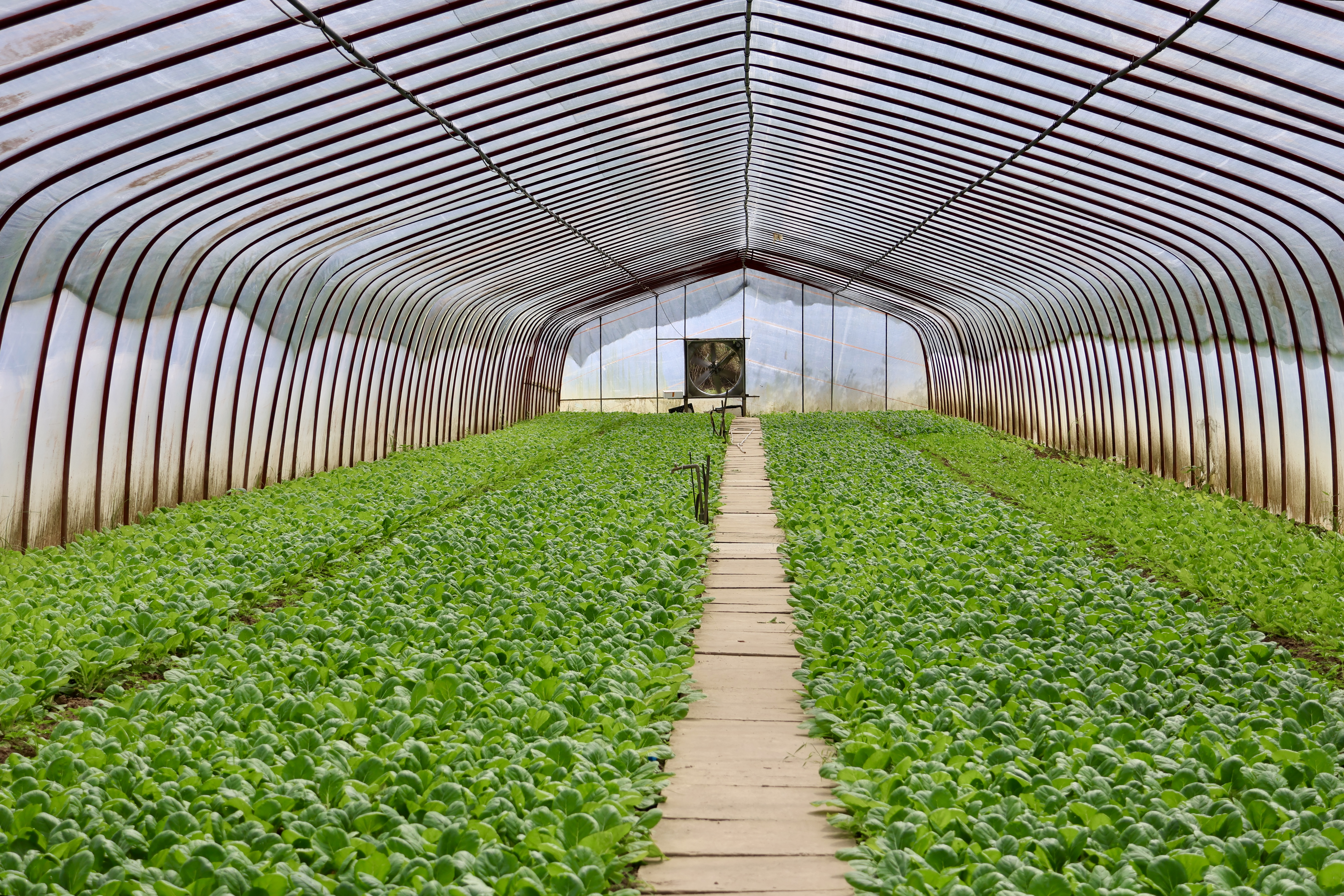
KKP Sibongkok

Brunei has prioritised the agriculture sector, which has tremendous development potential, in its attempts to diversify the economy. Driven by crops, cattle, and agrifood processing, the agricultural sector's gross production reached over B$200 million by 2008, nearly double the $113.02 million recorded in 1999. By 2013, agrifood sales are expected to reach B$340 million, a 512% rise from B$52.53 million in 2008. In 2009, the rice industry made significant strides with the harvest of 'Beras Laila,' which improved food security due to its high protein content and capacity to be grown twice a year. 26 agricultural development zones totalling 2,788.69 hectares are located in the district, with five of them (Batong, Bebuloh, Junjongan, Panchor Murai, and Wasan) designated for paddy agriculture.

The 2022 Agricultural Development Areas (KKP) in the district encompass 4,177.99 hectares, of which 1,799.13 hectares are designated for farmers and 1,159.95 hectares are utilised for stations and other uses. Important locations include KKP Terunjing for veterinary services, KKP Limpaki for various agricultural operations, KKP HBC Rimba for agriculture and floriculture, and KKP Mulaut for paddy and vegetables. KKP Sibongkok for vegetables and paddy, KKP Betumpu for livestock and a variety of crops, and KKP Sungai Tajau A for broilers are other noteworthy locations. A total of 251.45 hectares make up the Rural Agricultural Areas (RAA), of which 182.45 hectares are allotted to farmers for the production of fruits and 10 hectares are set aside for other purposes. KPLB Kulapis, KPLB Masin A, KPLB Pengkalan Batu, KPLB Tempayan Pisang, and KPLB Bukit Pawas are among the regions.

=== Oil and gas ===
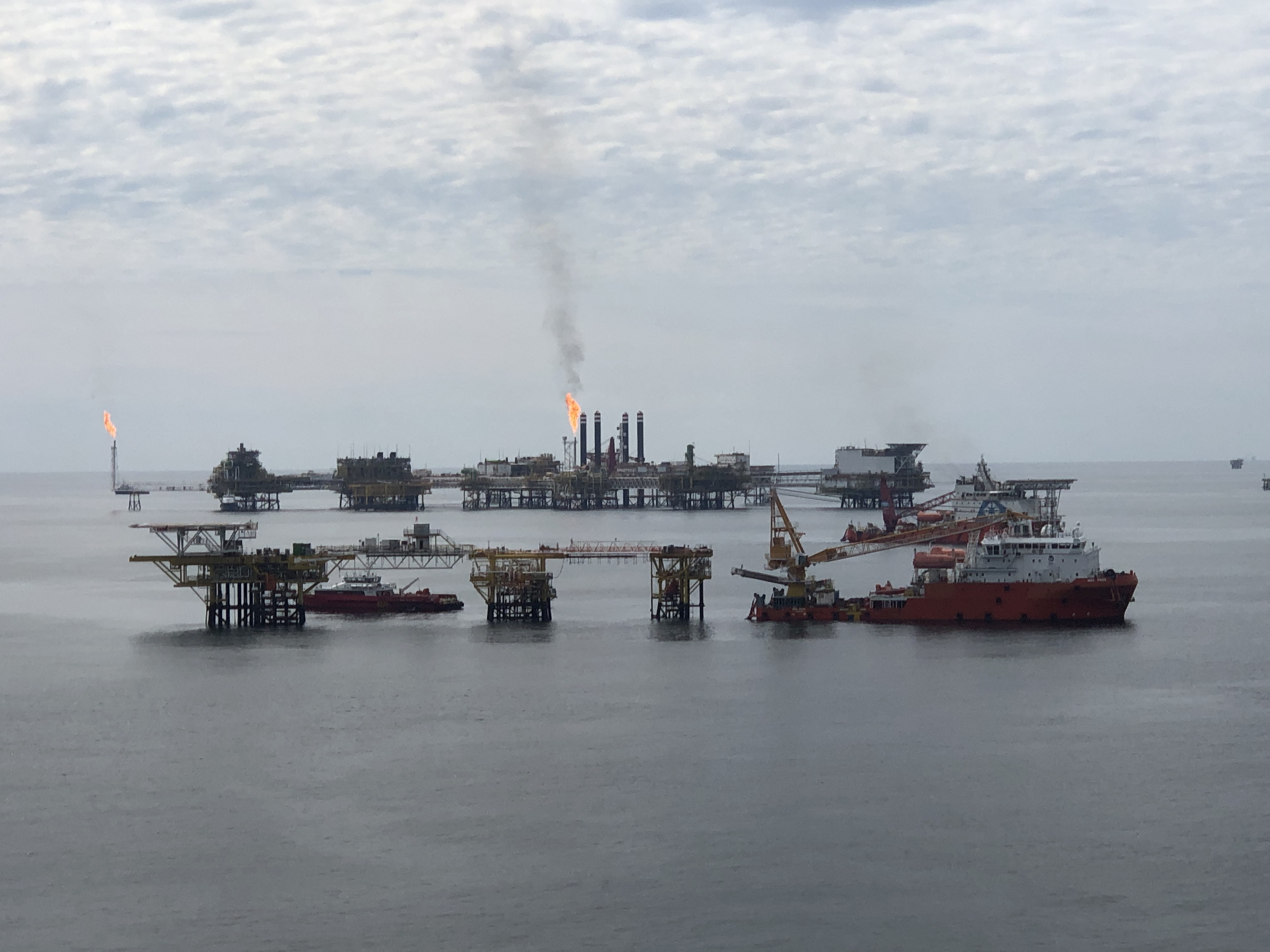
Champion oil field

Situated in 30 meters of water 70 kilometres northeast of Seria, the Champion oil field is the most productive in Brunei, accounting for 40% of the nation's known reserves and yielding over 100,000 barrels daily. The field comprises the Champion-7 core complex, which houses around 160 workers and has about 260 wells drilled from 40 platforms. It also has facilities for gaslift, compression, and water injection. The seventh field of the Brunei Shell Petroleum (BSP) began operations in January 1992 at Iron Duke oil field, 13 kilometres southwest of Champion. Since Gannet gas field in 1988, this was the first new field to begin production. Three wells that are connected to Champion via the multiphase pipeline of the business provide the production.

=== Petrochemical ===
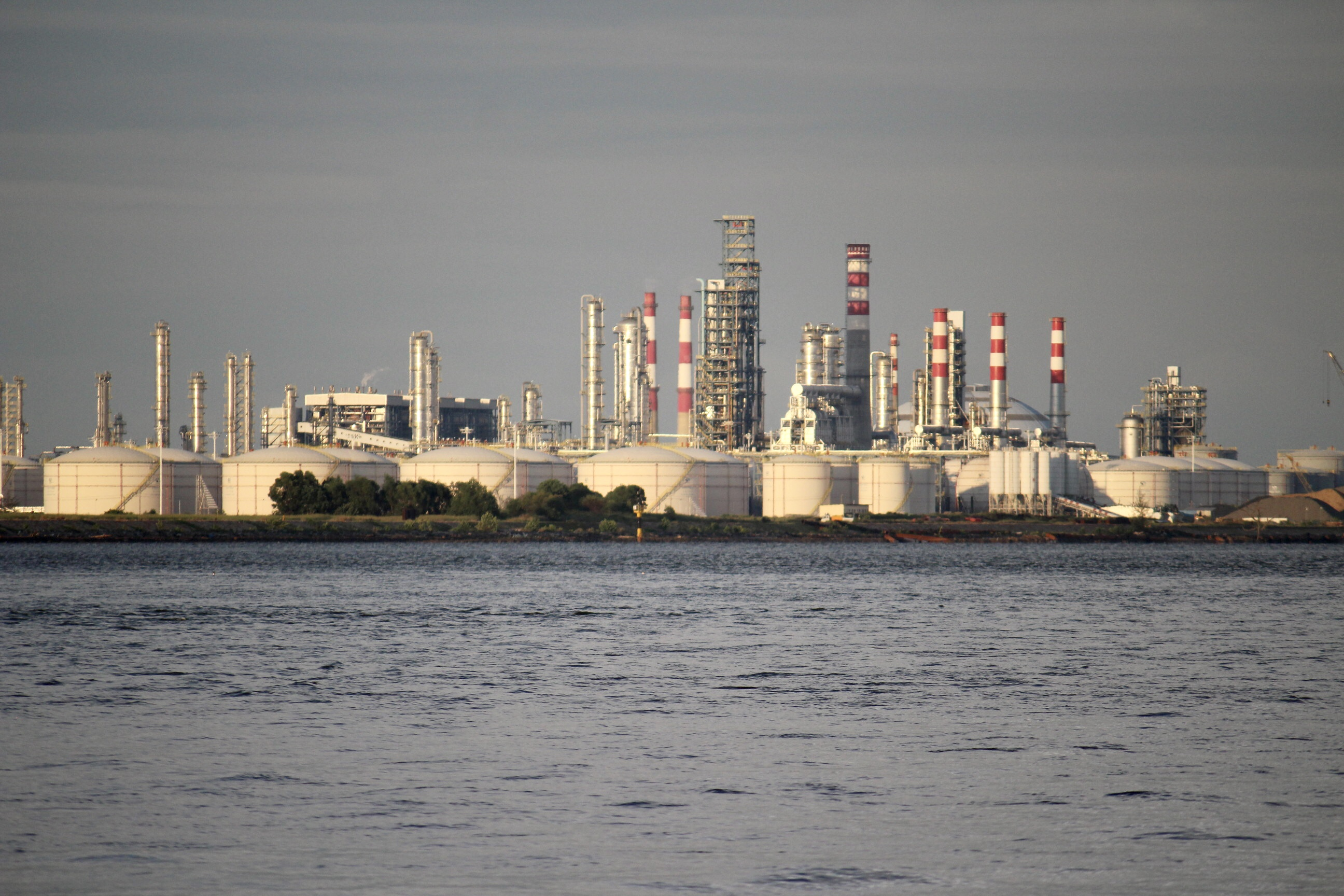
Hengyi Industries plant

In 2020, the Brunei–China joint venture Hengyi Industries generated US$3.5 billion in revenue from its oil refinery and petrochemical plant on Pulau Muara Besar, significantly impacting Bruneian economy. Hengyi's operations contributed 4.48% to Brunei's GDP and 50.57% to the country's total trade volume from January to September 2020. The company also accounted for 44.6% of Brunei's exports and 59.27% of imports during this period. Hengyi's output played a key role in boosting the nation's downstream sector despite the COVID-19 pandemic, with significant advancements toward the Wawasan Brunei 2035 economic goals. Additionally, Hengyi supplied 283,000 tonnes of fuel for the local market and is investing B$13.65 billion to expand its operations, increasing its refining capacity and downstream production.

=== Agrifood ===
526.02 hectares are allotted to livestock land in 2022; of this, 175.45 hectares are for broilers, 76.12 hectares are for layers, 16.50 hectares are for day-old chicks, and 16.50 hectares are for fertilised eggs. In addition, there are many categories such as 2.00 hectares for cattle and buffalo, 69.40 hectares for goats, 69.40 hectares for sheep, and 7.70 hectares for livestock feed. Nine deer and a variety of non-ruminant animals, including 80,686 village fowl, 1,833 muscovy ducks, 2,897 ducks, 71,082 quails, 213,071 old layer hens, and 43,189 chicken breeders, are among the livestock produced. In addition, a total of 741,034 eggs were produced in the area, including 101,181 village fowl eggs, 348 goose eggs, 5,326 muscovy duck eggs, 288,538 duck eggs, and 345,641 quail eggs.

=== Fisheries ===
For Brunei's population in 1992, which eats over 40 kilograms (88 lb) of animal protein per capita annually, much more than any other country in Southeast Asia, inshore fisheries constitute an essential source of this protein. In Brunei, traditional inshore fishing has a long history, with the majority of activity taking place in Brunei–Muara. In addition to 1,190 outboard fishing boats, the district had 659 licensed full-time and 1,566 part-time fishermen in 1986. 71.3% of the full-time fisherman called the district home. Despite the fact that there are two to three times as many part-time fisherman as full-timers, their catches have not been as well tracked, which emphasises the need for more precise statistics on their contributions. 408 tons of marine fish and 83 tons of freshwater fish are estimated to be consumed for subsistence by the Department of Fisheries.

== Development ==
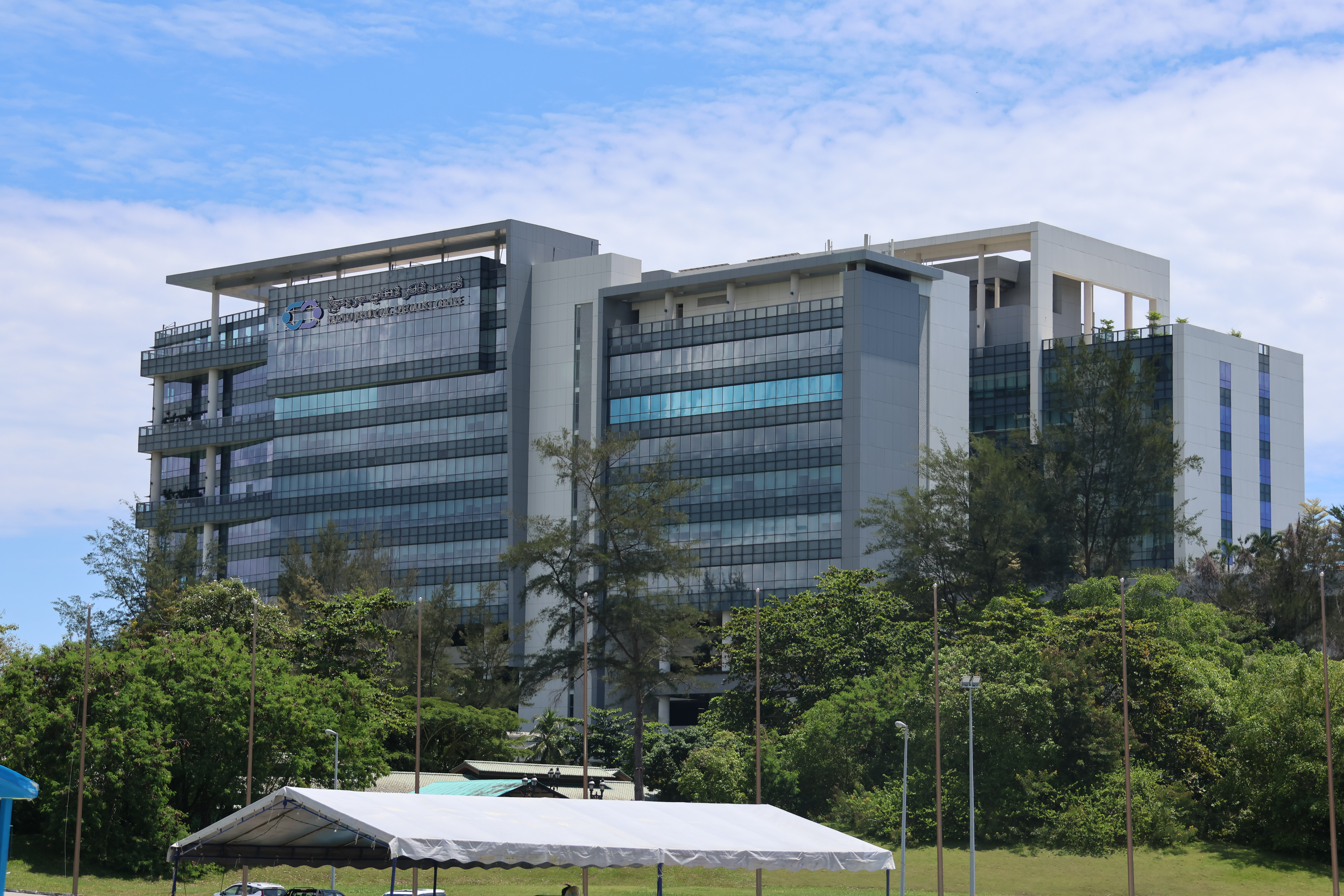
Pantai Jerudong Specialist Centre

Seven health centers offering almost free medical care have been constructed by the government as part of a comprehensive healthcare system. The Raja Isteri Pengiran Anak Saleha Hospital, a referral hospital, and the Jerudong Park Medical Centre (JPMC), a private hospital, are two of the major facilities. Gleneagles JPMC, which is well-known for its speciality cardiac care, is also located in Jerudong. In line with Wawasan Brunei 2035, Brunei prioritises free, high-quality education under the SPN21 educational system. Along with several private and religious schools that serve a range of educational requirements, the area is home to 64 government elementary schools, 23 secondary schools, and several higher education institutions, including Sultan Sharif Ali Islamic University, Seri Begawan Religious Teachers University College, Universiti Brunei Darussalam and Universiti Teknologi Brunei.

The Prime Minister's Office, the Ministry of Defence, the Ministry of Finance and Economy, and several more ministries concentrating on different areas including development, health, and education are important government departments. Beginning with the first resettlement initiatives in the 1950s, which moved people from Kampung Ayer and other regions to new locations like Bunut and Berakas, the government has a long history of providing housing options created by the National Housing Programme. Housing estates had been constructed by the 1960s, and the RPN Lambak Kanan had been founded in the 1970s. Since then, a number of housing initiatives have been unveiled, such as the Temporary Occupation-of-Land License (TOL) and the Landless Indigenous Citizens' Housing Scheme (STKRJ). To accommodate the expanding demands of the population, the RKN 2007-2012 specifies new housing developments in places like Kampong Salambigar and Kampong Rimba.

99.9% of Bruneians have access to clean piped water at the conclusion of the RKN 8, up from 99.7% at the end of the RKN 7. Along with several service reservoirs in high-density areas like Kampong Rimba, Kampong Lumapas, and Kampong Kilanas, two terminal reservoirs in Brunei–Muara at Kiarong and Lambak Kanan were built to enhance water delivery. In order to address the rising demand for water, the RKN 2007–2012 includes additional projects including the construction of new reservoirs at Terunjing and Berakas and the installation of new main pipelines. Four power plants are under the management of the Department of Electrical Services, while three more plants are run by Berakas Power Company. There are continuing initiatives to combine Brunei's three separate electrical networks and investigate alternate energy sources. The electrical system in the nation is 220–240V British standard; anything that requires 110V requires a converter.

== Tourism ==
=== Commerce ===
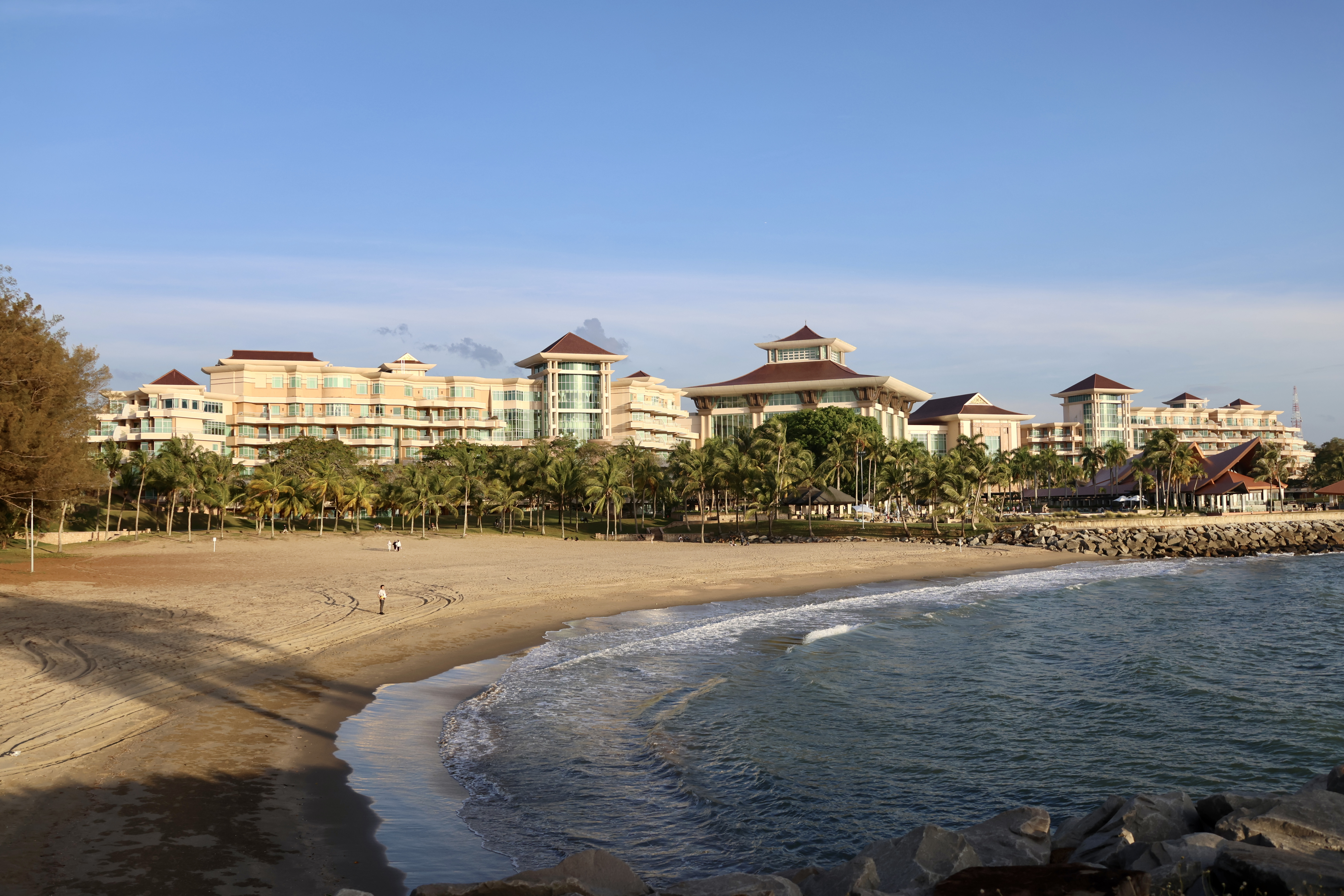
The Empire Brunei

The Empire Brunei is the only beach resort in Brunei. It was named Asia's Leading Resort in 2003–2004, the World Travel Awards' World's Leading Presidential Suite and Brunei's Leading Hotel from 2003–2005. While the Radisson Hotel, located in the historic capital, the Rizqun International Hotel is ideally situated in Brunei's retail and entertainment hub, Gadong. The Grand City Hotel, Jubilee Hotel, Kiulap Plaza Hotel, Le Gallery Suites Hotel, Orchid Garden Hotel, LR Asma Hotel, APEK Utama Hotel, Palm Garden Hotel, Riverview Hotel, Terrace Hotel, and The Centrepoint Hotel are among the other hotels in Brunei–Muara.

=== Landmarks ===
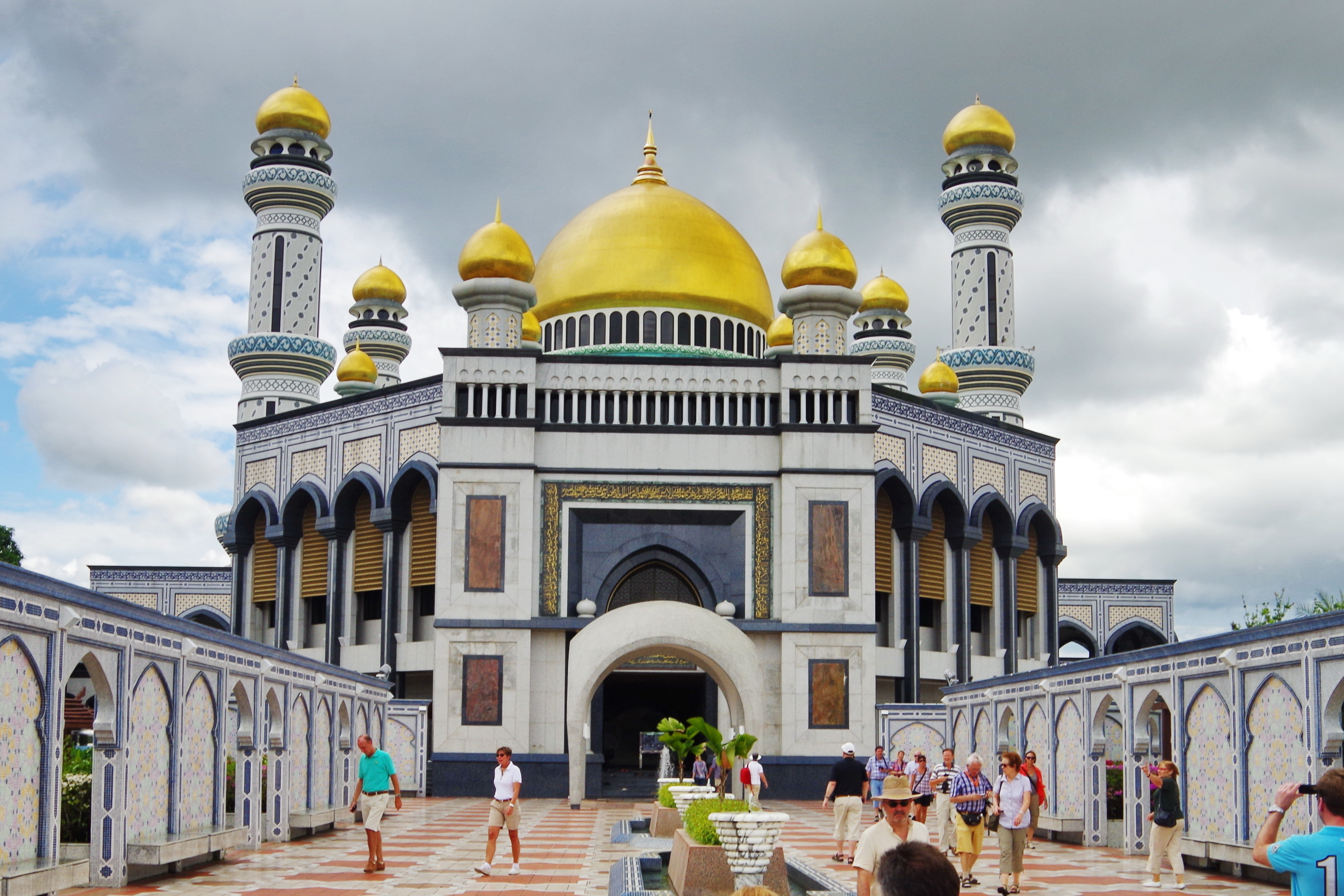
Jame' Asr Hassanil Bolkiah Mosque

Six mukims make up Kampung Ayer, the world's biggest water town and a historical site in Brunei. The community dates back hundreds of years. With almost 30,000 residents, it is a community of stilt homes connected by wooden walkways, and it has all the amenities of a modern city, including police stations, clinics, and schools. The primary means of transit here is via water taxi. Completed in 1958 and dedicated after the 28th Sultan of Brunei, the Omar Ali Saifuddien Mosque in Bandar Seri Begawan is a well-known Southeast Asian monument that represents contemporary Brunei. A 16th century royal barge replica located nearby was originally used for religious events. Furthermore, the biggest mosque in Brunei, the Jame' Asr Hassanil Bolkiah Mosque, was constructed to commemorate the 29th Sultan's silver jubilee. It is well-known for its elaborate minarets and golden domes, which are easily seen from the major thoroughfare entering the town.

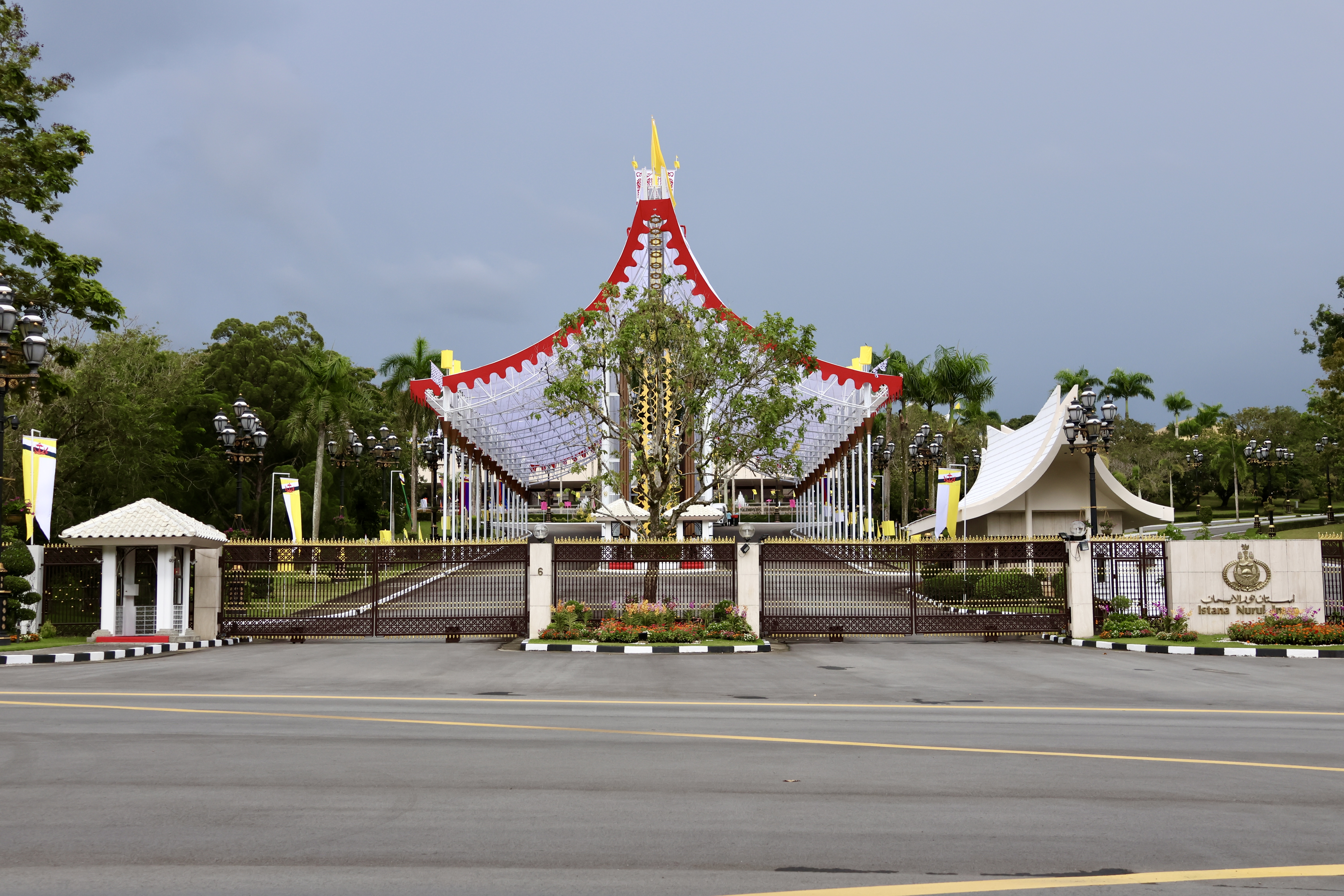
Istana Nurul Iman

The Sultan resides at Istana Nurul Iman, the biggest residential palace in the world. It is well-known for its golden domes, vaulted ceiling, and riverfront location, which make it a favourite photo subject. During Hari Raya Aidilfitri, the palace is accessible to the public, allowing locals and guests to interact with the Sultan and his family. The Brunei Energy Hub, Brunei Museum, Brunei Maritime Museum, Brunei History Centre, Kota Batu Archaeological Park and the Malay Technology Museum offer historical and cultural insights by showcasing Bruneian history and antique instruments utilised in traditional industries. The Royal Regalia Museum in Bandar Seri Begawan is home to ceremonial regalia such as the coronation crowns and royal chariot. To further improve the visitor experience, the Kampong Ayer Cultural and Tourism Gallery has interactive exhibits and presentations about Kampung Ayer. One of Brunei's oldest still standing structures is Bubungan Dua Belas, which is situated along Jalan Subok in Kota Batu and was constructed in 1906. With sweeping views over Kampong Ayer, it was once the home of British Residents and High Commissioners.

=== Recreation ===
Views of the palace can be seen nearby at Taman Persiaran Damuan, which is close to the royal palace. It is a well-liked location for runners and visitors alike and has six outdoor sculptures created by ASEAN artists. Situated along the Muara–Tutong Highway, Bukit Shahbandar Forest Recreation Park boasts a 70 hectare environment perfect for bicycling, trekking, and running, as well as an observation tower with panoramic views. There are nine hills in Jerudong Park, which is popular with daring hikers, and 199 hectares of beautiful paths, picnic areas, and an observation tower at Berakas Forest Recreation Park. Last but not least, Tasek Lama Recreational Park, one of the oldest in the city, offers a haven for people and families with its rich vegetation and natural waterfall.

Tungku Beach is located just north of The Empire Brunei on the coastal highway. It's a great place to hang out with picnic tables and giant casuarina trees for shade. A local favourite, Jerudong Beach is well-known for its wet market, where one can purchase fresh fish and vegetables and enjoy vigorous walking and running amidst picturesque surroundings and sea wind. In addition, Muara and Serasa Beaches are well-liked, particularly by families, because of their facilities, which include food stands, bathrooms, changing areas, and picnic areas.
