= Geology of Brunei =

The geology of Brunei is primarily made up of Cenozoic rocks overlying deeper rock units on the island of Borneo. Rocks from the Oligocene through the Holocene are up to 15 kilometers thick.

The oldest rocks are part of the Meligan Formation and Temburong Formation in the east and are the deformed remnants of floodplain sediments. An unconformity separates the older rocks from younger Middle Miocene and Pliocene rocks. Among Neogene sediments, geologists distinguish the Setap, Belait, Miri, Seria and Liang Formations. The Setap Formation is marine shale, while the Belait Formation includes thick sandstones and some reef limestone. Both the Miri and Seria Formations include sandstones and shales and the Liang Formation preserves brackish water sediments and cobbles, together with gastropod and crustacean fossils. Faults that developed in these thick sedimentary rocks help to trap oil and gas.

== Natural resource geology ==
The onshore Seria oil field was discovered in 1929 and a second onshore field was discovered in the late 20th century. But most oil and gas in Brunei is found offshore. The 12-kilometer-thick Baram Delta Province holds most hydrocarbon reserves, often sourced from land plants which formed centimeter thick layers in the delta sediments. The northward progradation of the paleo-Baram delta controls the temperature and pressure under which hydrocarbons formed. There are two main types of oil in the country: waxy, low-sulfur crude and high-sulfur crude.

Natural gas is situated deeper than oil and deposits in the country have low nitrogen, hydrogen sulfide and carbon dioxide contamination. Southwest Ampa, Fairley and Champion are the principal offshore oil fields. Southwest Ampa is in 40 meters of water, in an anticline structure with growth faults that split the field into three parts with up to 730 reservoir units spanning the Miocene to the Pliocene. The Champion Field is slightly deeper in 45 meters of water, split into the Champion East and Champion West fields, as well as Champion Main. The Main Field hosts the most oil of the three, producing both heavy and light crude—although well pressure has tended to drop rapidly, limiting production of natural gas.
