= Kota Batu, Brunei =

Kota Batu
- Village
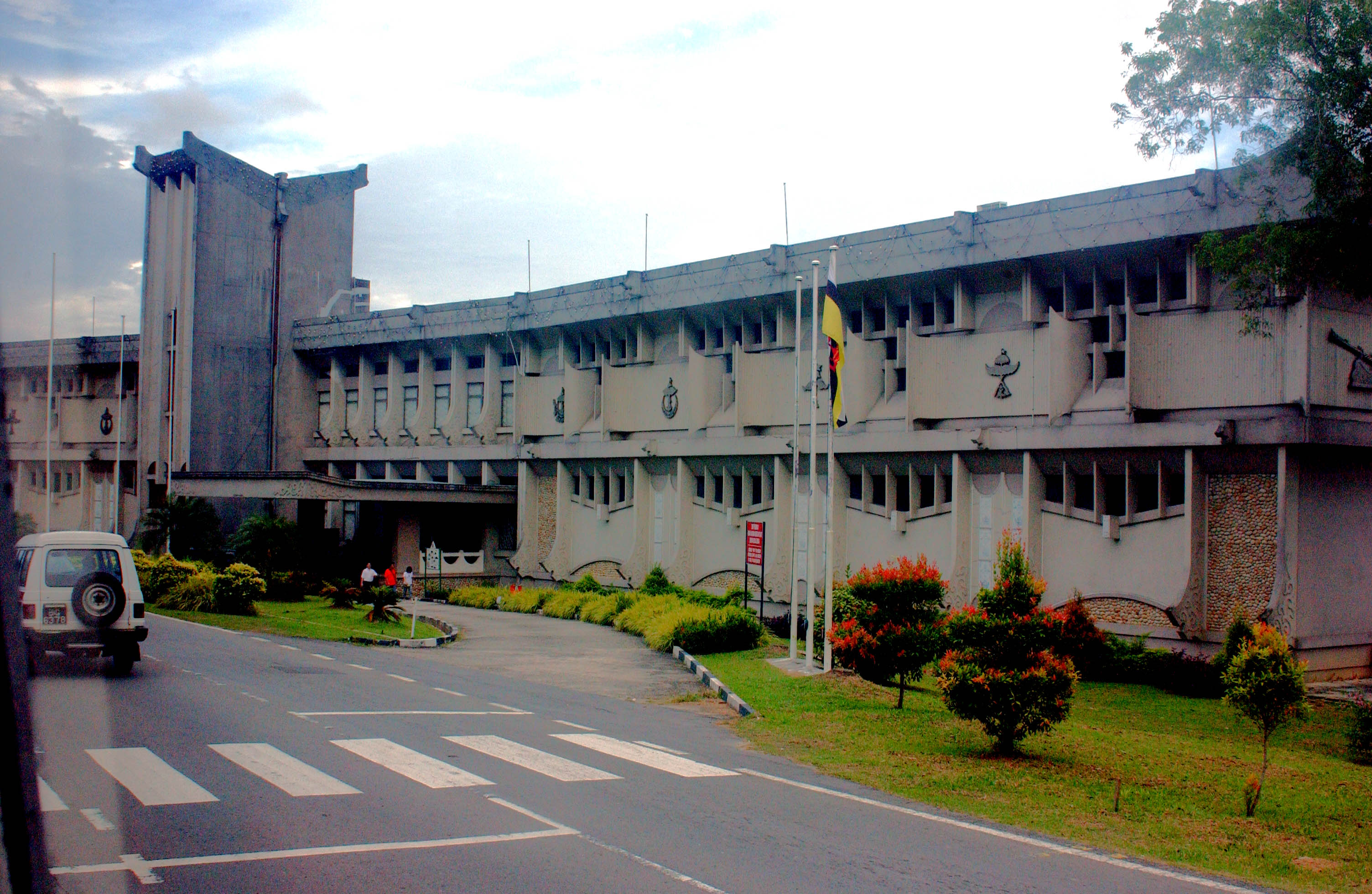
- Brunei Museum

- Location in Brunei
- Coordinates: 4°52′56″N 114°57′53″E
- Country: Brunei
- District: Brunei-Muara
- Mukim: Kota Batu

Government
  - Village head: Hanipah Junit
- Postcode: BD1517

Kota Batu (Malay pronunciation: [kota batu]) is a historical as well as populated area in Bandar Seri Begawan, the capital of Brunei. It is home to the Kota Batu archaeological site, a few of the country's museums and two mausoleums of the earliest Sultans of Brunei. However, the place is still populated and at present it is a neighbourhood of the capital.

== Name ==
"Kota Batu" is the Malay term which literally means "Stone Fort".

== History ==
Kota Batu was believed to be the ancient capital of Brunei. During the Castilian War, the Spaniards captured the city on April 16, 1578; the Bruneians retook it in June 26, 1578. The city remained the capital before the emergence of Kampong Ayer, which is further inland, and over the Brunei River, during the Brunei Civil War in the 17th century. According to Bruneian history source Silsilah Raja-Raja Brunei, Kota Batu was founded by Sultan Sharif Ali. Among the founding workers were Chinese people. The palace, masjid and educational institutions were built in the quickly developing center of the Sultanate. During the reign of Sultan Muhammad Hasan, there were "two palaces within a square compound surrounded by a wall" in Kota Batu.

Antonio Pigafetta's report from 1521 and the Boxer Codex from 1590, on the other hand, provide more comprehensive sources about Kota Batu. These documents clearly describe the topography of Kota Batu based on the locations of the dignitaries' and residents' houses, the Sultan's palace, and the factories made of stone. For instance, Pigafetta stated in the report that, "... the city (Brunei) was entirely built on salt water except for the King's palace and the residence of some dignitaries, which was in front of the Sultan's palace there was a wall made of stones large with fortress towers like a defensive wall." The site of the currency and pottery factories in the area is mentioned in the Boxer Codex.

However, no remnants in the form of palace construction sites or dignitary residences for the Sultan have been discovered to far. Naturally, this is related to the bamboo and wood culture seen in Malay architectural construction, which is readily damaged and hard to find. Archaeologists have been able to pinpoint the locations of the coin and pottery workshops mentioned by Pigafetta and the Boxer Codex, though, thanks to the finding of coins and pieces of regional pottery in the Kota Batu highlands. It is certain that the location of the Sultan's palace is close to the coin pieces based on the discovery of these items. Except for the palace of Sultan Muhammad Hasan, which was constructed at Tanjung Chandana and is the one that was on Berambang Island, no oral tradition in Brunei has ever mentioned the Sultan's palace in Kota Batu.

== Administration ==
As Kota Batu is still a populated area, it is primarily gazetted as a village, the third- and lowest-level administrative division of Brunei. It is one of the villages under the mukim of the same name, which a subdistrict of Brunei-Muara District. Kota Batu is also a designated postcode area with the postcode BD1517. However, the archaeological site in Kota Batu as well as its vicinity, which includes the mausoleums and the museums' area, have also been gazetted under the Antiquities and Treasure Trove Act of 1967 and thus managed by the government's Museums Department.

Since 2007, Kota Batu has also been incorporated into Bandar Seri Begawan municipal area and thus, becomes a neighbourhood of the capital.

== Places of interest ==
In regard to the historical importance of Kota Batu, a few museums have been established in the area. The Brunei Museum is the national museum of Brunei and the current building was inaugurated in 1972, although it is temporarily closed since 2014 until further notice. The Malay Technology Museum was opened in 1984 and has galleries mainly dedicated to depicting the traditional lifestyle and technology which had been practiced by the Kampong Ayer residents throughout history. The most recent museum in Kota Batu is the Brunei Darussalam Maritime Museum; it was inaugurated in 2015 and mainly exhibits the artifacts from the Brunei Shipwreck which was discovered off the coast of Brunei in 1997. Kota Batu is also home to two royal tombs which belong to the third and fifth Sultans of Brunei, Sharif Ali and Bolkiah.

The Kota Batu Archaeological Park was discovered in the 1950s and it was the first one in the archaeological history of the country. Kota Batu archaeological site has since become the largest and most prominent, which has since yielded important artifacts, most notably Chinese porcelain which are datable to the Song dynasty (960–1279 AD). The site has also unearthed remains of stone structures from the place eventually obtained the name. The site has now been made into an 'archaeological park' where it is opened to the public.

Pulau Terindak, located in the Brunei River near the Brunei Darussalam Maritime Museum and the Brunei Technology Museum, spans 250 square miles (650 km^{2}) and was strategically built close to the riverbanks. This man-made island served as a control post and a jetty for merchant ships visiting Brunei during the 15th and 16th centuries, also providing refuge for traders from pirate threats and harsh winds. A significant historical event on the island occurred during the reign of Sultan Sharif Ali, who ordered the construction of a protective fort and defensive position to safeguard the country from enemy attacks, leading the Brunei people to build the island near the river’s edge.

== Notable people ==
- Mohammad Tashim (born 1970), syariah judge and politician
