= Battle of Kota Batu (1578) =

Successful Spanish attack on the Bruneian capital in 1578

- Part of the Castilian War
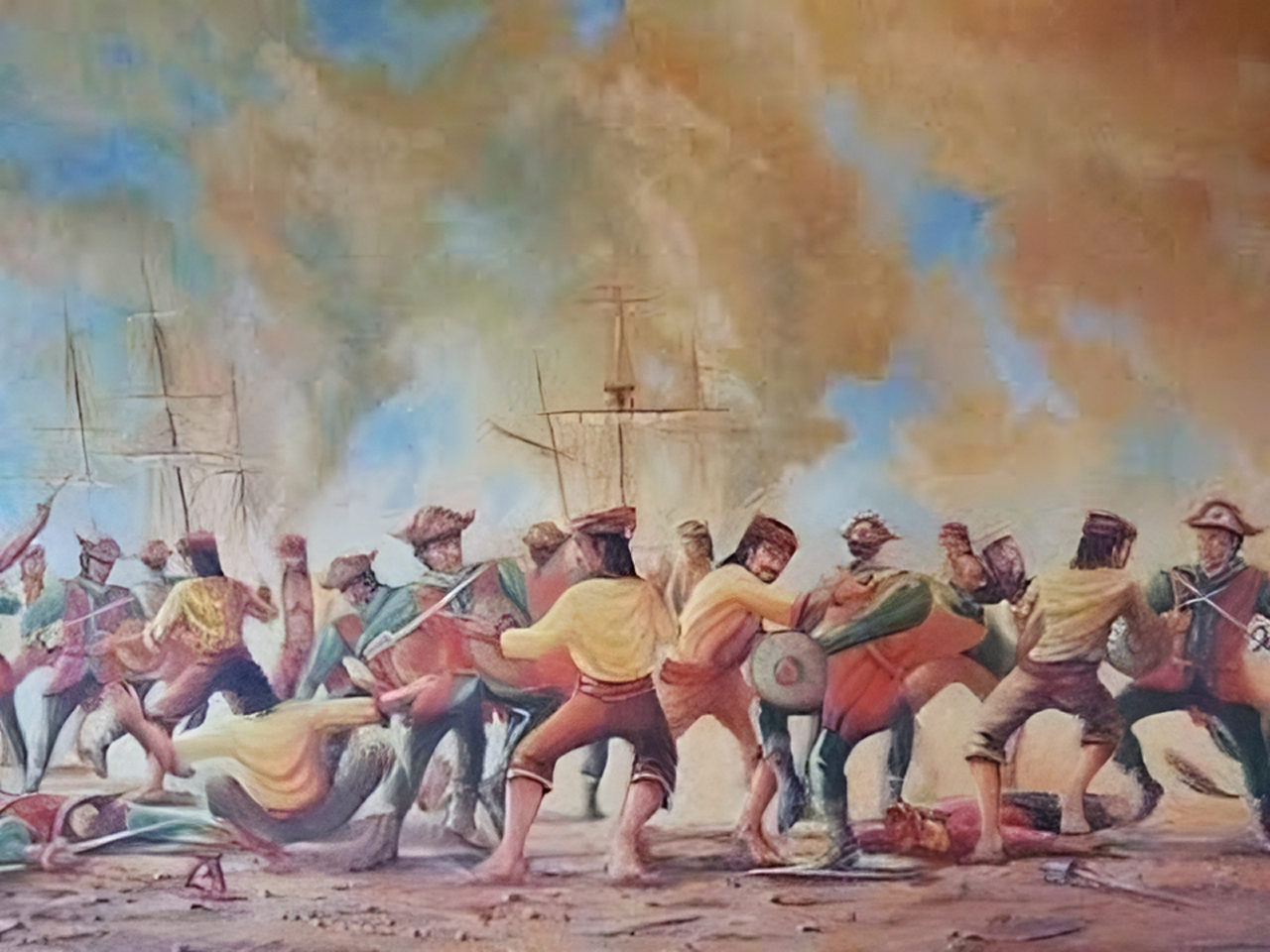
- Bruneian forces fighting Spanish forces
Date	14–16 April 1578 (2 days)
Location	Kota Batu, Brunei 4°52′56″N 114°57′53″E
Result	Spanish victory: Destruction of Kota Batu; Independence of Sulu from Brunei
Territorial changes	The Bruneian capital is destroyed and captured by Spanish forces

Belligerents
Spanish Empire: Captaincy General of the Philippines	Bruneian Sultanate

Commanders and leaders
De Sande Picón	Sultan Saiful Rijal

Strength
2,200 men 40 ships	50 ships

Casualties and losses
Unknown	50 ships destroyed
- Nearly the entire civilian population of Kota Batu was massacred by the Spanish after the battle.

The Battle of Kota Batu was a military operation in which Spanish forces successfully besieged and destroyed Kota Batu, the capital of the eponymous sultanate. Afterwards, Sultan Saiful Rijal and his followers retreated to Jerudong.

== Battle ==
The conflict between Brunei and Spain began with the sending of a letter by Francisco de Sande to the Sultan of Brunei. In the letter, de Sande urged the Sultan of Brunei to stop sending missionaries to the islands of Borneo and the Philippines, which were already under Spanish control. As an alternative, de Sande offered the entry of Catholic priests to spread Christianity in Bruneian territory. Sultan Saiful Rijal considered the letter an insult to Islam and flatly denied the request. This action angered de Sande, considering the refusal an insult to Spain.

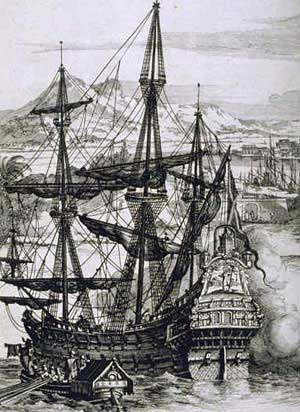
A Spanish galleon

In March 1578, de Sande sailed from Manila to Kota Batu with 40 warships and 2,200 soldiers. Upon arriving in the waters of Kota Batu, de Sande sent a second letter to the Sultan of Brunei with the aim of allowing Christian priests to enter Brunei, but this letter was also rejected. On 14 April 1578, de Sande launched an attack on Kota Batu, where the Spanish fleet bombarded and destroyed 50 Brunei ships in the harbor. This attack was intended to overthrow Sultan Saiful Rijal. As a result of the attack, the Sultan's palace and property fell into Spanish hands, while the population of Brunei was massacred and the Brunei Grand Mosque was burned. However, Sultan Saiful Rijal and his followers managed to escape and retreat to Jerudong.

== Aftermath ==
In spite of the Spanish victory in Kota Batu, cholera or dysentery plagued them, fleeing from the capital after 72 days, after a counterattack by Bendahara Sakam which expelled them with 1,000 men, returning to Manila in 26 June 1578. Having a minimal effect on the sultanate however led to the independence of the Sultanate of Sulu and the loss of Luzon to the Spanish.

== See also ==
- Spanish East Indies
- History of the Philippines
- Spanish–Moro conflict
- Battle of Manila (1570)

== Sources ==
- Agoncillo, Teodoro C. (1990) [first published 1960]. History of the Filipino People (8th ed.). Quezon City: Garotech Publishing. ISBN 971-8711-06-6.
- McAmis, Robert Day (2002). Malay Muslims: The History and Challenge of Resurgent Islam in Southeast Asia. Eerdmans. ISBN 978-0-8028-4945-8.
