= Brunei Darussalam Maritime Museum =

- Muzium Maritim Brunei Darussalam
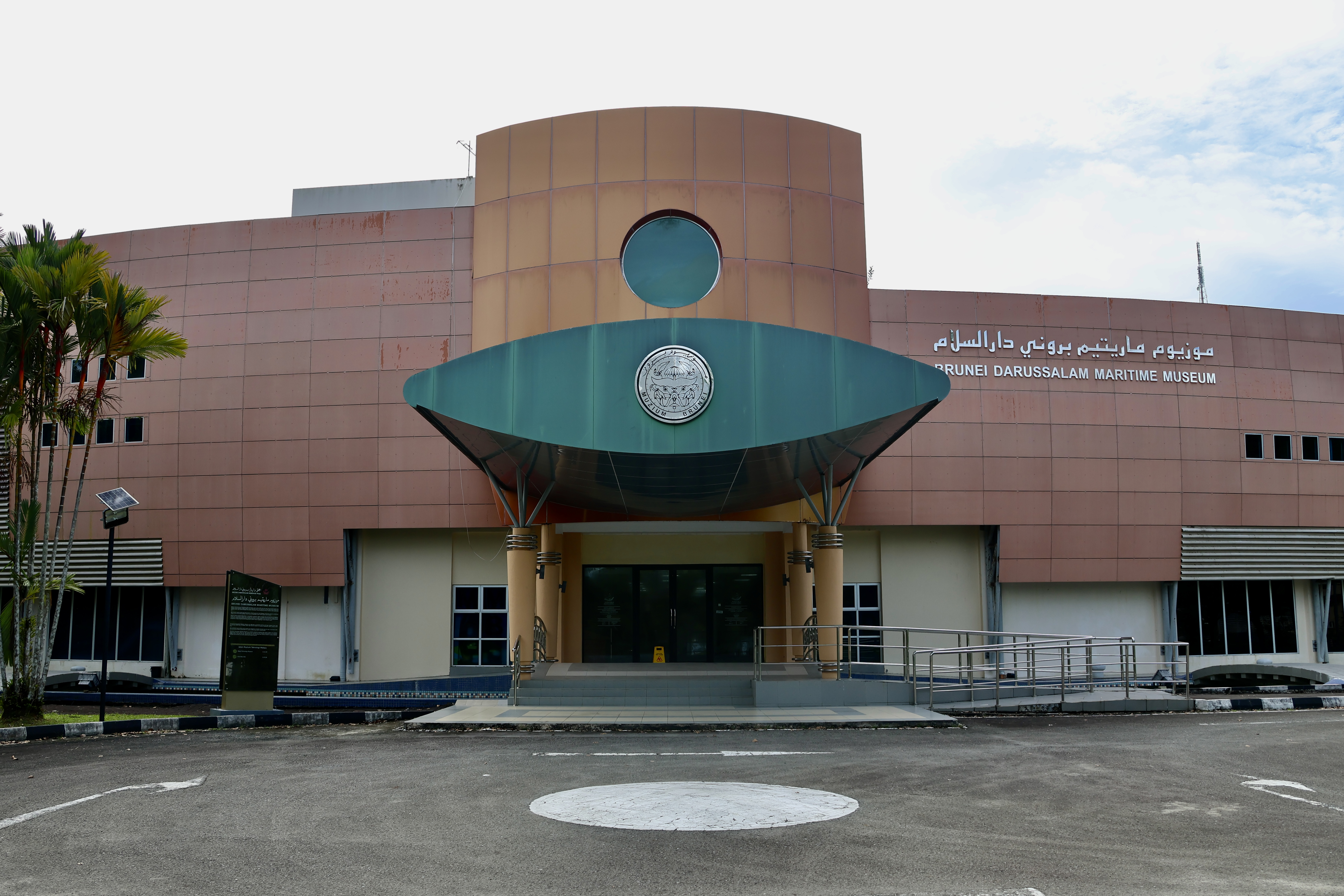
- The museum in 2026

- Location in Brunei
- Established: 23 March 2015
- Location: Kota Batu, Brunei
- Coordinates: 4°52′54.7″N 114°58′06.9″E
- Type: Maritime museum

The Brunei Darussalam Maritime Museum (Malay: Muzium Maritim Brunei Darussalam) is a museum located at Kota Batu, Brunei.

== Background ==
The museum is located within the historical area of Kota Batu. The building is a short walk to the Malay Technology Museum.

The construction began in December 2006 and completed sometime in 2008. However, delays caused it to only be opened to the public after seven years. The museum was officially launched by Crown Prince Al-Muhtadee Billah on 23 March 2015. The construction cost around five million Brunei dollars.

== Exhibits ==
The museum comprises three galleries. Two of the galleries are for permanent exhibition where as the third gallery is for temporary exhibition.

The first gallery is called 'the Brunei Shipwreck' and displays a selection from the 13,500 artefacts recovered from a shipwreck site about 32 nautical miles from the coast of Brunei in 1997. The collection consists of foreign ceramics dating back to the 15th and 16th centuries. This gallery is the de facto focal point, thus a permanent exhibition, of the museum.

The second gallery is named 'Kota Batu as a Trading Centre'. This exhibition is the manifestation of the development of Kota Batu as an important centre of human activities in Brunei within the 14th and 17th centuries. The exhibits include models of foreign ships that came to Brunei for trade during that time as well as selected local cultural items. This is also a permanent exhibition.

The third gallery houses temporary exhibitions. At the time of the museum's launch, it displayed Quanzhou Maritime Museum's Maritime Silk Road exhibition and focused on trade relations between Brunei and China during the high days of the Maritime Silk Road.

== Archeology ==
In 1997, a 500-year-old shipwreck was inadvertently found in the country's sea waters by the corporation Elf Petroleum Asia B V. The wreckage is situated on the seafloor of Brunei's Champion oil field at a depth of 62 meters. During the Ming dynasty, the Chinese government had a ship that traveled to Southeast Asia in the late 15th and early 16th centuries with a cargo of goods. Around 10,000 artefacts in great condition, including pottery, ceramics, glass, beads, iron, and other items, are thought to have been discovered strewn across an area of around 100 square meters, according to the study report on the relics discovered within the ship.

4,870 artefacts from Jiangxi province falling under the category of blue and white pottery, or blue and white ware, are among those that have been successfully gathered. Plates, dishes, jugs, glasses, coasters, bowls, pots, kettles, bottles, and pots are among them. In addition, 190 different kinds of white pottery from the Chinese province of Fujian were discovered. These pottery pieces included plates, bowls, and cups. The next kind of pottery is celadon, which is indigenous to China's Guangdong province. Furthermore, 14th-century Thai ceramic pottery, or stoneware, was also gathered. This porcelain comes from the Si Satchanalai area in central Thailand, giving it the name Si Satchamlai pottery or Sawankhalok pottery. These artefacts include clay bowls, jars, plates (dishes), and bottles in a variety of shapes.

Furthermore, ceramics from Vietnam were discovered in the wreckage, which dates back to the 15th and 16th centuries and includes white and blue-and-putch style pottery as well as stoneware bowls, urns, and flower vases. Glass bracelets, ash stones (grindstones) made of granite stones, and beads made of stone, glass, and tin are among the other objects that were successfully gathered. It is assumed that all of the confiscated goods originate from China and Vietnam. The finding of historical artefacts from this shipwreck undoubtedly supports the claims made by several Chinese and Western sources on Brunei's position as the principal commerce hub in northwest Borneo, particularly during the 15th and 16th centuries. This demonstrates that China halted in Vietnam and Thailand before the traders arrived in Brunei.

After the wreckage was found in 2013, the Department of Brunei Museums and the Maritime Museum has carried out research on the possible occurrence of shipwrecks at Tanjong Batu. After Bob Hewitt found the first pottery fragments in the region in 1974, the museum began a mission in 1975 to gather fragments at Tanjong Batu Beach. Up to 193 pieces of Tongan greenware pottery from the Song dynasty, which has been popular in Southeast Asia markets since the 12th century, have been acquired by this effort.

== See also ==
- List of museums in Brunei
