= Serasa Bay =

Bay in Brunei-Muara District, Brunei

- Teluk Serasa (Malay)
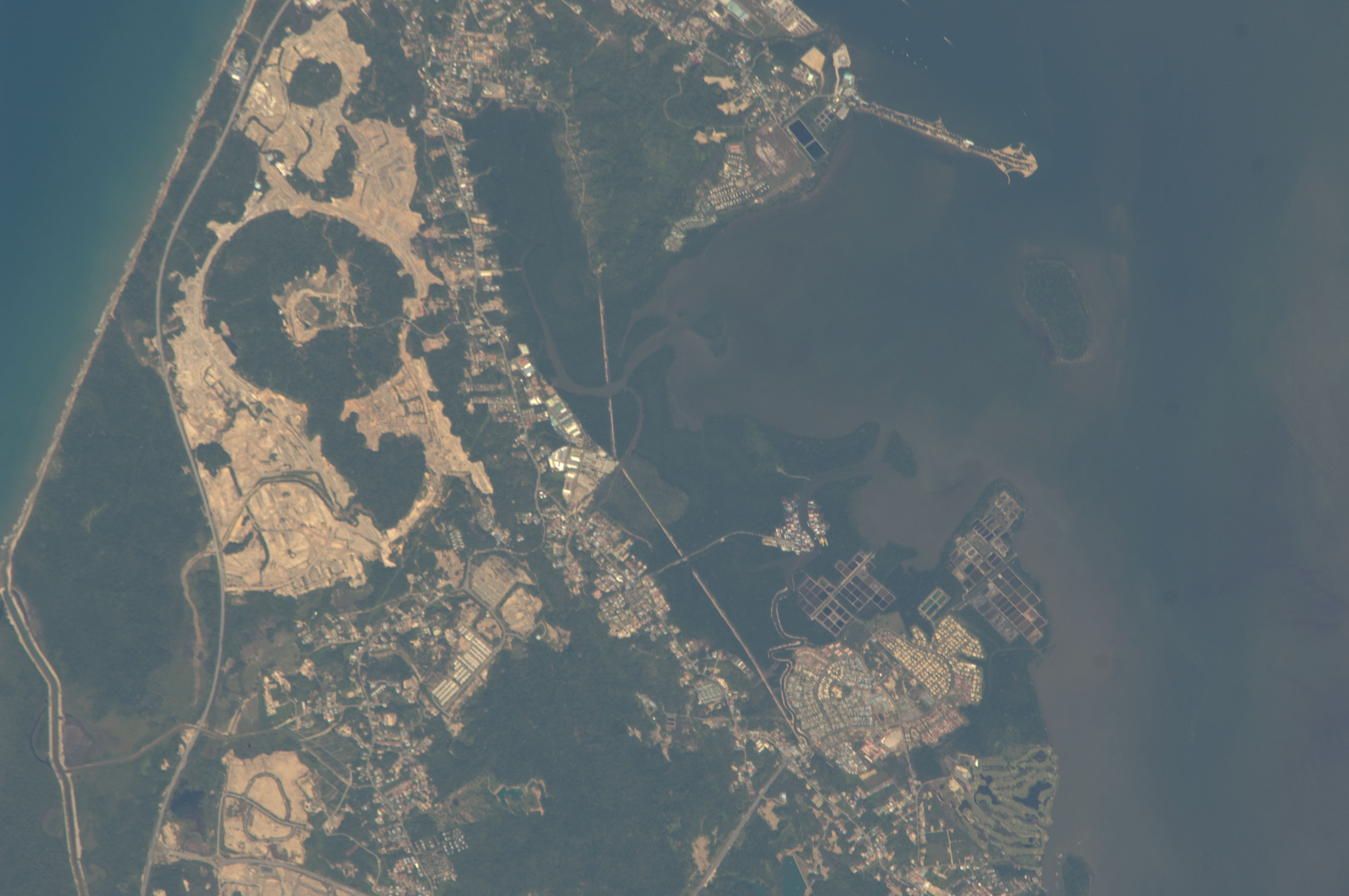
- Serasa Bay in 2010

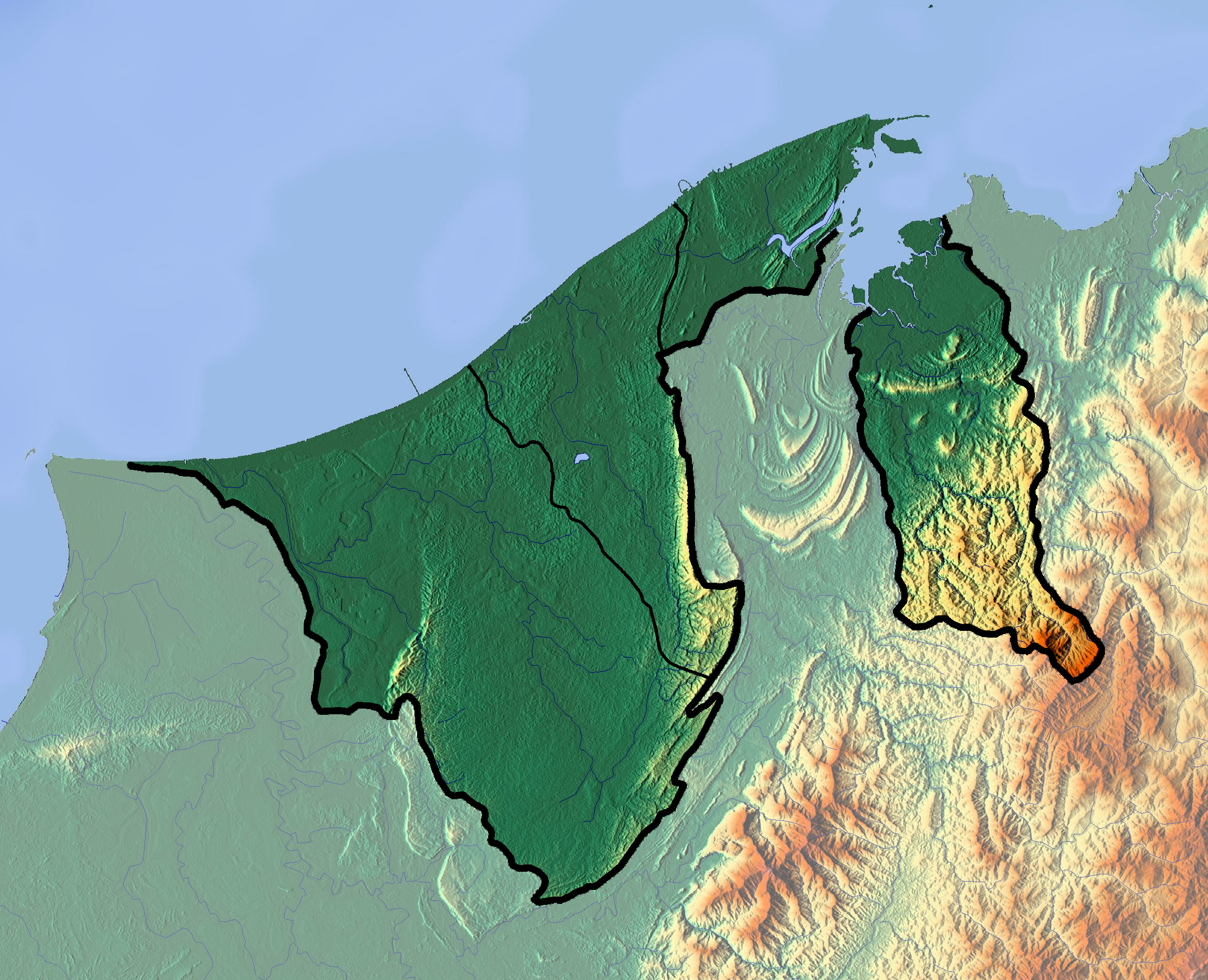
- Location within Brunei
- Location: Brunei-Muara, Brunei
- Coordinates: 4.9889326°N 115.0525302°E
- Type: Bay
- River sources: Salar and Mentiri
- Primary outflows: South China Sea
- Islands: Bedukang and Si Mangga Besar

Serasa Bay (Malay: Teluk Serasa) is a bay in Brunei-Muara District, Brunei. The waters within the bay is calm but are noted to be polluted by industrial complexes, oil released from ships due to the close proximity of the Muara Port and sewage from sewage plants. Fish cages were used to capture fishes such as red tilapia, grouper and barramundi.

A 1.5 kilometres (0.93 mi) long sand spit was completed and later became the Serasa Beach. In early 1988, gathering of water quality was done before the releasing of sewage from Muara Sewage Treatment Plant. It is also reported in 1989, Penaeus monodon and Penaeus setiferus were farmed in the bay.
