= Malay Technology Museum =

Ethnographic museum in Brunei

- Muzium Teknologi Melayu
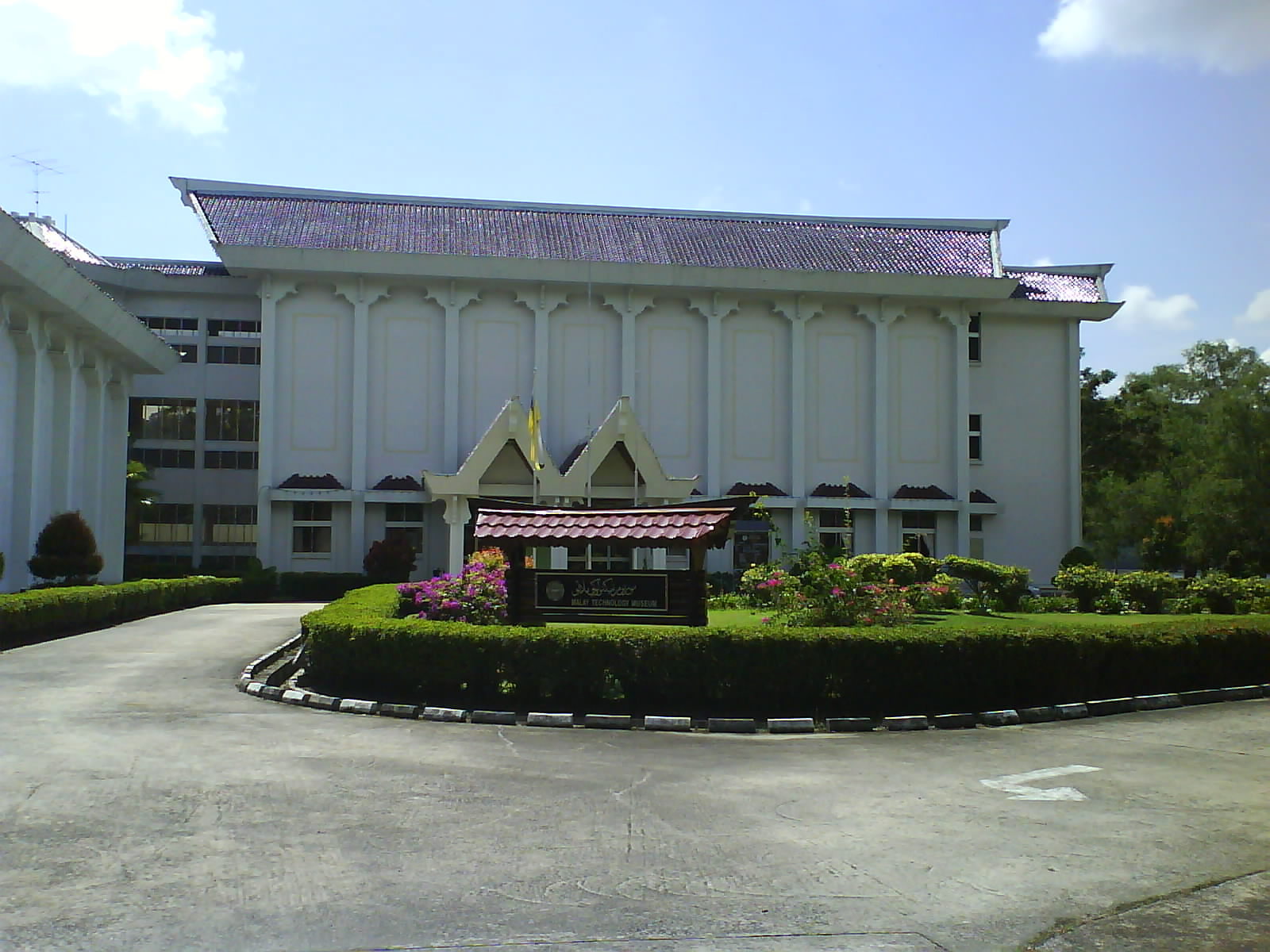
- The museum in 2009
- Established: 29 February 1988
- Location: Simpang 482, Kota Batu, Bandar Seri Begawan, Brunei
- Coordinates: 4°52′59″N 114°58′12″E
- Type: Ethnographic and technology museum
- Collections: Cultural tools and traditional technologies
- Visitors: 14,893 (2020)
- Founder: Sultan Hassanal Bolkiah
- Owner: Government of Brunei
- Parking: On site (no charge)
- Website: www.museums.gov.bn

The Malay Technology Museum (Malay: Muzium Teknologi Melayu) is a museum in Kota Batu of Bandar Seri Begawan, Brunei. The museum's main objective is to present early Brunei's technical practices, which provide insight into the way of life of the country's inhabitants, who lived in both the water town and on dry ground.

== Location ==
The Malay Technology Museum is located in Kota Batu, along Jalan Kota Batu, close to other important historical landmarks including the Tombs of Sultan Sharif Ali, the third sultan, and Sultan Bolkiah, the fifth sultan. Situated on the river delta and slopes of the Brunei River, the museum is a part of a complex of museums that also includes the Brunei Museum and the Brunei Darussalam Maritime Museum.

== History ==
Sultan Hassanal Bolkiah gave the Malay Technology Museum its formal opening on 29 February 1988. The Royal Dutch Shell Group of Companies funded the museum's construction, which came at a cost of about B$7 million. Building took place on a 15 hectares (37 acres) area of land along the Brunei River at Kota Batu between 1985 and 1987.

== Exhibit and galleries ==
The museum's collection of artefacts offers a documentation of cultural tools that Bruneians previously often used, many of which are now antiquated. Three primary display halls of the museum are devoted to the subjects of inland traditional technology, water village traditional houses, and water village traditional technology.

The ASEAN Youth Sculptures and an interactive area with classic games are also on display in the museum. Exhibited pieces include the General Hospital's front gate, which was first inaugurated on 7 September 1929. The gate has been kept as a historical monument even though the General Hospital was eventually replaced in 1984 by the Raja Isteri Pengiran Anak Saleha Hospital.

The museum has three galleries:

=== Hall Number 1: Water Village Traditional House Gallery ===
The first gallery showcases architectural styles from the late 19th to early 20th centuries. Six model houses, made from traditional materials such as daun apong, kajang, and bamboo, represent different socioeconomic ranks. Key designs include the commoners' Rumah Belah Bubung, the nobility's Rumah Tungkup and Rumah Loteng, as well as later designs like the zinc-roofed Rumah Potong Lima and the collided-roofed Rumah Belanggar.

=== Hall Number 2: Water Village Traditional Technology ===
The second gallery features a variety of handicrafts and businesses from the water town, such as textile weaving, gold and silversmithing, boat building, and roof construction. Along with showcasing local artworks like brass trays, ancient pots, and woven fabric, the display also emphasises traditional jobs and equipment. Some village names, such Kampong Pandai Besi, are derived from ironsmithing-related professions.

=== Hall Number 3: Inland Traditional Technology Gallery ===
The third gallery features native technology from these communities, such as the tools used to make ambulong, tapa garut, and gulanau, in addition to particular cultural objects including rafts, musical instruments, and sugar cane pressing apparatuses. The exhibition also showcases replicas of traditional houses, such as the Kedayan house, which is used for extended family life, the Dusun house, which has bedrooms indicating family hierarchy, and the Murut house, which has a communal area and Barukai ceremonial space.

== Gallery ==
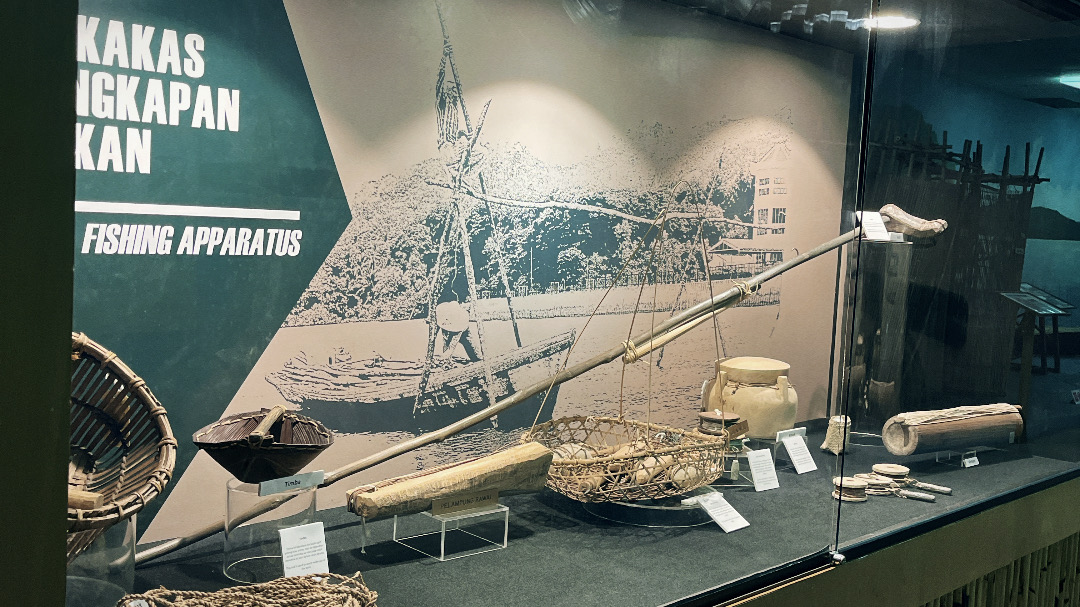
Water Village Traditional Technology

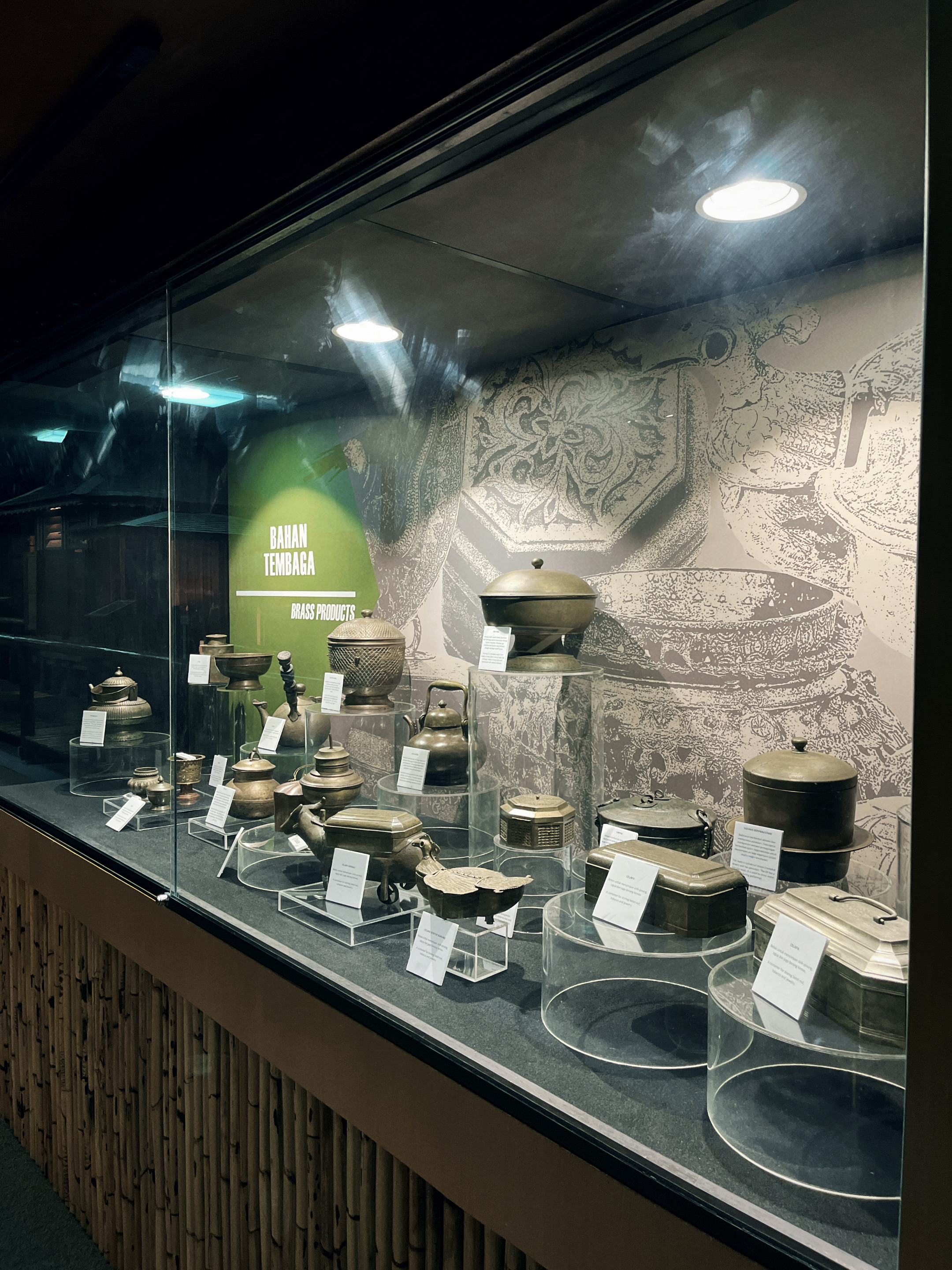
Water Village Traditional Technology

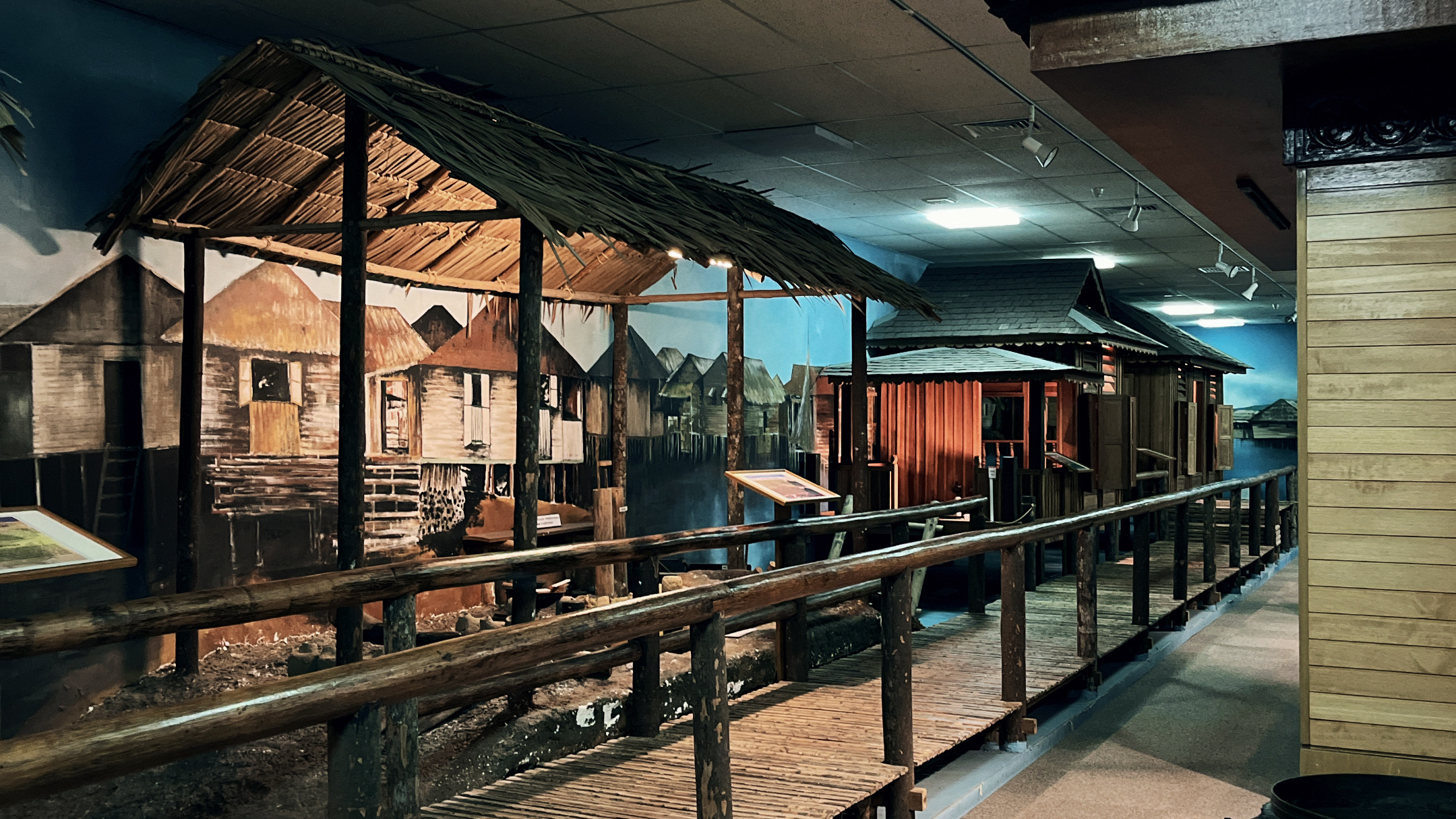
Water Village Traditional House Gallery

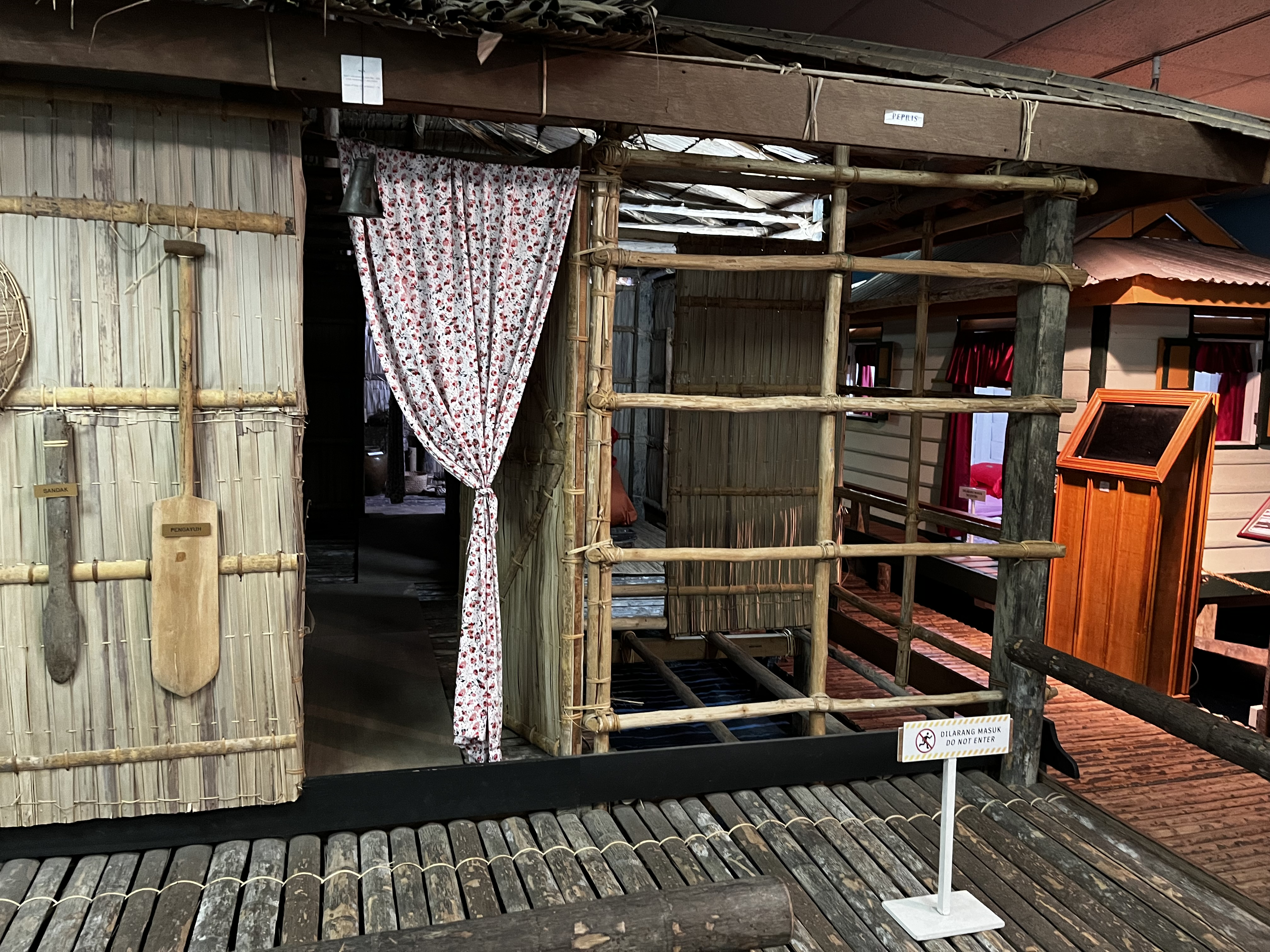
Water Village Traditional House Gallery

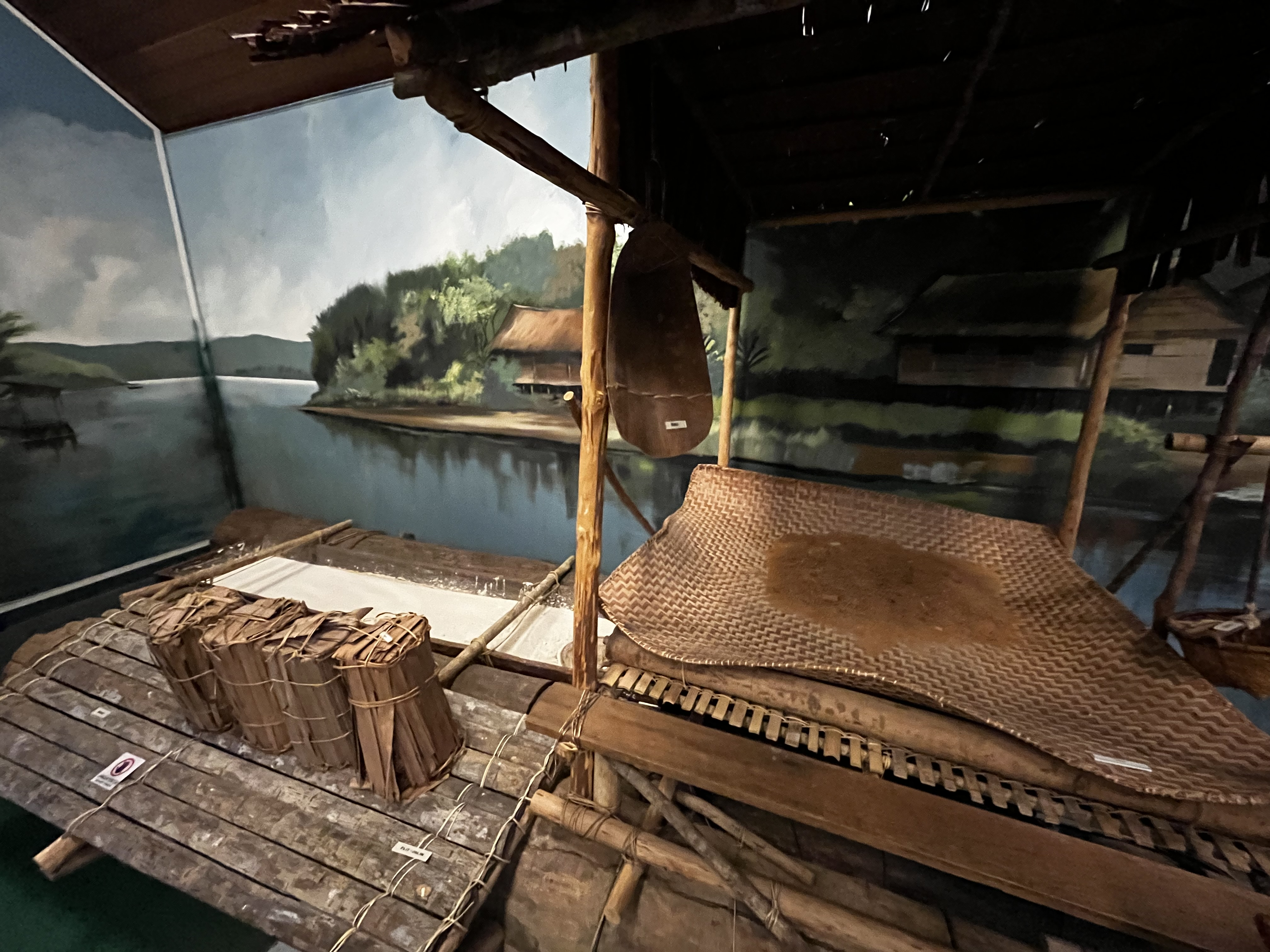
Inland Traditional Technology Gallery

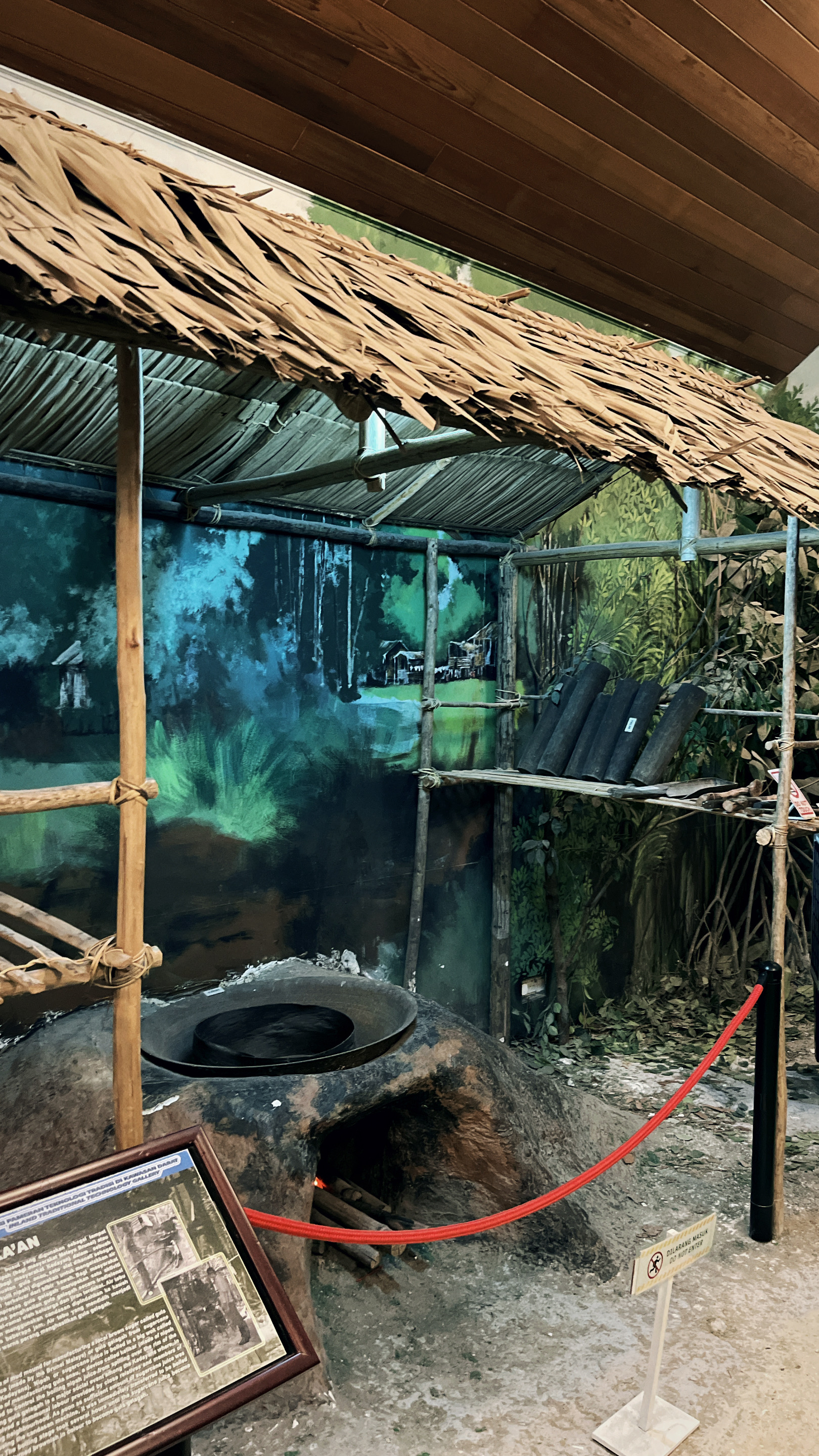
Inland Traditional Technology Gallery

== See also ==
- List of museums in Brunei
