= Champion oil field =

Offshore oil field in Brunei

Champion
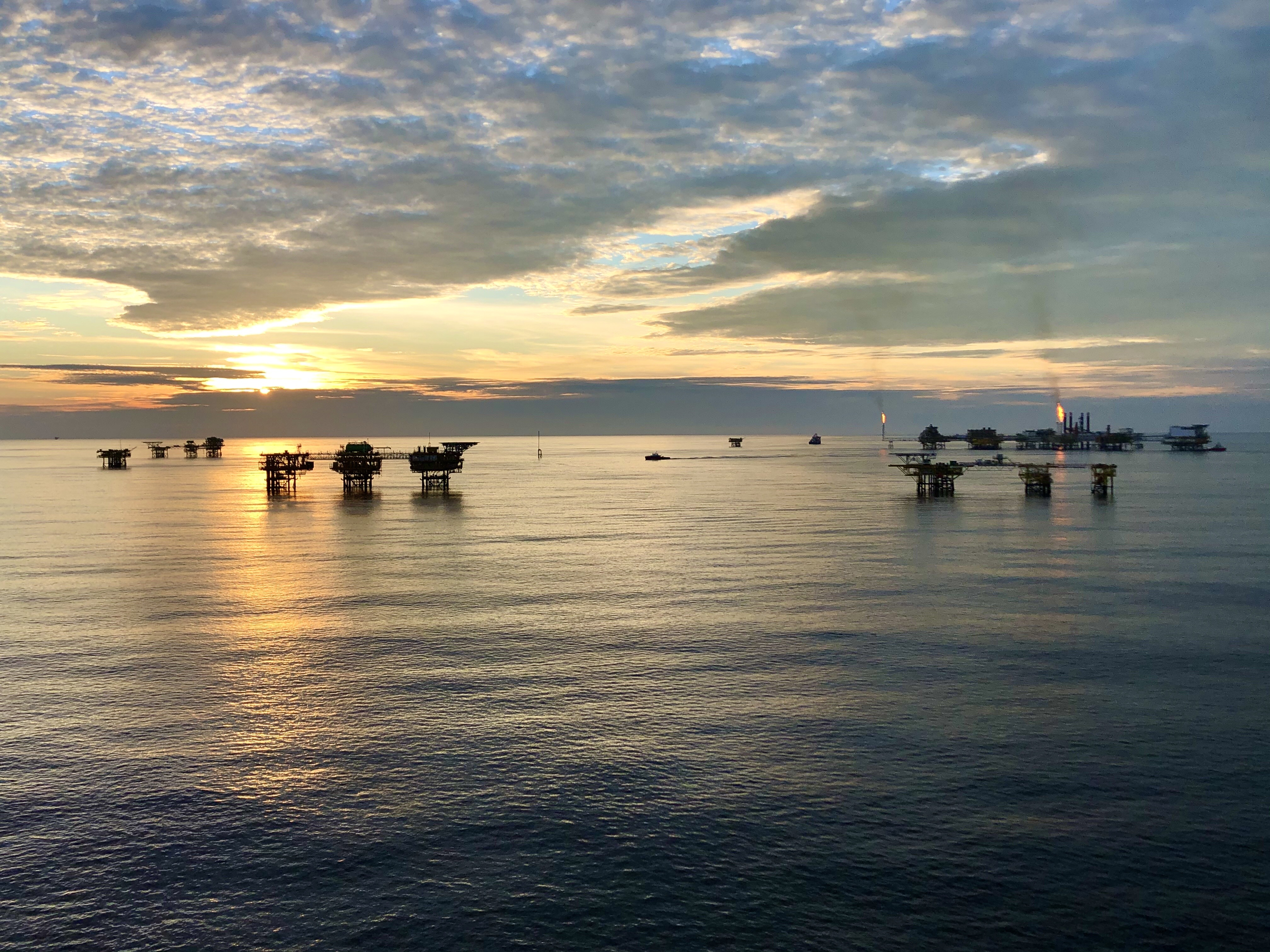
- Champion oil field in 2020

- Location within Borneo
- Country: Brunei
- Region: Brunei-Muara
- Offshore/onshore: Offshore
- Coordinates: 5.2100°N 114.7419°E
- Operators: Brunei Shell Petroleum
- Owner: Brunei Shell Petroleum (50%); Government of Brunei (50%)
- Service contractors: JDR; HHI: Champion 7; Emtunga: Champion 7; McDermott: Champion B2/3

Field history
- Discovery: 1970
- Start of production: 1972
- Peak of production: 2006

Champion oil field also known as Champion Field is a complex oil and gas field, situated 40 kilometres (25 mi) north-northwest of Bandar Seri Begawan, in shallow water depths of 10 to 45 metres. The Brunei Shell Petroleum (BSP), which is jointly owned by Shell and the Bruneian government, is the owner and operator of the offshore field. The shallow part of the field is covered by coral reefs.

== History ==
=== 1970s ===
Champion field was discovered in 1970 by Champion-1 which is drilled in its most northern part. first oil platform was completed in 1972, to produce from shallow, oil-bearing intervals. 1974, a blow-out at Champion-41 caused a delay in the appraisal/development operations and to compensate for this delay, eight isolated appraisal wells were drilled in 1975 - 1976.

The Champion West field was discovered in 1975 by well CW-1 and it is located approximately 7 km north-northwest of the Champion Main field and 15 km northeast of Iron Duke. The depth of Champion West's area is approximately 40 m.

A blow-out occurred in the northern part of the main Champion field in well CP-141, in early 1979. A grid concept for platform location was introduced for the shallow part of the main field in 1978 which consists of the bulk of the known oil reserves to ensure most of the future draining are within easy reach of a platform location.

=== 1980s-1990s ===
Construction of the centralised field facilities at Champion-7 began in 1980 until 1983. It has living accommodations, gaslift and compression capabilities, water treatment and injection facilities, and operation management for the field.

As of 1996, 282 wells have been drilled, of which 118 are producing. The Peragam field lies directly below the producing Champion field and it was discovered by the Peragam-1 exploration well in 1990, Kasmadi Kaling and O'Rourke in 1993. Peragam-1 discovery was CW-8, drilled in early 1992 from the Champion West well jacket CWWJ-2 to test the oil and gas development of the shallower reservoirs. In 1996, it had a production rate of 1.5 million m^{3}/day of gas from PGM-2.

=== 2000s-2010s ===
In 2006, Brunei reached its peak of production with 220,000 b/d to become the third largest producer of oil and gas in Asia but the depletion of the fields generated the decline of production down to 141,000 b/d in 2012. With peak production, the oil field recovered 84.27% of its total recoverable reserves. Production would go on until the field hits its economic limit in 2060, according to economic projections. In 2012, the Waterflood Project produced its first oil. Twenty wells, including production and water injection wells, were drilled during the project's A1 phase.

Early in 2013, the drilling platform CPDP 37 underwent an upgrade that made it possible for the A2 phase to begin producing oil in May of the same year. As part of an expansion, Siemens installed a new 1,000 tonnes (980 long tons; 1,100 short tons) power generation module featuring two gas turbine generator units, ancillary facilities, a control system and a dedicated electrical system were installed on the Champion-7 Exploration Platform in July 2013. On the new Champion-7 Living Quarters (CPNQ-7) platform, a fuel gas conditioning skid (FGCS) system and an emergency diesel generator (EDG) were also fitted in the same year.

As of November 2023, the field produces around 26% of the nation's daily output.

== Levels ==
It is divided into 5 levels because of the level of thickness.

Numbers	Levels	Distance	Horizons
1	Very Shallow	600metres	H1.0 and shallower
2	Shallow	600 to 1,500 metres	H1.0 - P1.0 horizons
3	Intermediate	1,500 to 2,150 metres	P1.0 - S1.0 horizons
4	Deep	2,150 metres to the top of the hard overpressures	S1.0 - V1.0 horizons
5	Ultra Deep	hard overpressured section	V1.0 - V4.0 horizons

== Platforms ==
By 2015, the platforms CPPP01, CPRP01, CPDP33, CPPP04, CPRP04, and CPDP31 will be dismantled and rebuilt. 2013 saw the successful installation of a new vent knockout drum for CPRP01 and a new separator for CPPP01. The field is well-established, with more than 250 active wells.

- Champion-1
- Champion-7 (Main Complex Platform)
- Champion-11
- Champion-41
- Champion-37
- Champion-38
- Champion-39

== Gallery ==
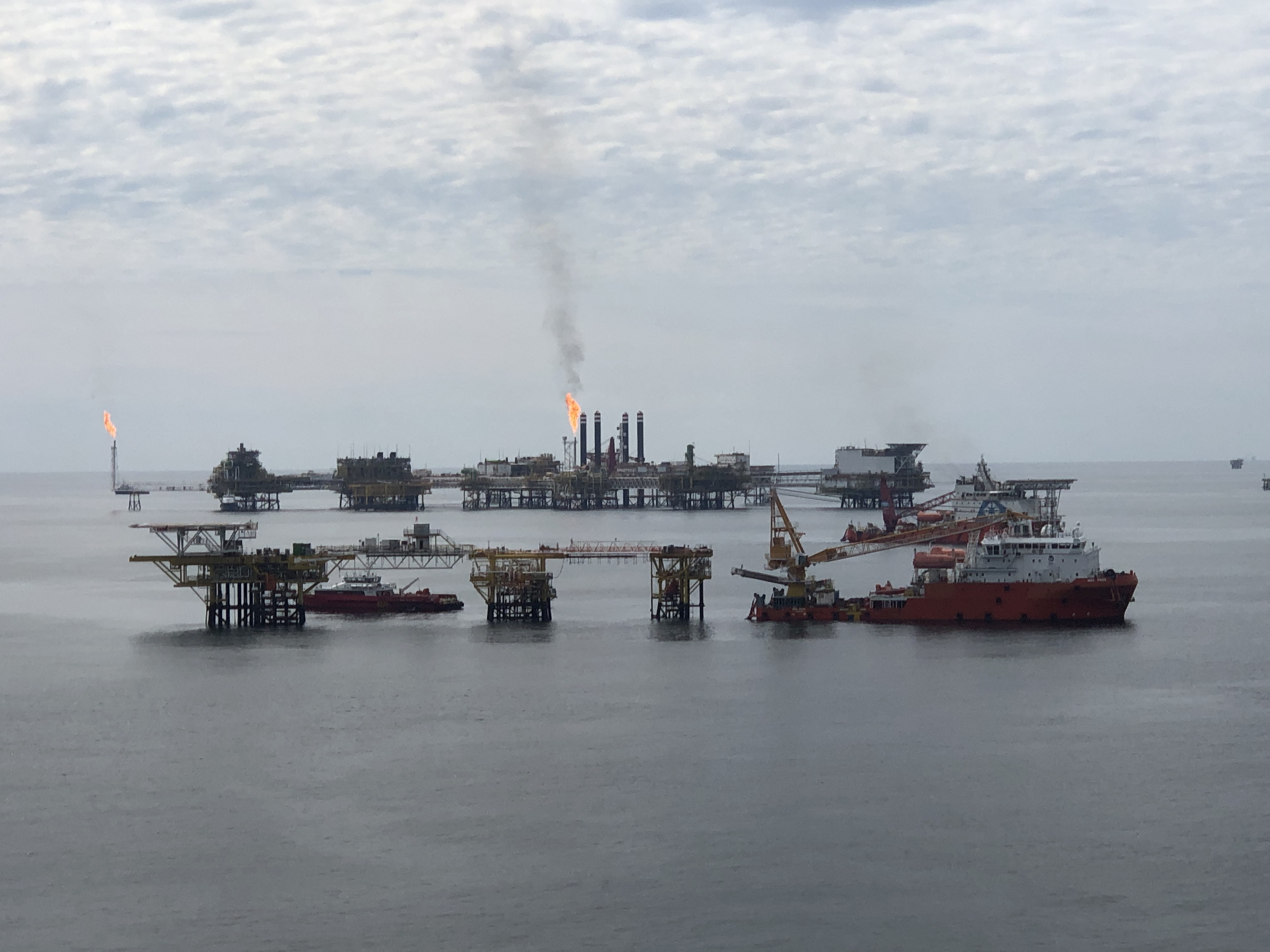
Champion 7 on 3 August 2020

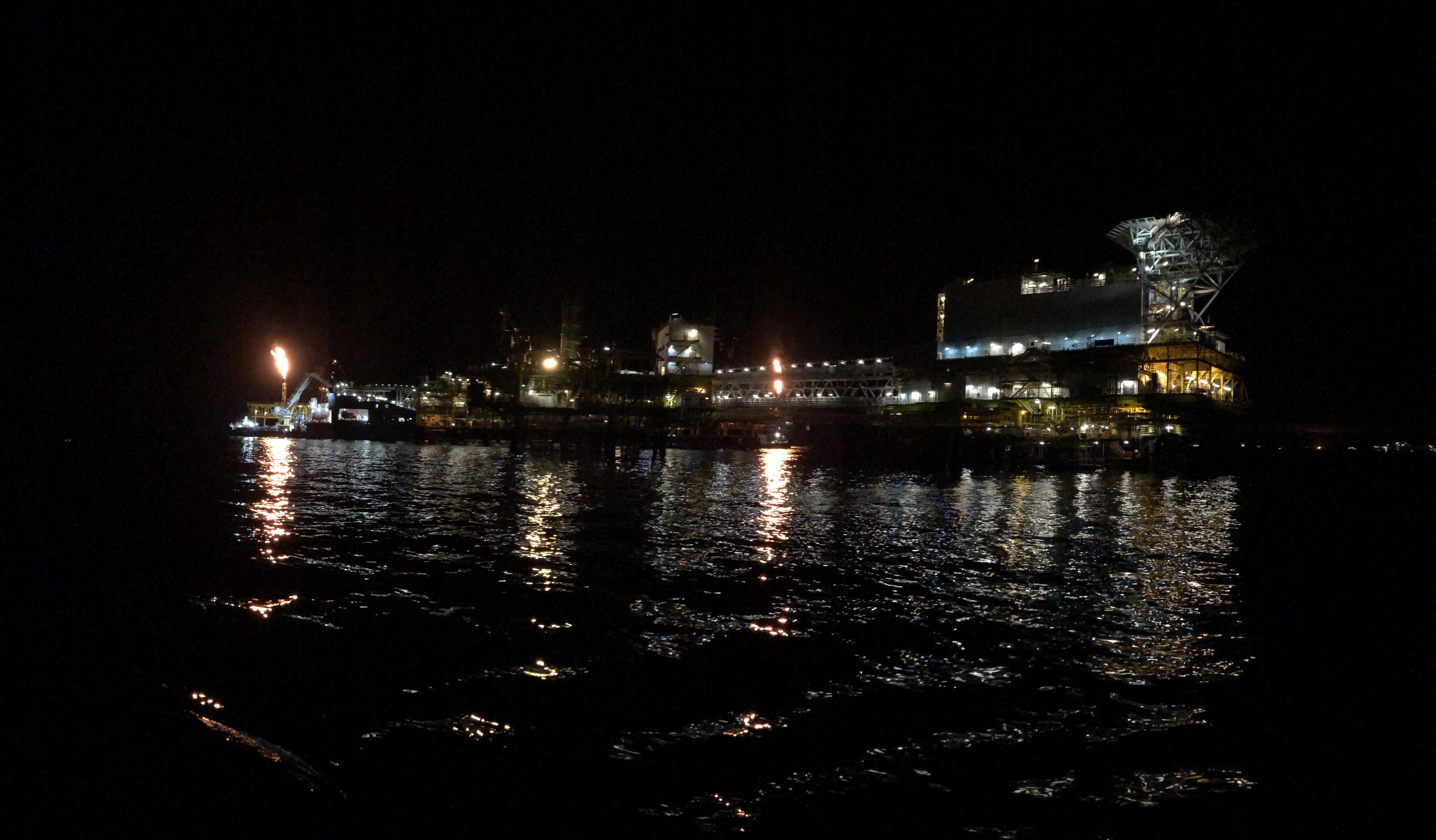
At night on 9 September 2020
