= Sultan Hassanal Bolkiah Highway =

Highway in Brunei

Coordinates: 4.9357308°N 114.9312776°E

Sultan Hassanal Bolkiah Highway

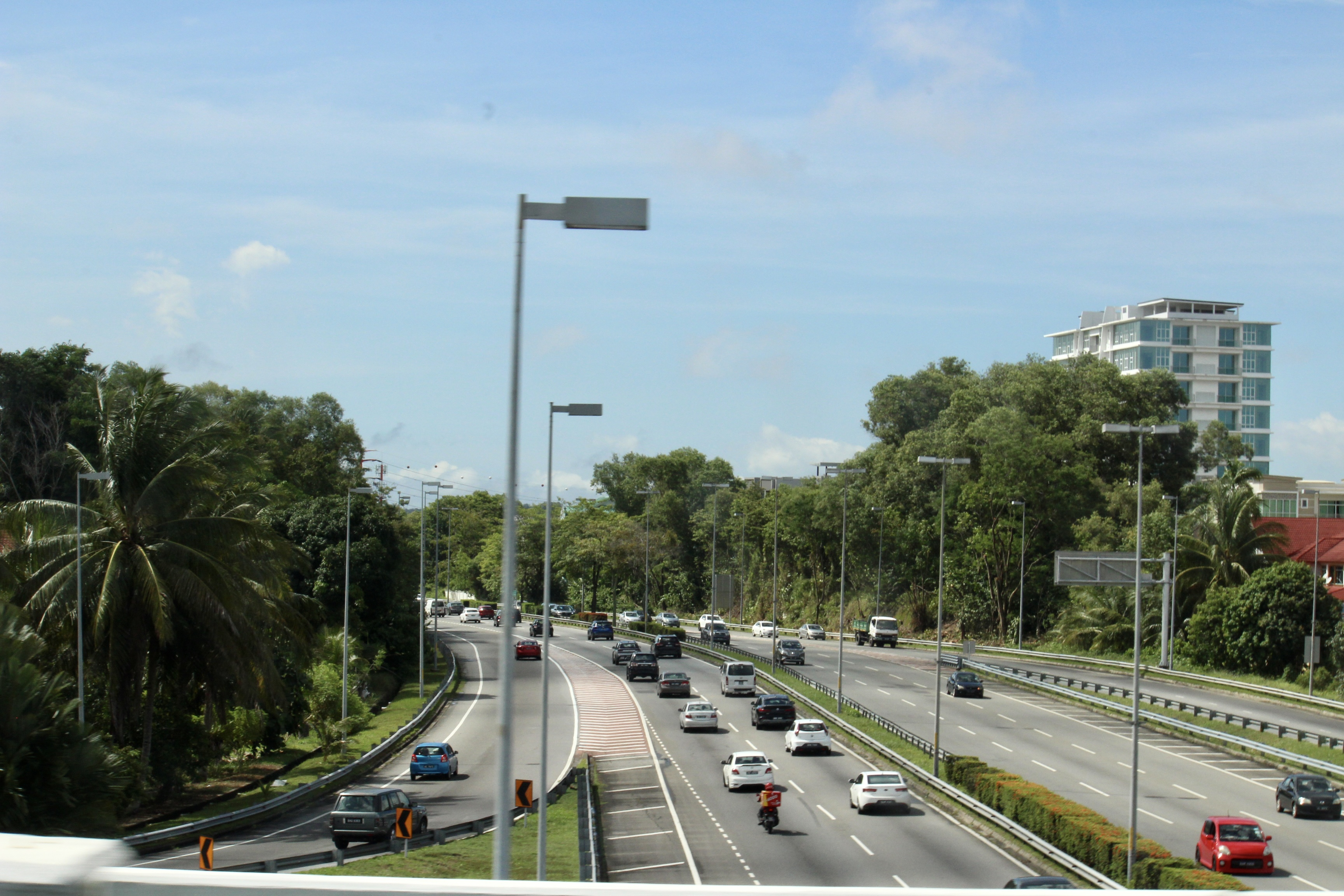

Route information
- Length: 7.7 km (4.8 mi)
- Existed: 18 August 1986–present

Major junctions
- Southeast end: Batu Satu
- Tungku Highway
- Northeast end: Brunei International Airport

Location
- Country: Brunei
- Major cities: Bandar Seri Begawan

Highway system
- Brunei National Roads System

Sultan Hassanal Bolkiah Highway (Malay: Lebuhraya Sultan Hassanal Bolkiah; Jawi: لبوهراي سلطان حسن البلقيه) is a major controlled-access highway in Bandar Seri Begawan, Brunei. The highway runs for 7.7 kilometres, forming a bypass around the urban core of Bandar Seri Begawan, along with Jalan Sungai Akar which completes the bypass on the eastern side of the city.

== History ==
Sultan Hassanal Bolkiah officially opened the Sultan Hassanal Bolkiah Highway on Monday, 18 August 1986. The massive project, which was built at a cost of about B$40 million, was designed to lessen traffic congestion at the time. This expressway, which is around 7.7 kilometres (4.8 mi) long, was built from Seri Kompleks in Batu Satu, Jalan Tutong past Kampong Kiulap and Gadong, and then towards Brunei International Airport.

== Route background ==
Kilometre 0 of the highway starts at Jalan Raja Isteri Pengiran Anak Saleha, two kilometres away from the capital centre, Bandar Seri Begawan, next to the commercial area of Batu Satu. The highway starts from the junction southeast and then makes a sharp bend to continue northwest. The highway passes by the Raja Isteri Pengiran Anak Saleha Hospital, Kiulap, and Kiarong. At the Kiarong Roundabout, the highway goes through the roundabout via an underpass and makes a turn north. The highway flies over Jalan Gadong and passes by the commercial area of Gadong. Further along is where Tungku Highway begins its route, starting westwards. The highway makes a smooth curve northeast, then passes by the Brunei International Airport. Then, it flies over Jalan Utama Berakas and passes by settlements of Lambak and Madang. The highway sharply turns southeast and ends at the Sungai Tilong-Sungai Akar-Manggis-Serusop Roundabout at Sungai Akar. The road then continues as Jalan Sungai Akar towards Land Transport Department Headquarters.

=== Speed Limit ===
The speed limit for this highway is 80 kilometres per hour (km/h) for typical road conditions. During wet road conditions, the speed limit is 65 km/h. Exceptions to this rule are:

- 50 km/h on all ramps along the highway.
- 65 km/h on kilometre 0 to kilometer 0.5 due to a sharp bend.

== Junction list ==
Intersection names are conjectural and unofficial.

Concurrency terminus Closed/Former Incomplete access Unopened

- I/C - interchange, I/S - intersection

County	Location	KM	Intersection	Destinations	Remarks
Gadong	Seri	0	Seri Batu Satu Park I/S	Jalan Tutong: Seri, Raja Isteri Pengiran Anak Saleha Hospital, Parit, Tumasek, Kumbang Pasang, Bandar Seri Begawan, Kianggeh	Has traffic lights
Gadong	Seri		Seri I/S	Jalan Laksamana Abdul Razak: Seri, Royal Cemetery	Northwest-bound only
Gadong	Seri		RIPAS I/C	Jalan Putera Al-Muhtadee Billah: Raja Isteri Pengiran Anak Saleha Hospital, Kiulap	Southeast-bound only
Gadong	Kiarong		Kiarong I/C	Kiarong Roundabout: Jalan Jame'Asr: Kiarong, Beribi, Beribi Industrial Estate, Kiulap, Kumbang Pasang; Jalan Pasar Baru: Gadong Wet Market, Gadong	
Gadong	Menglait		Sungai Gadong bridge		
Gadong	Menglait		Gadong I/C	Jalan Gadong: Gadong, Batu Bersurat, Mata-Mata, Menglait, Kumbang Pasang	
Gadong	Menglait		Menglait I/C	Tungku Highway: Batu Bersurat, Rimba, Tungku, Muara, Tutong, Kuala Belait	
Berakas	Jaya Bakti		Ulu Berakas I/C	Jalan Menteri Besar: Brunei Government Complexes, Kumbang Pasang, Mentiri	
Berakas	Anggerek Desa		Airport I/C	Airport Roundabout: Airport Circle: Brunei International Airport; Jalan Kustin: Terunjing Lama; Jalan Muara: Serusop, Anggerek Desa, Lambak, Pulaie	
Berakas	Madang		Lambak Kanan I/C	Jalan Kustin (northeast-bound exit only): Terunjing Lama; Jalan Berakas (northeast-bound exit only): Lambak, Terunjing, Madang, Manggis, Muara, Tutong, Kuala Belait; Jalan Berakas (southwest-bound exit only): Brunei International Airport, Serusop, Anggerek Desa, Pulaie	
Berakas	Manggis		Manggis I/S	Jalan Manggis Satu (northeast-bound exit only): Madang, Manggis, Sungai Tilong; Jalan Manggis Satu (southwest-bound exit only): Serusop, Pulaie, Anggerek Desa	
Berakas	Sungai Akar		Sungai Akar I/C	Central Berakas Roundabout: Jalan Manggis Dua: Manggis, Madang; Jalan Muara: Serusop, Pulaie, Sungai Tilong, Salambigar, Tanah Jambu, Kota Batu, Mentiri, Muara	
Continues as Jalan Sungai Akar
