= Kampong Kiulap =

Village in Brunei-Muara, Brunei

Kampong Kiulap Kampung Kiulap
- Village and neighbourhood
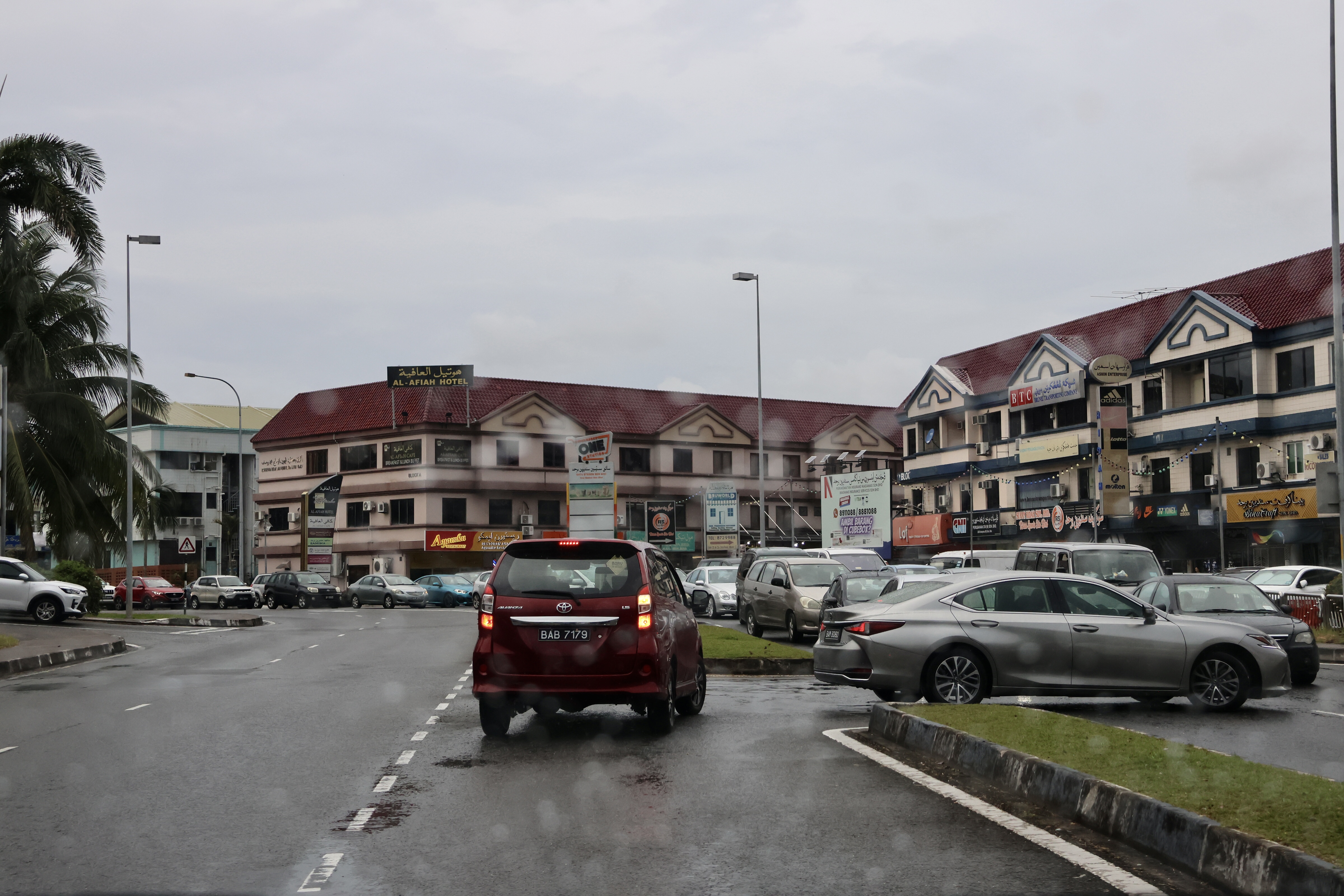
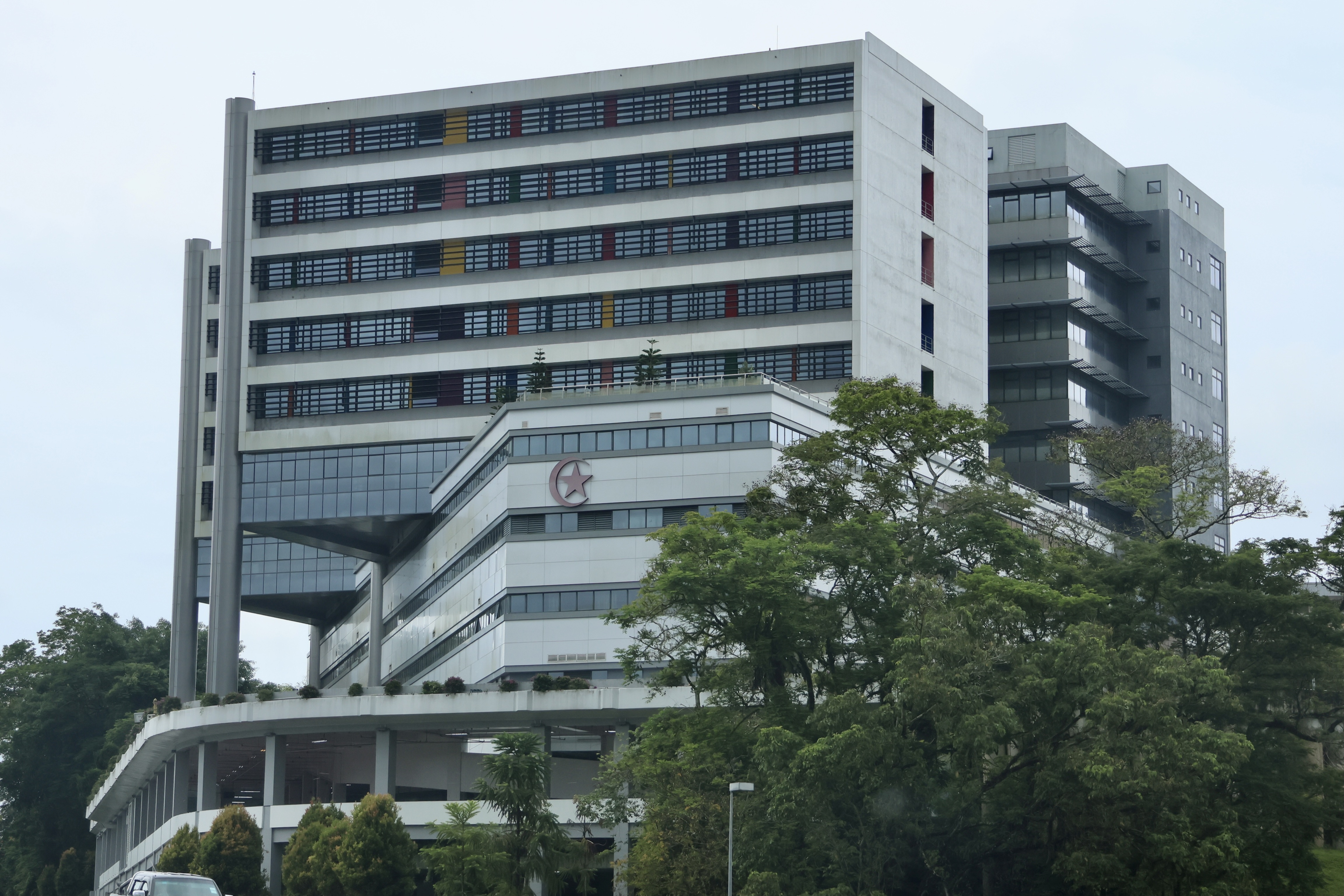
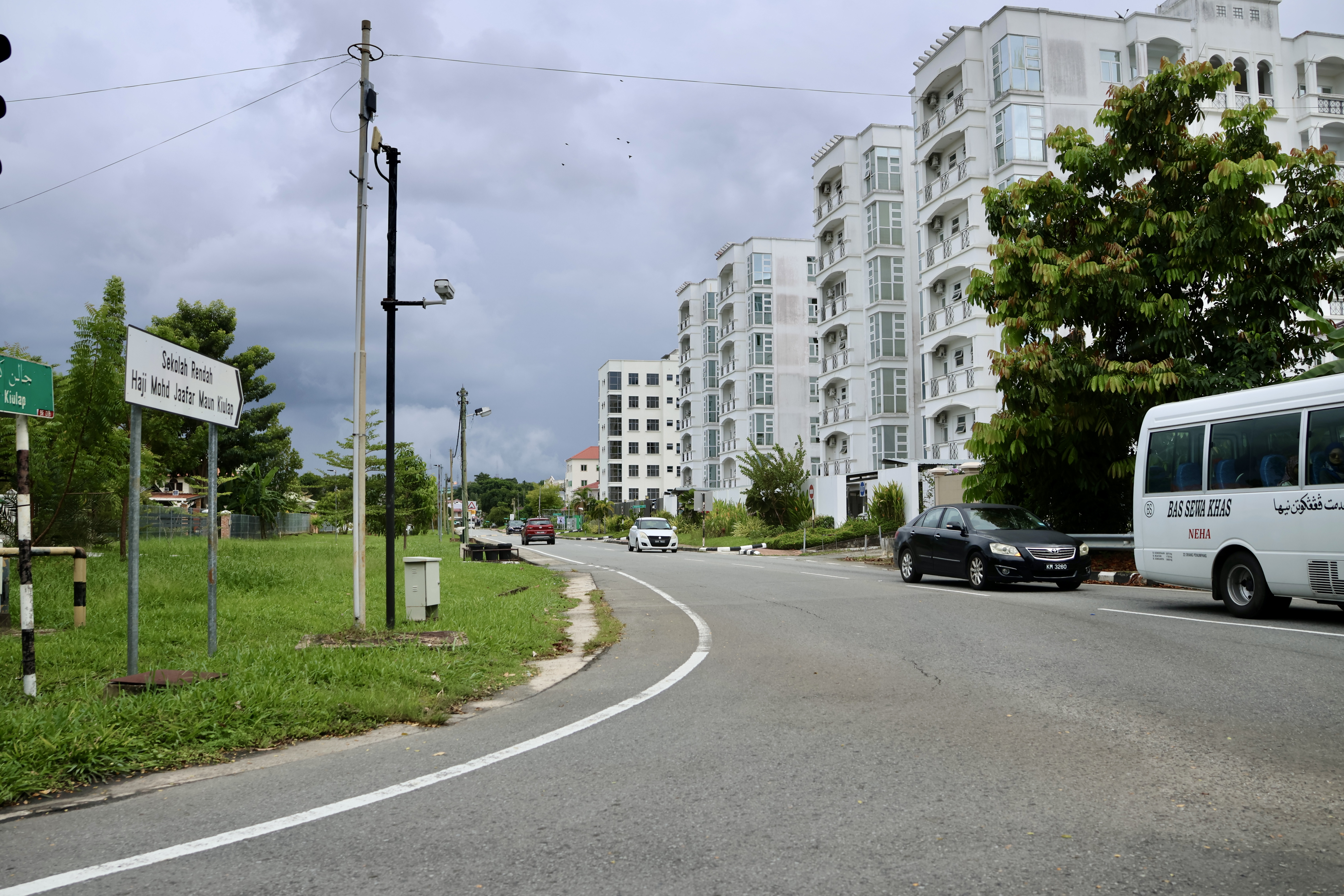
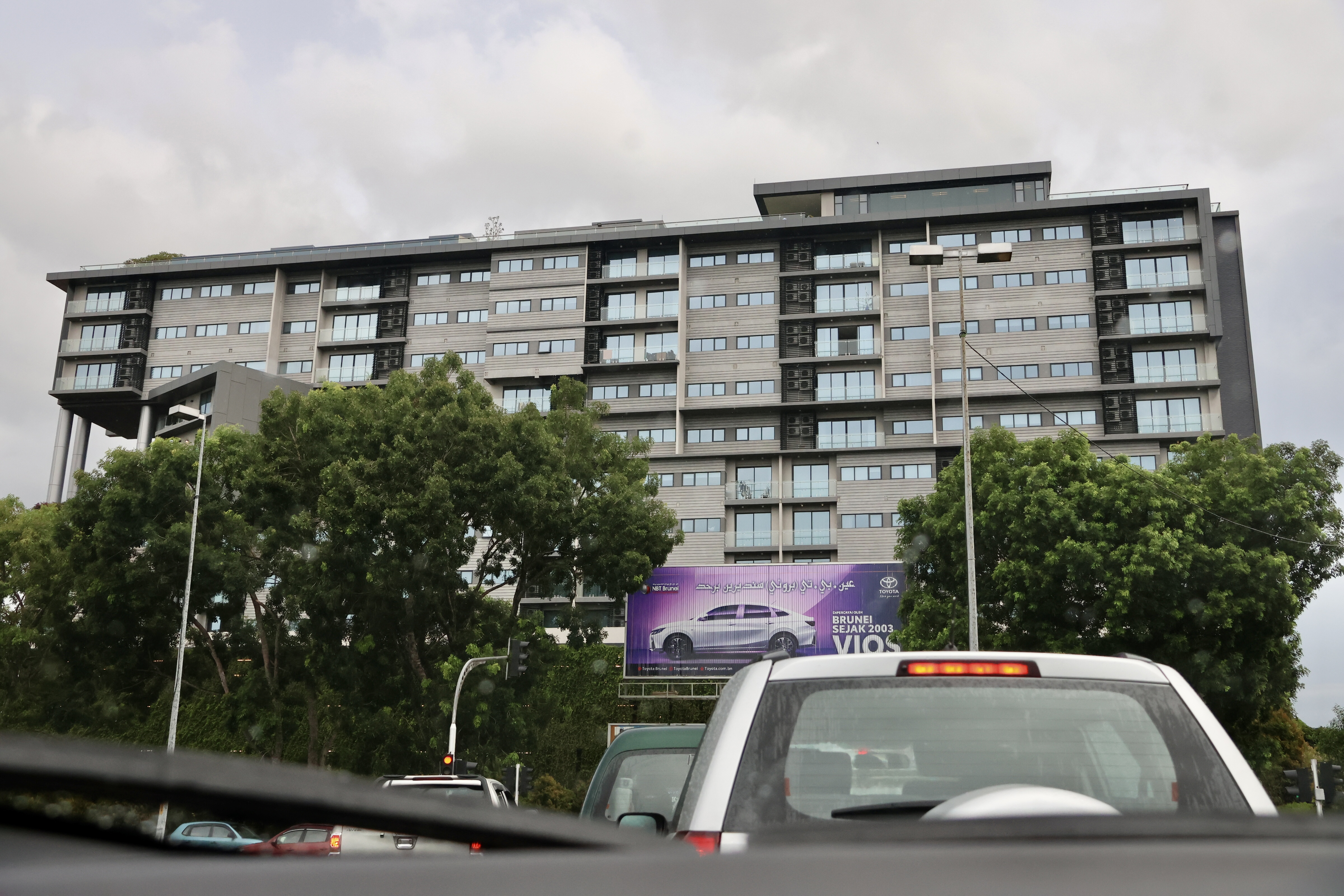
- Clockwise from top left: Jalan Komersial Kiulap, RIPAS Hospital, condominium, Jalan Kiulap

- Location in Brunei
- Coordinates: 4°53′48″N 114°55′41″E
- Country: Brunei
- District: Brunei–Muara
- Mukim: Gadong 'B'

Government
  - Village head: Hassan Mohammad

Area
  - Total: 176.53 ha (436.2 acres)

Population (2021)
  - Total: 3,663
  - Density: 2,075/km^{2} (5,374/sq mi)
- Time zone: UTC+8 (BNT)
- Postcode: BE1518

Kampong Kiulap (Malay: Kampung Kiulap) or commonly known as Kiulap, is a village in Brunei–Muara District, Brunei, as well as a neighbourhood and commercial area in the capital Bandar Seri Begawan. It has an area of 176.53 hectares (436.2 acres); the population was 3,400 in 2016. It is one of the villages within Mukim Gadong 'B'. The postcode is BE1518.

== Etymology ==
The village originally has no name. However, the name Kampong Kiulap comes from the name Sulap (junjung or small house usually made in the rice fields or in the garden used as a resting place). Individuals travel there to farm from Tamoi, Lurong Dalam, Sungai Kedayan, and even Kumbang Pasang, Pintu Malim, and Kota Batu. Black pepper, paddy, gambir, and tobacco leaves are among the agricultural products. There were still sirih and gambir planted in the 1950s and 60s.

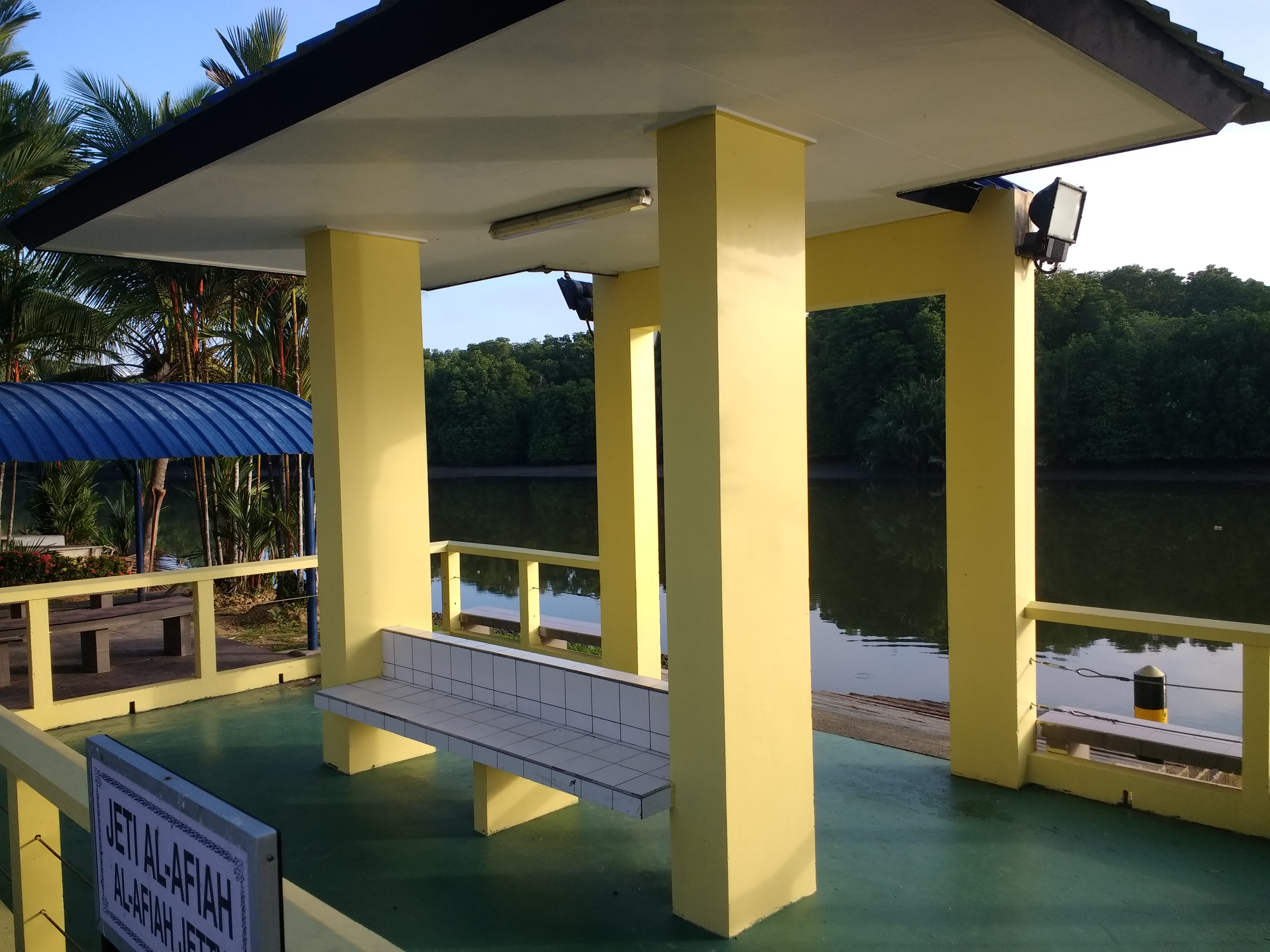
Al-Afiah Jetty on the Kedayan River in Kiulap

== Geography ==
Kiulap is located in the heart of Bandar Seri Begawan, close to the Pusat Bandar as well as Gadong, another commercial area in the capital. It is also contiguous with Kiarong, another neighbourhood-cum-commercial area. The Kedayan River flows along the eastern part Kiulap, which also serves its border with Kumbang Pasang.

The construction of two parallel roads, namely the Sultan Hassanal Bolkiah Highway and Jalan Jame' Asr, have divided Kiulap into three sub-areas. Two of the portions comprise the neighbourhoods, where as the other part constitutes the commercial area; it is located in the northern part of Kiulap as well as near the Kedayan River.

== History ==
This village began to exist around the 1930s. During the Japanese occupation in the 40s, the Japanese built two of their offices in the village which caused the villagers to return to Kampong Lurong Dalam and they returned to the village after the end of the Japanese occupation in this country. In the early 60s, the residents of Kampong Kiulap were gathered together to buy wood in Lamunin to build the school wall. There are also villagers who bring double nails and saws to build the school. The school was built on waqf land and courtesy of the government covering an area of five acres with a leaf roof and a dirt floor. The first head teacher was Cikgu Suthi (of Dusun nationality).

== Administration ==
Apart from being a village subdivision, Kampong Kiarong has also been subsumed under the municipal area of the capital Bandar Seri Begawan.

== Economy ==
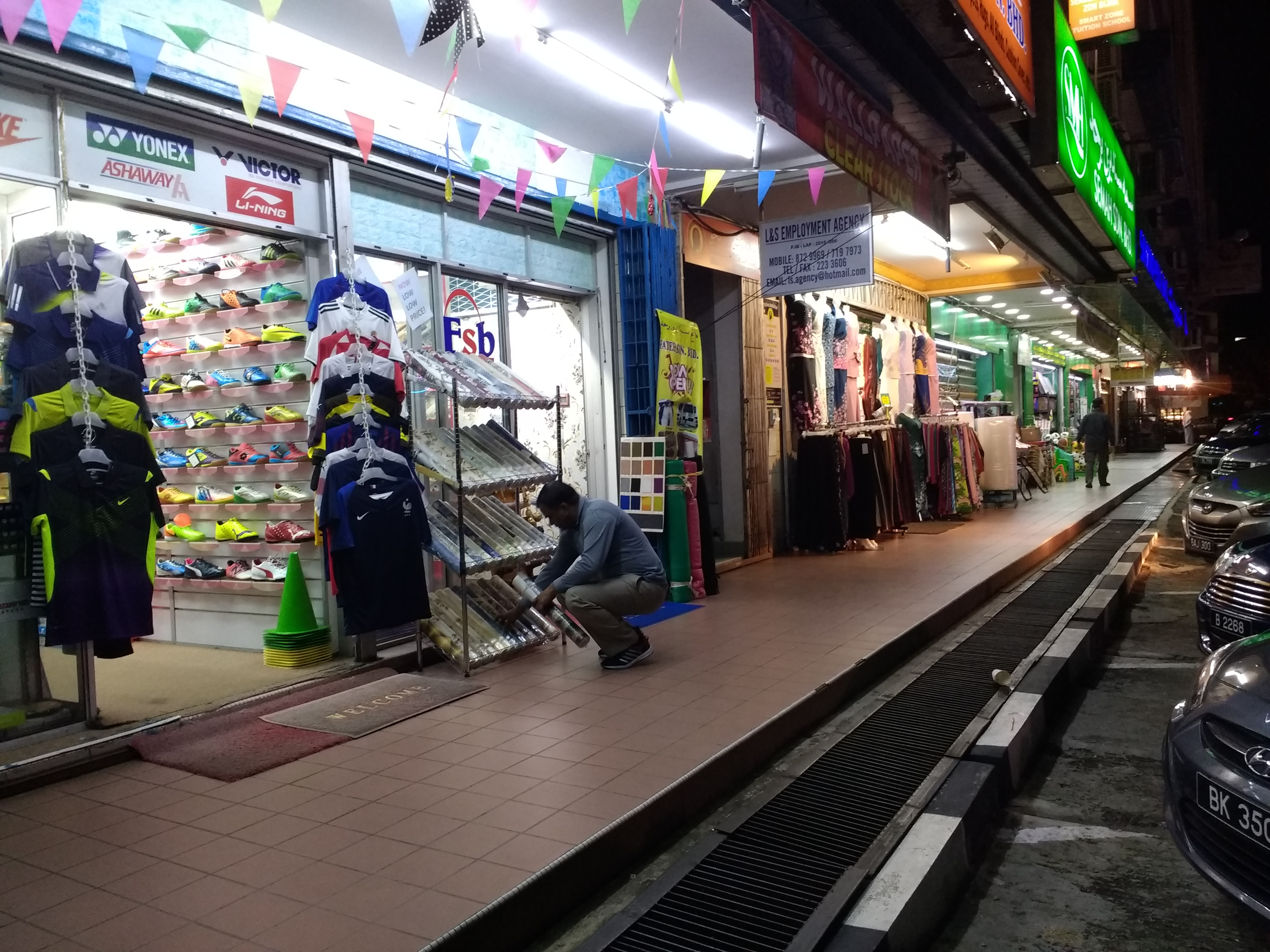
Shops in Kiulap

Kiulap is one of the few commercial areas in Bandar Seri Begawan. It mainly consists of complexes of shophouses which contain various types of businesses, most notably retail and eateries. There is a small shopping mall with a cineplex, a few hotels and offices. This village is also the focus of tourists since there are several business buildings and also hotels in this area.

The occupation of the people of Kampung Kiulap used to grow colorful gambir and betel flowers, white and pink, and has a very fragrant smell. There are two uses of the flowers, first for marriage and second for funeral. Most of the residents of Kampong Kiulap used to only work cutting rubber, especially for the residents of Kampong Saba and Kampong Sungai Kedayan who live in Kampong Kiulap. The rubber obtained is then sold to the Chinese. There are also those who only work in harvesting and harvesting rice. They lured by boat to Muara or Pulau Chermin by rowing.

== Transportation ==
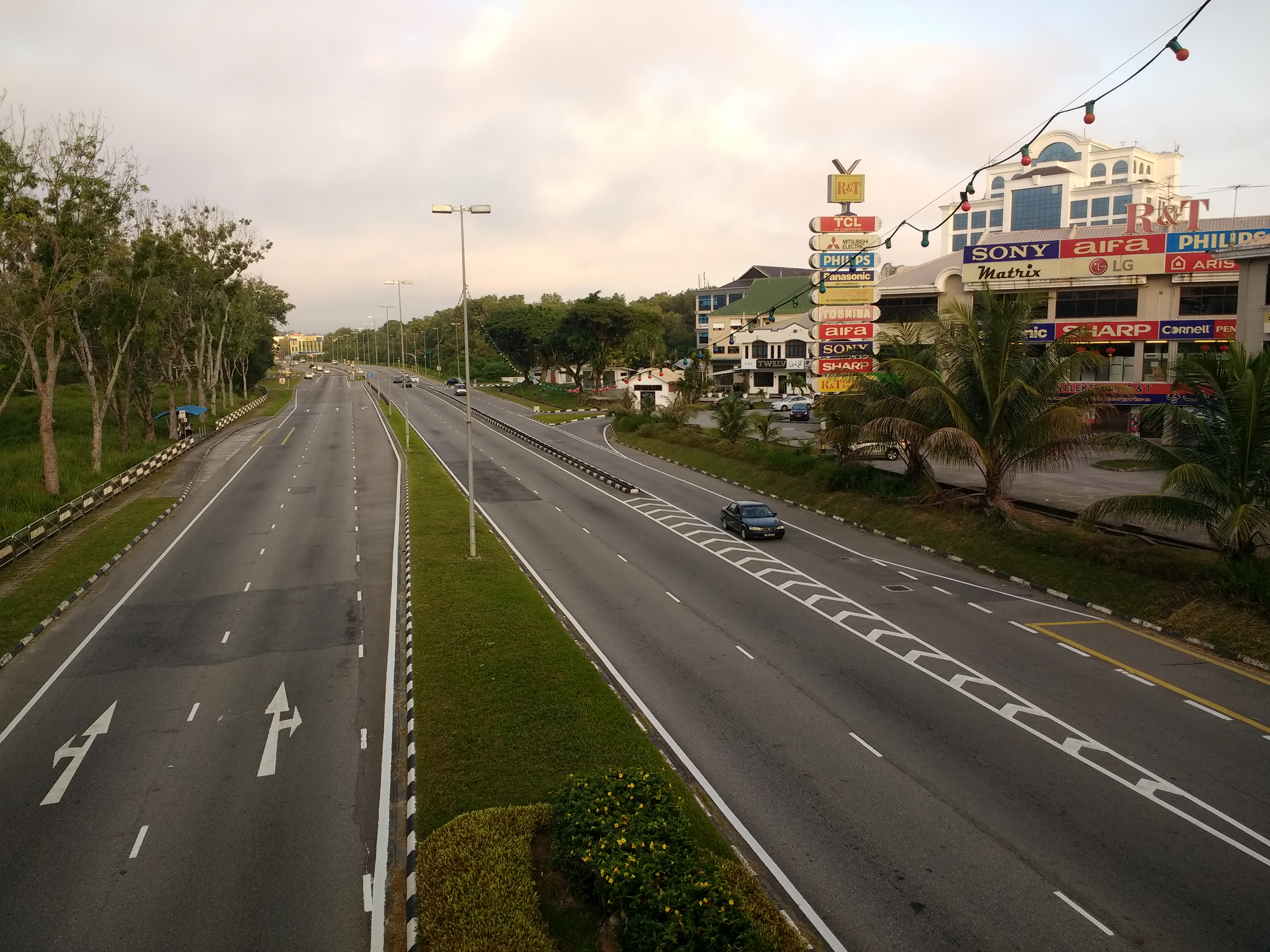
Jalan Jame' Asr in Kiulap

Two dual-carriageway, controlled-access highways traverse the Kiulap area. The Sultan Hassanal Bolkiah Highway and Jalan Jame' Asr run in parallel direction with each other in Kiulap but nevertheless converge at a roundabout junction in neighbouring Kiarong. The roads cause Kiulap to be separated into three portions. The central part which is a neighbourhood is served by Jalan Kiulap and is accessible to both roads, although indirectly via Simpang 127. The northern part is the commercial area and served by Jalan Komersial Kiulap which has direct access to Jalan Jame' Asr. The southern part, the other neighbourhood, is not accessible from within Kiulap, it is served by Jalan Kiarong, hence only accessible from Kiarong.

== Infrastructure ==
Like other villages, this village does not miss receiving some basic facilities such as electricity, water and telephone. Certainly the most prominent facility in this village is the Raja Isteri Pengiran Anak Saleha Hospital. In addition, there is also a primary school which is also used for religious school in the afternoon, the KACA Center, IGS School and Nusa Laila Puteri School. The village is also home to the Embassy of Japan.

The surau used to be located in an area called 'di laut' (the end of the rise near the current RIPAS Hospital area) to please the villagers, but the surau was only for obligatory prayers. The surau has a leaf roof and kajang walls, and the floor is made of two-inch-thick planed boards. While for Friday prayers they will pray at the mosque near Dang Ayang's grave (at that time there was no SOAS Mosque) by rowing.

=== Education ===
- There is a public primary school which serves the residents of Kiulap, namely Haji Mohammad Jaafar Maun Primary School. It also shares grounds with a religious school of the namesake, which provides the Ugama or Islamic religious primary education that is compulsory to Muslim pupils in the country.
- Kiulap is also home to the International Graduate Studies (IGS) College, one of the few private post-secondary institutions in the country.

== See also ==
- Kampong Kiarong
