= James Hatton Hall =

British planter and soldier (1866–1945)

- Born: 14 March 1866; Chorley, Lancashire, England
- Died: 27 March 1945 (aged 79); St Mary's Hospital, London, England
- Education: Blackburn Grammar School
- Occupations: Planter; soldier
- Military career
- Branch: British Army
- Service years: 1892–1899/1900
- Rank: Major
- Unit: 7th Lancashire (The Manchester Artillery)

James Hatton Hall (14 March 1866 – 27 March 1945) was a planter and soldier who played a pivotal role in the development of agriculture in Borneo. As the founder of "James Hatton Hall and Company," he operated a general merchant business and proudly referred to himself as "a pioneer in Brunei and North Borneo." His journey into chartered company territory began at the turn of the 20th century, leading to his long tenure as the manager of the expansive 8,000-acre (3,200 ha) Woodford Estate in Beaufort, situated along the Padas River. In 1910, Hall established a private estate at Berakas in neighbouring Brunei, fully dedicating himself to its development after departing North Borneo in 1917, a year marked by significant global upheaval, including the Russian Revolution.

== Early life ==
James Hatton Hall was born on 14 March 1866 in Chorley, Lancashire, and received his education at Blackburn Grammar School. After spending several years abroad, he began his trading career in 1889. By 1896, he had been elected to the Manchester Chamber of Commerce. His company, East India Merchants, James Hatton Hall and Company, operated from 34 Pall Mall in Manchester, and he also owned coffee and cocoa plantations in the West Indies during this period. His name appeared in the 1902 Manchester directory but was absent from the 1903 edition. Given his residence at the prestigious Reddish Hall in Lymm, Cheshire, it is evident that his ventures were financially successful.

He served in the military, beginning with his commission as a second lieutenant in the 7th Lancashire (The Manchester Artillery) Artillery Volunteers on 9 January 1892. He was promoted to lieutenant on 29 August 1894 and to captain, commanding the third battery, on 28 September 1897. His Army List entry included the note "p," indicating he was certified or otherwise qualified as proficient. Although listed as an honorary major from 1907 to 1909, Hall left the British Army around 1899–1900. (Note: "To qualify for the Volunteer Decoration, an individual needed to have served as an officer in the Volunteer Forces for twenty years, with time spent in the ranks counting as half," explained an expert at the National Army Museum in Chelsea. The expert expressed confusion over Hall's claim to possess the decoration, noting that he does not appear to have completed the required period of service.)

== Career ==
Hall began his career in Borneo as a general merchant, establishing his firm, James Hatton Hall and Company of Jesselton, in January 1903. At this point, he secured exclusive permission from the North Borneo government to import and export sigep bilai. However, the British North Borneo Company's court of directors ended this monopoly. In response, Sir Ernest Woodford Birch issued a notice prohibiting the sale of tobacco without a license, granting Hall the only license to do so. After securing the monopoly for importing tobacco into Brunei, where most of it was sold, Hall attempted to "corner" the market. Sultan Hashim Jalilul Alam Aqamaddin granted Hall the exclusive right to import and sell sigep bilai into Brunei for five years by a concession dated 4 April 1903, subject to an import fee of $12 per pikul.

Hall's concession, granted without payment, was extended in August 1904 for another 10 years, until 1 May 1918. The consideration for this extension was his pledge to pay import duties, which had previously been avoided through smuggling. Hall advanced approximately $3,000, part of which was paid at the time of the original grant, with the remainder paid upon the extension. However, in January 1904, complaints surfaced regarding the high cost of imported tobacco, which was burdening Labuan's lower classes. This brought the British government's attention to the negative impacts of Hall's dual monopoly. Edward Stubbs of the Colonial Office questioned Hall's involvement, suggesting that the monopoly had been previously granted to a Chinese monopolist who would have been more effective in curbing smuggling. Hall defended his position, attributing the high prices to increased import duties imposed in December 1903.

In the years that followed, Hall's company expanded with branches in Tenom, Sapong, Beaufort, Labuan, Brunei Town, and Lawas. The firm operated a sago plant and sawmills in Beaufort and became agents for a range of industries, including shipping, insurance, petroleum, wines, tobacco, and rubber. In 1904, Hall held two licenses in the Lawas district, one for the exclusive export of guano and bird nests and another for timber.

During this period, the rubber boom spread across the South China Sea, from Malaya to Borneo. Tapping began in Sekong in 1905, and several estates, particularly along the West Coast railway, were established by 1910. Hall returned to the United Kingdom on 14 August 1906, and his efforts bore fruit when the Beaufort Borneo Rubber Company, Limited was founded the following April. By 1909, £75,000 of the company's £100,000 nominal capital had been paid up, with the chartered company guaranteeing a 5% dividend for the first six years. The rubber fetched high prices on Mincing Lane, highlighting the estate's success under his management. Originally a tapioca plantation, Woodford Estate—or at least part of it—was named by Chee Swee Cheng, a Borneo revenue farmer who would later become a prominent Malayan banker and philanthropist, in honour of Birch. Between 1906 and 1907, around 240,000 rubber trees were planted across 150 acres at Woodford Estate.

Brunei United Plantations Limited (BUPL) was established after Hall secured the original concession in 1910. One of his more successful ventures was the Kumbang Pasang rubber estate, which he set up near Brunei Town in the same year. During his leave in the United Kingdom in 1910–1911, Hall arranged for an automobile to be imported for the estate, an event so notable that it made headlines in late 1912. Hall returned to England in May 1913 to recover from a malarial infection, but by October of the same year, he was back in Borneo. Additional plantings during this period included 570 acres in 1908, 220 acres in 1909, 575 acres in 1910, 35 acres in 1911, and 50 acres between 1912 and 1913. By April 1913, 45,000 trees were being tapped, producing 78,383 pounds of rubber between 1 May 1912 and 30 April 1913, with an additional 57,800 pounds harvested in the following six months.

Hall's strong reputation is reflected in his appointment as manager of the North Borneo State Rubber Company's 5,000-acre Lumat Estate in 1913, where he earned an annual salary of $400, along with a 2.5% commission. In the same year, on 21 February, he was elected chairman of the West Coast Planters Association. The company was chaired by Sir William Hood Treacher, with Price, Waterhouse and Company acting as auditors. Additionally, Hall played a key role in founding the Jesselton Ice and Power Company, incorporated in Singapore in November 1913. In collaboration with Cheng, Hall contributed to this and other ventures. Before the outbreak of World War I, the business was converted into a limited liability company, chaired by Birch, who was likely familiar with Hall. The company's registered office was based in Glasgow.

In March 1914, Hall's influence expanded further with his appointment to the North Borneo Legislative Council for a three-year term, a position that elevated his status and allowed him to engage with the nation's highest officials on equal terms. In November 1914, he declared his intention to build a general shophouse at Miri. He took a second period of home leave in 1916. When he left Beaufort in 1917, his "many West Coast friends" honoured him with a silver bowl to recognise his contributions.

On 16 May 1917, it was announced that Hall had moved to Brunei, where he planned to reorganise his private estate at Berakas and expand it by an additional 500 acres in partnership with Cheng. To support this venture, a syndicate called the Telok Gaya (Jesselton) Rubber Company was established to purchase a block of mature rubber land next to his plantation. By the end of 1917, the total area had grown to almost 1,000 acres. However, a second syndicate took over the operations of the first and further expanded the territory, ensuring continued growth. Meanwhile, while James Hatton Hall and Company of Jesselton remained successful, it was acquired by Harrisons & Crosfield (Borneo) Limited on 1 July 1918.

Hall made two unsuccessful attempts to purchase the Brooketon Colliery at Muara, near Brunei's capital, in 1920–1921 and again in 1937. The exact date of his final departure from Borneo remains unclear. However, on 2 January 1920, the British North Borneo Herald reported that "The total number of shares allotted to the BUPL is 114,000, of which 84,000 have been allotted as fully paid up in consideration of the transfer to the company of the undertaking and assets of Hall's Telok Gaya (Jesselton) Rubber Company Limited and certain other properties."

After Hall left Borneo, both subtle and overt criticisms began to surface. He had previously faced private criticism from the acting governor and the court for his failure to communicate effectively with his staff, which led to some unrest. Publicly, he was criticised for not thinning his trees, employing poor tapping techniques, and exaggerating the area planted with rubber. Additionally, his health had deteriorated. It seems that he may have left his dual positions at Woodford and Lumat somewhat abruptly, with one source referring to the "termination" of the "late manager's services," though it may not be entirely accurate to interpret this as a formal dismissal. His immediate successor at Lumat Estate, MP Anderson, was particularly critical of Hall's performance.

== Death and will ==
On 27 March 1945, Hall died at the age of 79 in St. Mary's Hospital, Paddington, London. His final will, dated 19 February 1945, was not proved until 25 October 1946, nearly nineteen months after his death. His estate, valued at £1,597 gross and £689 net, was unexpectedly modest. The primary assets consisted of life insurance and shares, notably in Rubbaglas Limited and Impervia Limited. This suggests that either his major assets had been distributed prior to his death, or he had faced relatively challenging financial circumstances.

== Personal life ==
Hall was also a passionate yachtsman, holding senior positions in various yacht clubs and winning numerous championship cups. He was survived by his widow, Mabel Edith, and their two daughters, Dorothy and Winifrede, as well as a son, Herbert Christopher (1892–1946), who notably adopted the surname 'Hatton-Hall.' By 1919, Hall had made South Devon his home. He had strong connections to the British establishment, including ties to Harry Sowler, who had married Holland's daughter, and to Sir William Holland, who had played a role in establishing the first Baron Rotherham in July 1910.
