= Batu Satu =

Area in Bandar Seri Begawan, Brunei

Batu Satu Parit
- Neighbourhood and village
- Kampong Parit
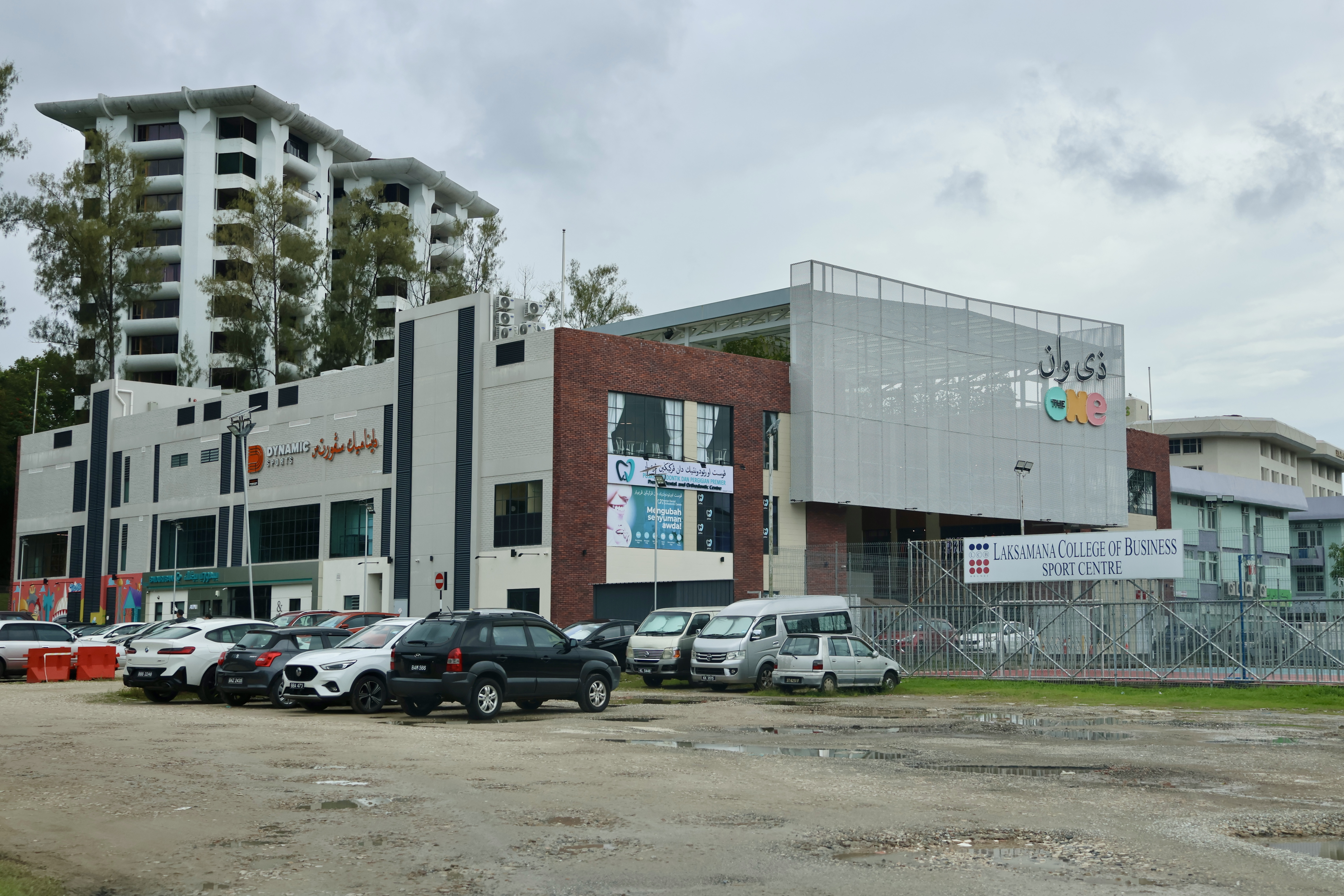
- The One shopping centre

- Location in Brunei
- Coordinates: 4°53′11″N 114°55′43″E
- Country: Brunei
- District: Brunei-Muara
- Mukim: Kianggeh

Government
  - Village head: Lawi Lamat

Population (2016)
  - Total: 1,509
- Time zone: UTC+8 (BNT)
- Postcode: BA1912

Batu Satu, also known as Kampong Parit, is an area in Bandar Seri Begawan, the capital of Brunei. It is also a designated village in Brunei-Muara District, within Mukim Kianggeh. The population was 1,509 in 2016. It encompasses a commercial area of the capital.

== History ==
The people who lived in Kampong Sumbiling Baru moved to Kampong Mata-Mata, which was farther inland, in 1970. In the same year, the roads leading to Jalan Tutong were expanded through land reclamation and destruction. The former location of Kampong Sumbiling Baru was cleared and expanded towards Kampung Ujong Bukit as part of this development. The Supreme Court building, which is now situated close to the banks of the Kedayan River, was also built as part of these efforts; however, it is believed that Kampong Parit did not initially own it.

== Infrastructure ==
=== Commerce ===
Utama Bowling, located in the commercial area, was the first bowling alley in Brunei. It once hosted bowling games during the 1999 Southeast Asian Games.

=== Education ===
Seri Begawan Religious Teachers University College (KUPU SB) is a teacher-training institution that primarily prepares educators for religious primary schools in Brunei. The Hassanal Bolkiah Boys' Arabic Secondary School is the only Islamic religious sixth form college in the country, inaugurated in May 1967 by Sultan Omar Ali Saifuddien III. The Raja Isteri Pengiran Anak Damit Girls' Arabic Religious Secondary School is a girls' Islamic religious secondary school, established on 1 March 1966. The Laksamana College of Business was founded in 2003 in collaboration with Abdul Razak Holdings and Kensington College of Business.

=== Places of interest ===
- The Tugu Peringatan Lebuhraya Hassanal Bolkiah, constructed around 1986, is located along Jalan Tutong, opposite the Civil Court Building of Brunei and in front of the old cemetery in Kampong Sumbiling Baru. Built entirely of concrete, this monument was established upon the royal decree of Sultan Hassanal Bolkiah. On 18 August 1986, the sultan officially inaugurated the completed Sultan Hassanal Bolkiah Highway, which stretches from Muara to the Tutong District, from the city center through Berakas, the Brunei International Airport, and connects to the Subok and Mentiri areas, forming part of the national highway. This highway was included in the National Development Plan for 1990.
- The Royal Mausoleum is an important historical and cultural site in Brunei. Situated along the Brunei River, beyond Kampong Ayer and on the route to Istana Nurul Iman from the city centre, it serves as the burial ground for several Bruneian sultans and royal family members. The first monarch to be buried here was Sultan Omar Ali Saifuddin I, who died in 1795.
- The Duli Pengiran Muda Mahkota Pengiran Muda Haji Al-Muhtadee Billah Mosque, located in nearby Kampong Tamoi, began construction on 16 August 1995 and was opened on 16 January 1999. The mosque was built at a cost of B$13,000,000 and has the capacity to accommodate 1,500 worshippers. Among its facilities are a library and a room for preparing the deceased.
- Istana Parit ("Parit Palace") or Istana Temasek ("Temasek Palace") was a former royal residence of Sultan Ahmad Tajuddin. According to stories from the elders of Kampong Ayer near Kampong Parit, the palace was located at the entrance junction of the Royal Mausoleum, along the road between Duli Pengiran Muda Mahkota Pengiran Muda Haji Al-Muhtadee Billah Mosque and the area of KUPU SB. This was where the sultan resided with Tengku Raihani and other members of the royal family.
