= Kumbang Pasang =

Neighbourhood in Bandar Seri Begawan

Kampong Kumbang Pasang Kampung Kumbang Pasang
- Village
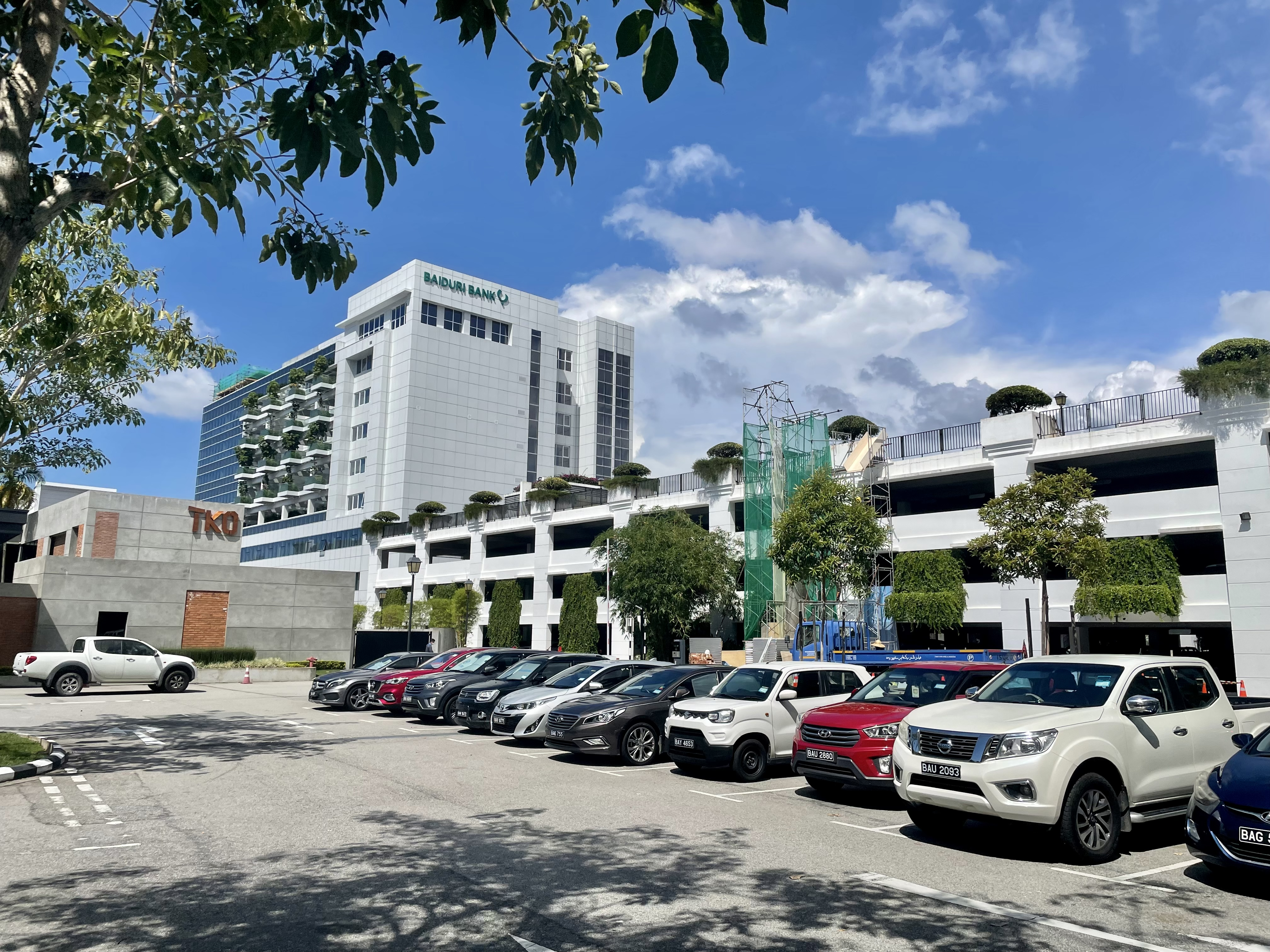
- One Riverside building

- Location in Brunei
- Coordinates: 4°54′24″N 114°55′45″E
- Country: Brunei
- District: Brunei-Muara
- Mukim: Kianggeh
- Established: 1910
- Founder: James Hatton Hall

Population (2016)
  - Total: 563
- Time zone: UTC+8 (BNT)
- Postcode: BA1511

Kampong Kumbang Pasang (Malay: Kampung Kumbang Pasang), or simply Kumbang Pasang, is a village within Mukim Kianggeh in Brunei-Muara District, Brunei. It is also part of the municipal area of the capital Bandar Seri Begawan. The population was 563 in 2016. It has the postcode BA1511. The village formerly hosts a rubber plantation and was named Kumbang Pasang Estate. Notably the village was once its own Mukim, known as Mukim Kumbang Pasang.

== Etymology ==
Kumbang Pasang, which is English for eddy water, others said that the name was derived from the term kumbang, which means beetle.

== History ==
James Hatton Hall founded the Kumbang Pasang Estate in 1910. Later in 1919, the Labu Estate in Temburong District was superseded as the primary site for rubber planting by the Kumbang Pasang Estate and the Gadong Estate. The majority of the area was utilized for rubber plantations prior to the discovery of oil. By the middle of the 1920s, land for cultivating rubber was in high demand. The government urged residents of Kampong Ayer to relocate to dry ground (such as Kumbang Pasang and Tungkadeh) and start farming. According to a 1924 source, Brunei United Plantations Limited (BUPL) owned four key rubber plantations in Kumbang Pasang, Menglait, Berakas and Melabau. On the morning of 27 April 1933, there was one call for a smoke house fire on the Kumbang Pasang Estate. Before the fire department arrived, the fire was already well under way, yet some of the structure could still be used. The plantation in Kumbang Pasang has a total area of 346 acres (140 ha). In 1953, the BUPL sold the Kumbang Pasang Estate to the Government of Brunei, and the government would establish a rubber nursery a year later.

By 1927, an earth road was made from Brunei Town to Kumbang Pasang Estate. In order to get motor vehicles to BUPL's Kumbang Pasang Estate, a 3 miles (4.8 km) road was built in 1932, later named Jalan Kumbang Pasang. Additionally, the road was one of the first major thoroughfares to be constructed as part of the government's initial RKN (National Development Plan) of 1953–1958. This road superseded an older temporary one constructed in the late 1920s to allow cars to go through to a rubber plantation. It connected to the Berakas and Muara localities and, by the late 1960s, to the Gadong area. Planned for completion by 1957, a road connecting from Kumbang Pasang to the Brunei Airport. 1979 saw the reservation of state land for Kampong Kumbang Pasang's landing stage and slipway site.

Mukim Kumbang Pasang was combined with Mukim Kianggeh for the purposes of the 2001 census. By 2014, the drainage in the village improved as it was previously flood-prone due to its close proximity with the Kedayan River.

== Economy ==
The village's first income was their rubber plantation from 1910 to 1953. A description of the examination of the two oils, pericarp oil and kernel oil, from a sample of fruits from Kumbang Pasang Estate was provided in a previous 1940 issue of The Malayan Agricultural Journal.

== Transportation ==
In 1972, Jalan Kumbang Pasang was resurfaced from Jalan Tutong junction to Jalan Tapak Kuda. By 1986, the road connects to Jalan Dato Mohd. Taib in the South.

== Infrastructure ==
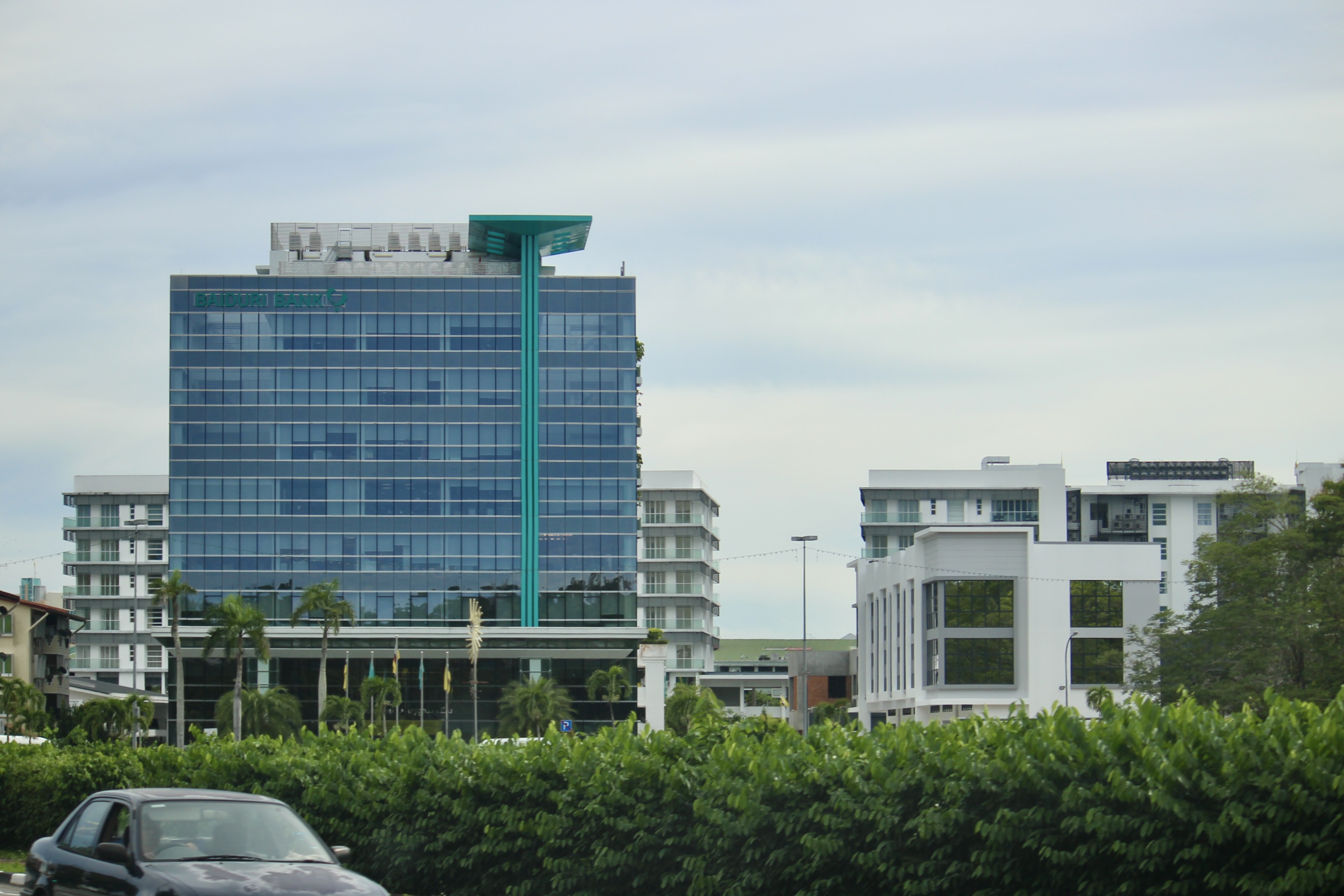
Baiduri Bank Headquarters (left)

=== Commercial ===
- Baiduri Bank Headquarters, foundation laying on 14 May 2018.
- Yayasan Sultan Haji Hassanal Bolkiah (YSHHB) Headquarters.

One Riverside is Brunei's first upscale residential and business complex. The complex features 84 condominiums, each designed with three bedrooms, a study, a utility room, and a kitchen, complemented by stylish interiors. Residents also have access to a first-level private parking area and individual courtyard gardens. A riverside promenade and a walking path connected to Kiulap via a pedestrian bridge. Residents can opt for a boat ride from the seafront to Gadong or Kiulap.

=== Government ===
- Bandar Seri Begawan Municipal Department, the capital's municipality building.
- Rumah Jerambak, official residence of Menteri Besar of Brunei.

=== Education ===
- In 1941, the first building of St. George's School was constructed.
