= Pengiran Muda Abdul Fattaah =

Bruneian prince (born 1982)

Abdul Fattaah عبد الفتاح
- Born: 8 March 1982 (age 44); Brunei
- Spouse: Pengiran Elina Zuraidah (m. 2018)
Regnal name
- Yang Amat Mulia Pengiran Muda Abdul Fattaah ibni Paduka Seri Pengiran Perdana Wazir Sahibul Himmah Wal-Waqar Pengiran Muda Mohamed Bolkiah
- House: Bolkiah
- Father: Prince Mohamed Bolkiah
- Mother: Pengiran Anak Zariah
- Education: Royal Military Academy Sandhurst; University of Surrey (BSc); Brunel University London (PhD)

- Military career
- Allegiance: Brunei
- Branch: Royal Brunei Land Force
- Years of active service: c. 2006
- Rank: Lieutenant
- Commands: Second Battalion RBLF

Abdul Fattaah ibni Mohamed Bolkiah (Note: State publications still refer to him as Pengiran Muda Abdul Fattaah rather than Prince Abdul Fattaah, even though sons of the sultan and the oldest son of the Wazirs with their royal spouses are referred to as Pengiran Muda, a Bruneian aristocratic title that means "Prince" in English.) (born 8 March 1982) is a member of the royal family of Brunei. He is the second son and fourth children of Prince Mohamed Bolkiah by his late wife, Pengiran Anak Hajah Zariah, thus making him a prince of Brunei, and the nephew of Sultan Hassanal Bolkiah. Notably, he is the chairman of Baiduri Bank's board of directors. In addition, Abdul Fattah serves as a director for a variety of well-known Brunei businesses that are involved in facilities management, hospitality, business services, and real estate development.

== Education ==
Prince Edward, Duke of Kent, and Chancellor of Surrey University awarded Pengiran Muda Abdul Fattah with his Bachelor of Science (BSc) degree in Economics during his graduation ceremony at Guildford Cathedral on 13 June 2002. In 2013, he earned a PhD in international business from Brunel University London.

== Military career ==
Four cadet officers of the Royal Brunei Armed Forces (RBAF) have been promoted on Sultan Hassanal Bolkiah's orders. The promotion ceremony, which included the presence of their sons Abdul Fattah and Abdul Mu'min, was attended by their parent, Prince Mohamed Bolkiah and Pengiran Anak Hajah Zariah with their agreement. On 8 June 2007, the Officers' Mess at Berakas Garrison hosted the promotion ceremony. With effect from 13 April earlier that year, he was promoted to Lieutenant. The Second Battalion of the Royal Brunei Land Forces (RBLF) was led by him as its platoon commander. From 8 January to 13 April 2007, both brothers had been enrolled in a cadet officers' programme at the Royal Military Academy Sandhurst.

== Marriage ==
Prince Sufri Bolkiah and other members of the royal family attended the Akad Nikah (solemnization of marriage vows) ceremony of Abdul Fattah and Dayangku Elina Zuraidah binti Pengiran Kamaluddin on 6 September 2018, at the Omar Ali Saifuddien Mosque in the capital. The bersanding ceremony was held at the Balai Penghadapan Bukit Kayangan on the 9th, with the Sultan of Brunei and special guests, Sultan Iskandar Mahmud Badaruddin and Permaisuri Ratu Anita Soviah in attendance.

== Political positions ==
=== Economy ===
Abdul Fattaah stated that Brunei has a small, young population, which has the advantage of being lively and full of interesting individuals, on 22 September 2023. A small consumer base and a small talent pool are obstacles, though. The Sultanate, like many tiny economies, is primarily dependent on oil and gas. Its industry is the most developed in the nation, and many workers view the government and fossil fuel companies as desirable employers and important economic drivers.

=== Digitalisation ===
On 22 November 2022, Abdul Fattaah emphasized that operating in the digital world have been implemented by the health care and education sectors, and that remote learning and telehealth, such as consultations via the internet that can be readily planned with doctors in other countries, have witnessed growth. He stated that it is crucial to ensure that all individuals can use these technologies and that the worldwide epidemic has also highlighted the adaptability of business owners and leaders.

== Honours ==
Honours awarded to him are as follows:

- Sultan of Brunei Silver Jubilee Medal (5 October 1992)
- Sultan of Brunei Golden Jubilee Medal (5 October 2017)
- National Day Silver Jubilee Medal (23 February 2009)
- General Service Medal (Armed Forces)
- Proclamation of Independence Medal (1 January 1984)

== Notes ==
Pengiran Muda Abdul Fattaah House of Bolkiah Born: 8 March 1982
Preceded by Abdul Muhaimin	Succession to the Bruneian throne 10th position	Succeeded by Abdul Mu'min
