= Tungku Highway =

Highway in Brunei

Coordinates: 4.9488541°N 114.9050899°E

Tungku Highway

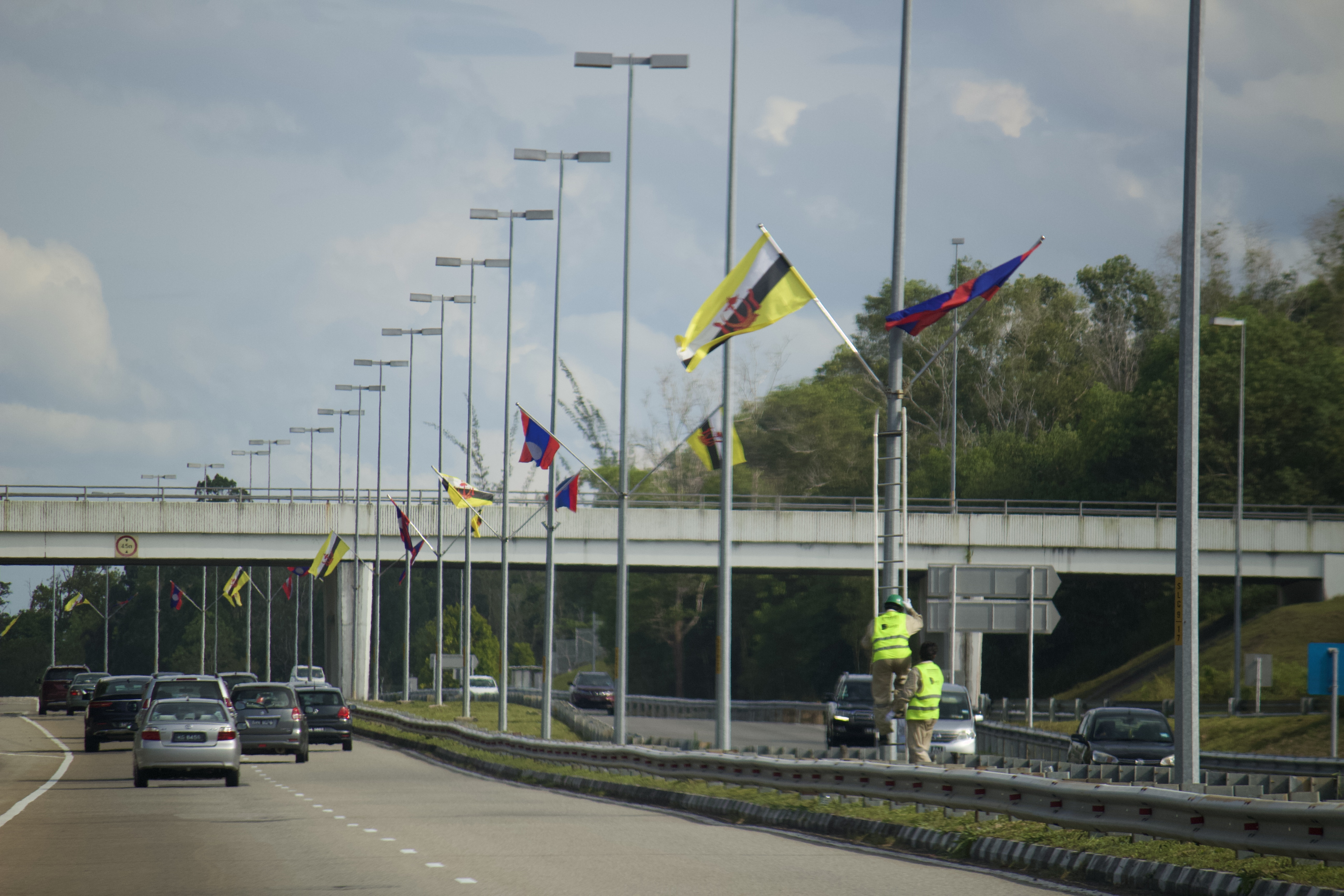

Major junctions
- North West end: Tungku Beach, Gadong
- Muara–Tutong Highway; Rimba Highway; Jalan Pengiran Babu Raja; Sultan Hassanal Bolkiah Highway
- South East end: Menglait, Gadong

Location
- Country: Brunei
- Districts: Brunei-Muara District

Highway system
- Brunei National Roads System

Tungku Highway (Malay: Lebuhraya Tungku) (Jawi: جالن توڠكو لينك) (formerly known as Tungku Link Road or Tungku Link) is a major controlled-access highway in Brunei-Muara District, Brunei, serving a major role in connecting the main east-west highway in Brunei to Bandar Seri Begawan, the capital and most populous city in Brunei.

== History ==
On 14 May 2011, the Minister of Development, Pehin Orang Kaya Indera Pahlawan Dato Seri Setia Awang Haji Suyoi Haji Osman, launched 11 new road names. One of them is the former Tungku Link Road which has been upgraded to a highway status and renamed as Tungku Highway.

== Junction list ==
Intersection names are conjectural and unofficial.

Incomplete access

- I/C - interchange, I/S - intersection

County	Location	KM	Intersection	Destinations	Remarks
Gadong	Tungku Beach	0	Tungku I/C	Muara–Tutong Highway: Jerudong, Lambak, Tutong, Serasa, Muara, Seria, Kuala Belait	
Gadong	Tungku Beach		University I/C	Jalan Universiti: Telekom Brunei Berhad, DST Headquarters, Jerudong International School, Universiti Brunei Darussalam, Institut Teknologi Brunei	
Gadong	Rimba		Rimba North I/C	Jalan Dang Kumala: Giant Hypermarket Tasek Rimba, Rimba Housing Estate	
Gadong	Rimba		Rimba South I/C	Jalan Rakyat Jati Rimba: Rakyat Jati Housing Estate, Rimba, Tungku, Katok; Rimba Link Road: Rimba Housing Estate, Lambak Kanan Housing Estate, Terunjing	
Gadong	Rimba		Simpang 256 Jalan Kampung Rimba		Northwest-bound only
Gadong	Rimba		Simpang 232 Tungku Highway		Southeast-bound only
Gadong	Rimba		Simpang 212-28 Jalan Kampung Rimba		Northwest-bound only
Gadong	Batu Bersurat		Gadong Estate I/C	Jalan Estet Gadong: Tungku, Rimba, Katok, Gadong, Beribi Industrial Estate, Beribi, Kiarong	
Gadong	Batu Bersurat		Simpang 128 Tungku Highway		Southeast-bound only
Gadong	Batu Bersurat		Batu Bersurat Exit	Jalan Batu Bersurat: Batu Bersurat	Southeast-bound exit only
Gadong	Batu Bersurat		Simpang 100 Tungku Highway		Southeast-bound only
Gadong	Menglait		Simpang 85 Tungku Highway		Northwest-bound only
Gadong	Menglait		Menglait I/C	Sultan Hassanal Bolkiah Highway: Gadong, Brunei International Airport, Serusop, Kiarong, Kiulap, Lambak, Bandar Seri Begawan Mentiri, Sungai Akar	
