= Baiduri Bank =

Bank in Brunei

Coordinates: 4.9056878°N 114.9297504°E

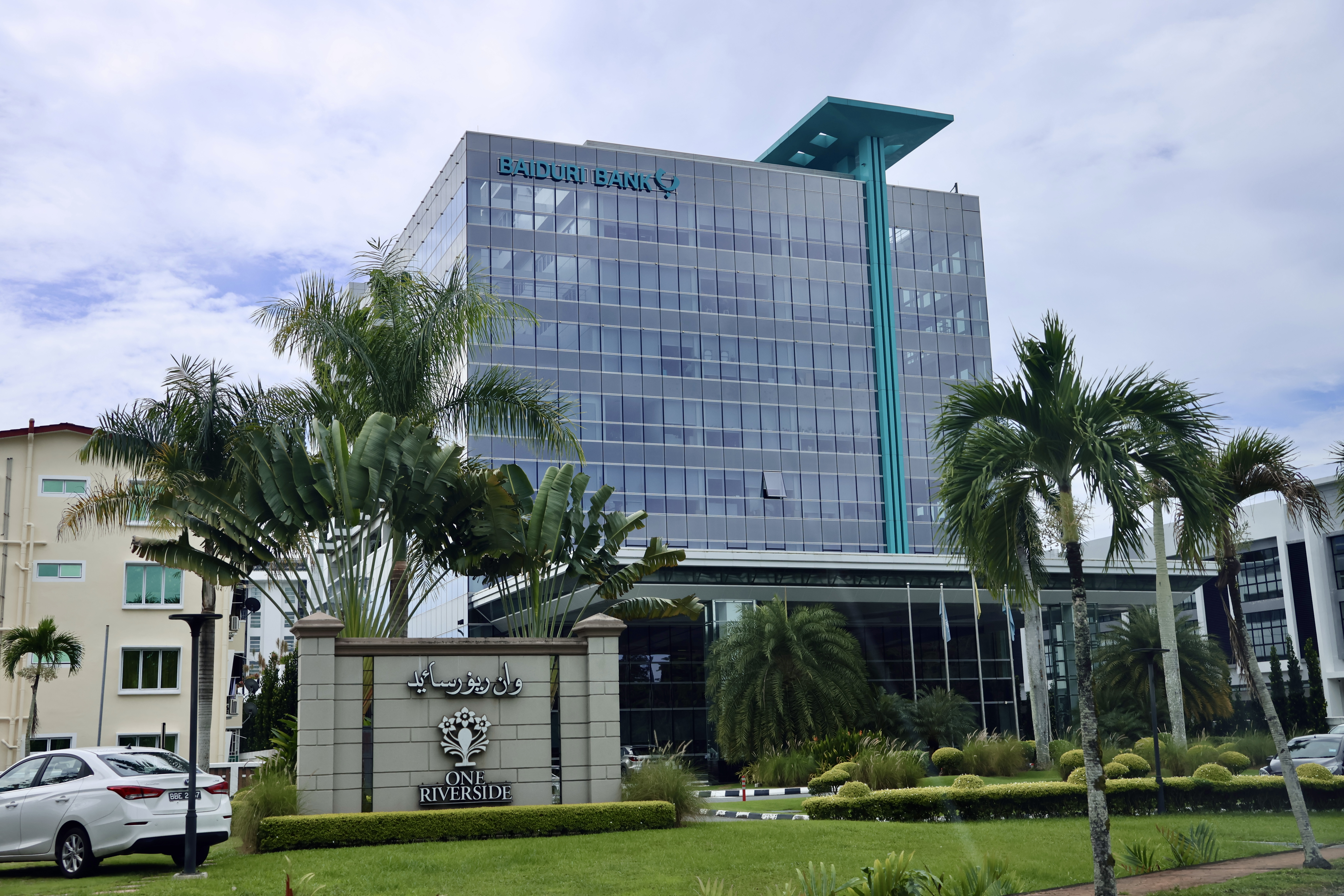
- Baiduri Bank's headquarters in Kumbang Pasang, Brunei
- Type: Private
- Industry: Financial services
- Founded: 1994; 32 years ago
- Headquarters: Baiduri Bank Headquarters, 1 Jalan Gadong, Bandar Seri Begawan, Brunei
- Area served: Brunei
- Key people: Chairman : Abdul Fattaah; CEO : Ti Eng Hui
- Products: Banking services; credit cards; corporate banking
- Services: Retail banking; corporate banking; investment management; insurance; wealth management
- Revenue: ▼BND196.826 million (2025)
- Net income: ▲BND97.165 million (2025)
- Total assets: ▲BND4.269 billion (2025)
- Owner: Baiduri Holdings; Darussalam Assets
- Subsidiaries: Baiduri Finance; Baiduri Capital
- Rating: S&P: BBB+/A–2
- Website: www.baiduri.com.bn

Baiduri Bank is a Brunei bank that is one of the major providers of financial services in Brunei. Baiduri Bank caters to retail, MSMEs, corporate, and institutional customers. The principal stakeholder of Baiduri Holdings, the entity that owns 60% of Baiduri Bank, is Pengiran Anak Hajah Zariah, the princess consort to Prince Mohamed Bolkiah.

As of 2019, Baiduri had 11 branches, two branches for its finance division, and 33 ATMs. Additionally, the bank provided two versions of its online banking service—one for personal and one for commercial usage. A mobile app version of Baiduri b.Digital Personal is also accessible. Darussalam Assets and Baiduri Holdings are the Bank's shareholders.

Since its founding in 1996, Baiduri Finance—a wholly owned subsidiary of Baiduri Bank—has grown to become the nation's top auto lender. Another wholly owned subsidiary, Baiduri Capital, began operations in June 2015 and provides online trading platform services for equities trading. Access to the NASDAQ, NYSE, HKEx, BURSA Malaysia, China A-shares, and other foreign stock exchanges is now possible.

== History ==
The bank started operating on 13 January 1993, and adheres to Islamic banking standards. Baiduri Bank was founded in 1994 as a commercial bank that served corporate clients. Initially, the royal family and Royal Brunei Airlines (RBA) were the main owners of the privately held Baiduri Bank.

In 1994, a deal has been made by the French bank BNP Paribas to purchase a 15% stake in Baiduri Bank Berhad.

The fully owned subsidiary of Baiduri Bank, Baiduri Finance, obtained ISO9001:2015 certification, which is a mark of a quality management system. The bank was the nation's first debit card issuer in 2001. In addition to becoming the first bank in Brunei to provide PIN-based security, Baiduri introduced the UnionPay debit card in 2010.

Baiduri established its Business Hub in 2015, which connected to small- and non-borrowing accounts to supplement the corporate banking division. Additionally, under the BSP Credit Facility Program, Baiduri and Brunei Shell Petroleum (BSP) joined to provide funding to regional companies. In Brunei, it has established itself as the top traditional bank. HSBC Brunei's retail and commercial banking portfolio was acquired by Baiduri Bank in 2024 which has a credit rating from Standard and Poor's of BBB+/A–2.

The bank made a deal with Temenos on 1 November 2022, to operate its primary financial services on a cloud-based software as a service (SaaS) platform. A digital banking solution for enterprises, Baiduri b.Digital Business, was introduced in September 2022.

Baiduri changed its personal banking app after relaunching its digital banking service for companies in September 2023 with a number of new features. Additionally, it introduced Baiduri Qpay, a digital wallet that has become popular among users. In 2023, Baiduri's net earnings increased 12.1% year over year to Br$65.6 million ($49 million), with a 12.77% increase in return on equity. As of 2024, Baiduri Finance is the only financing provider in Brunei that have obtained this well acknowledged accreditation. Additionally, only Baiduri Bank has the most recent version 3.2.1 of PCI-DSS certification in Brunei.

== Senior leadership ==
The Corporate Governance Guidelines published by the Brunei Darussalam Central Bank (BDCB) serve as a guide for the principles of good corporate governance that the Baiduri Bank Group adheres to in the management and governance of Baiduri Bank Berhad. Six directors, including the chairman, make up the bank's board of directors, or the board.

- CEO: Ti Eng Hui (since 1 April 2019)
- Chairman: Prince Abdul Fattaah

=== List of former CEOs ===
- Pierre Imhof (2003–2019)

== Shareholders ==
As of 2018, the French multinational and financial services firm BNP Paribas, Baiduri Holdings, and Darussalam Assets are among the owners of Baiduri Bank. Additionally, Baiduri Bank and Brunei Shell Petroleum (BSP) have teamed up to provide local companies with finance under the BSP Credit Facility Program.
