= Kampong Menglait =

Village in Brunei-Muara, Brunei

Kampong Menglait Kampung Menglait
- Village and neighbourhood
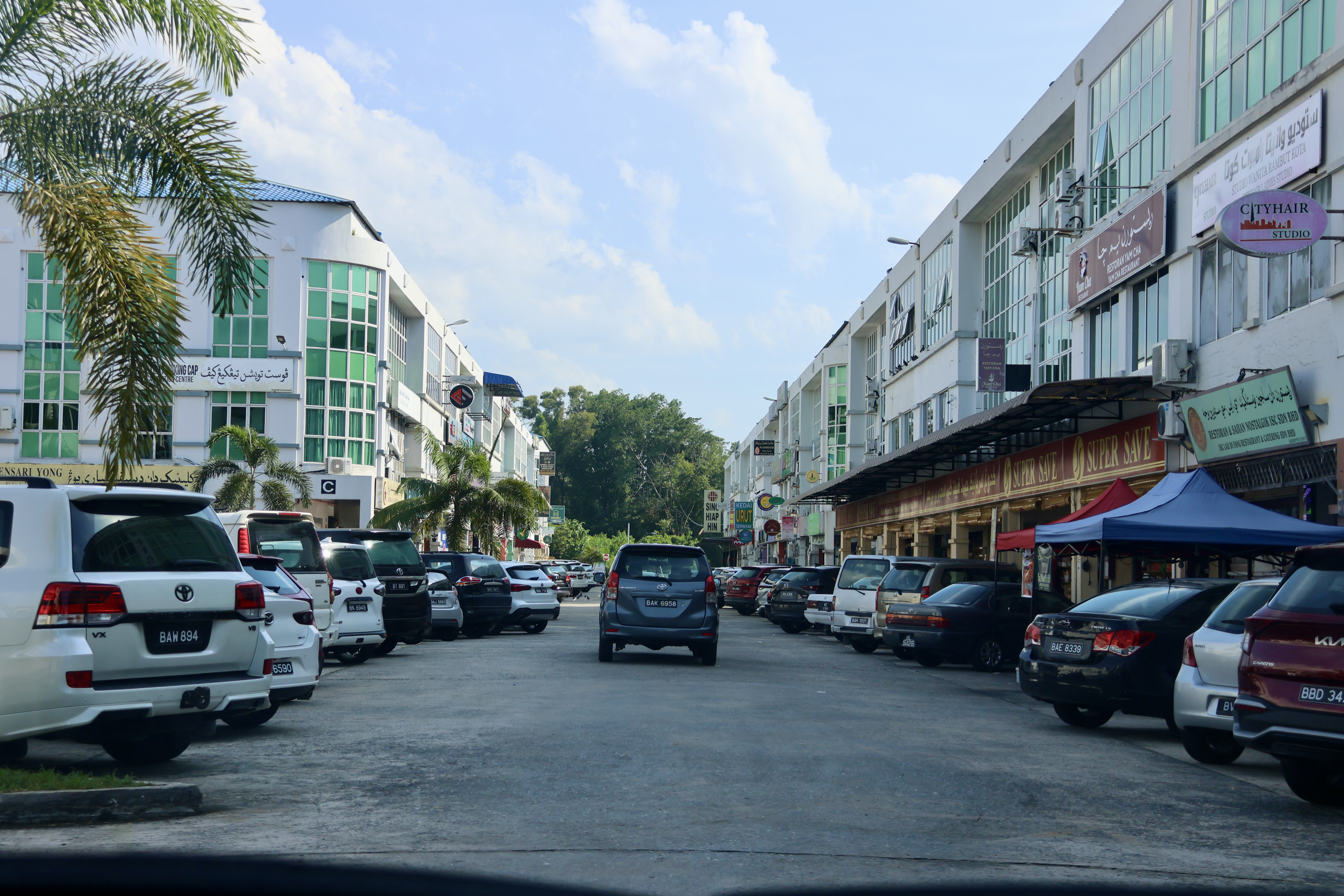
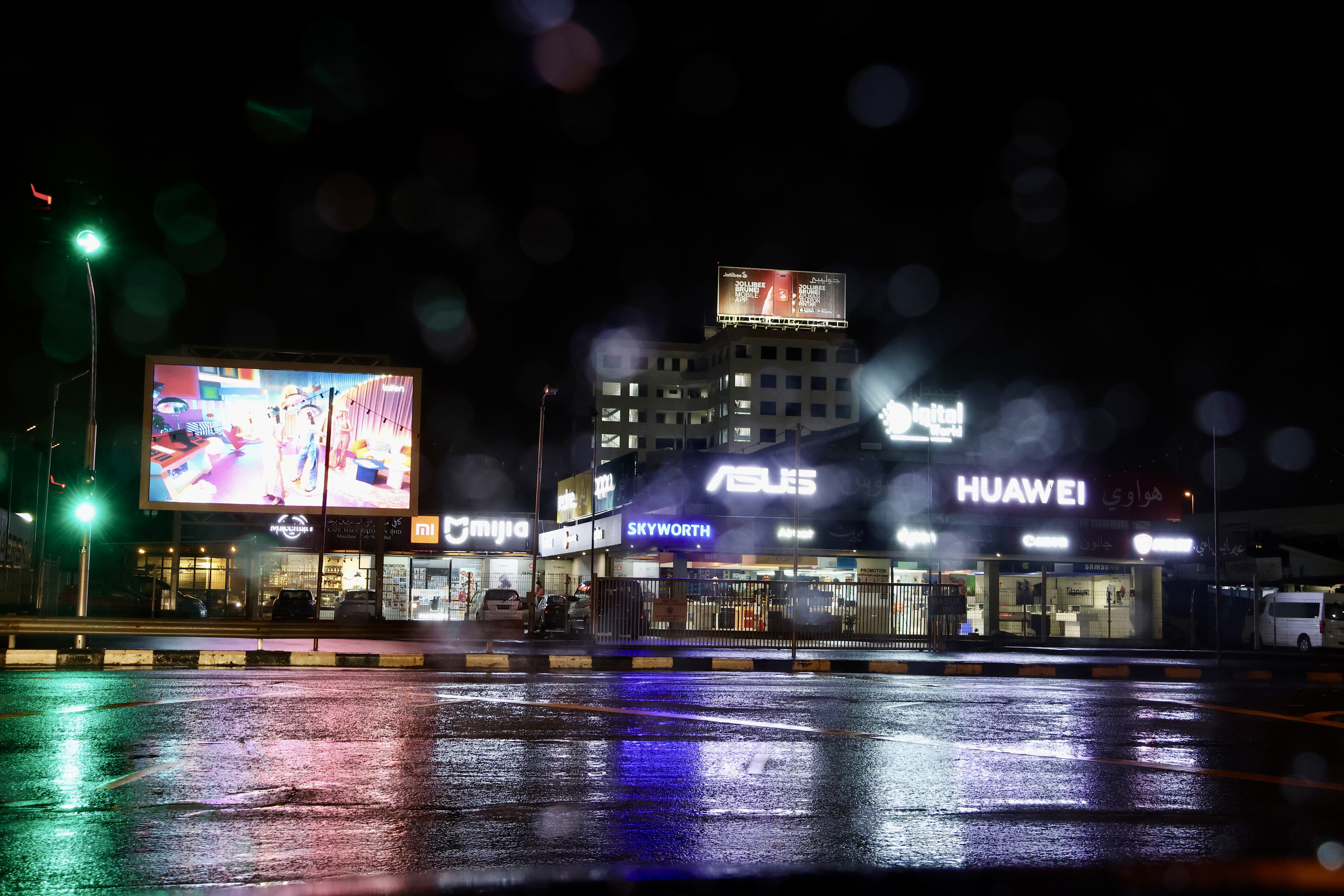
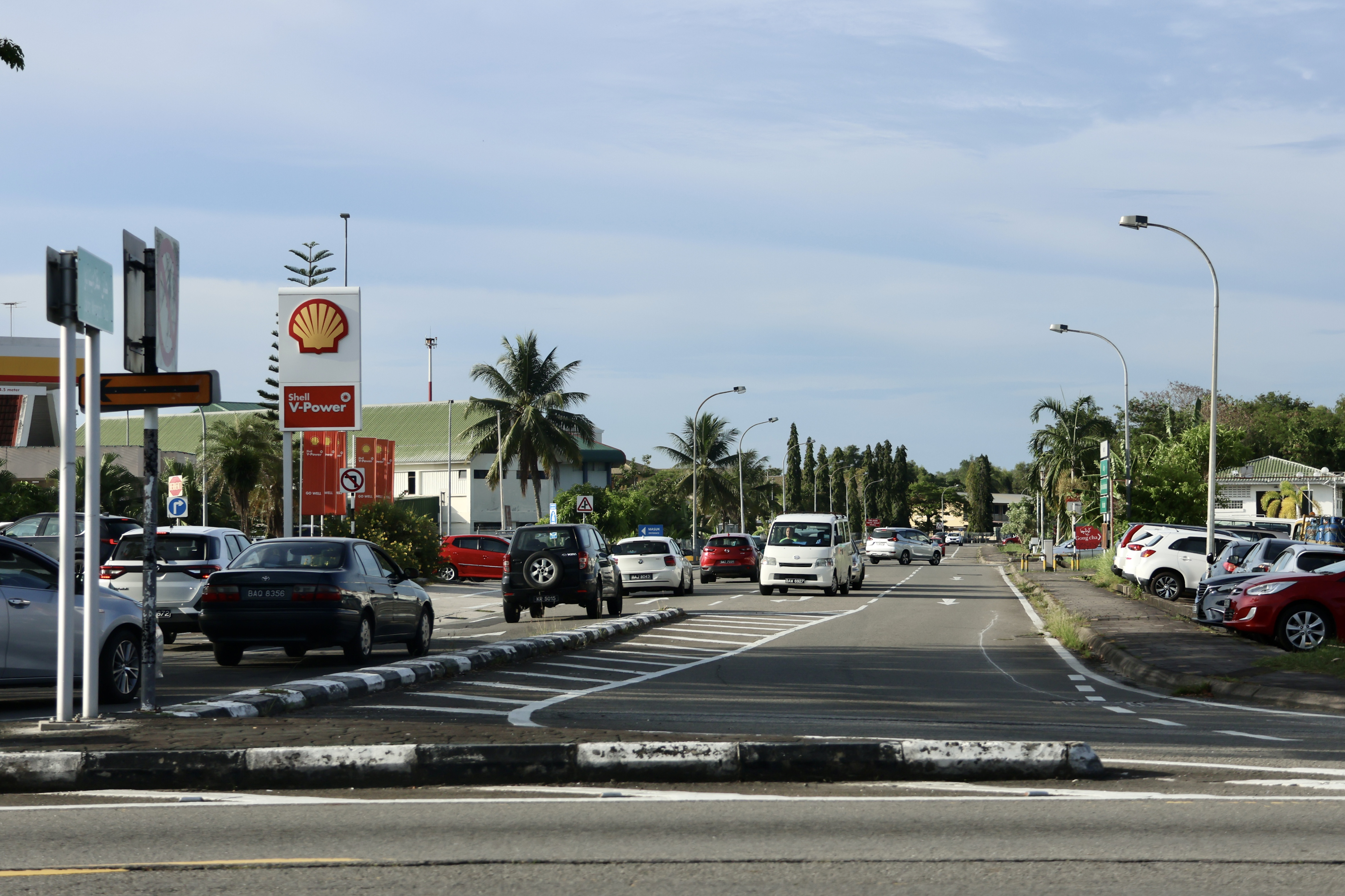
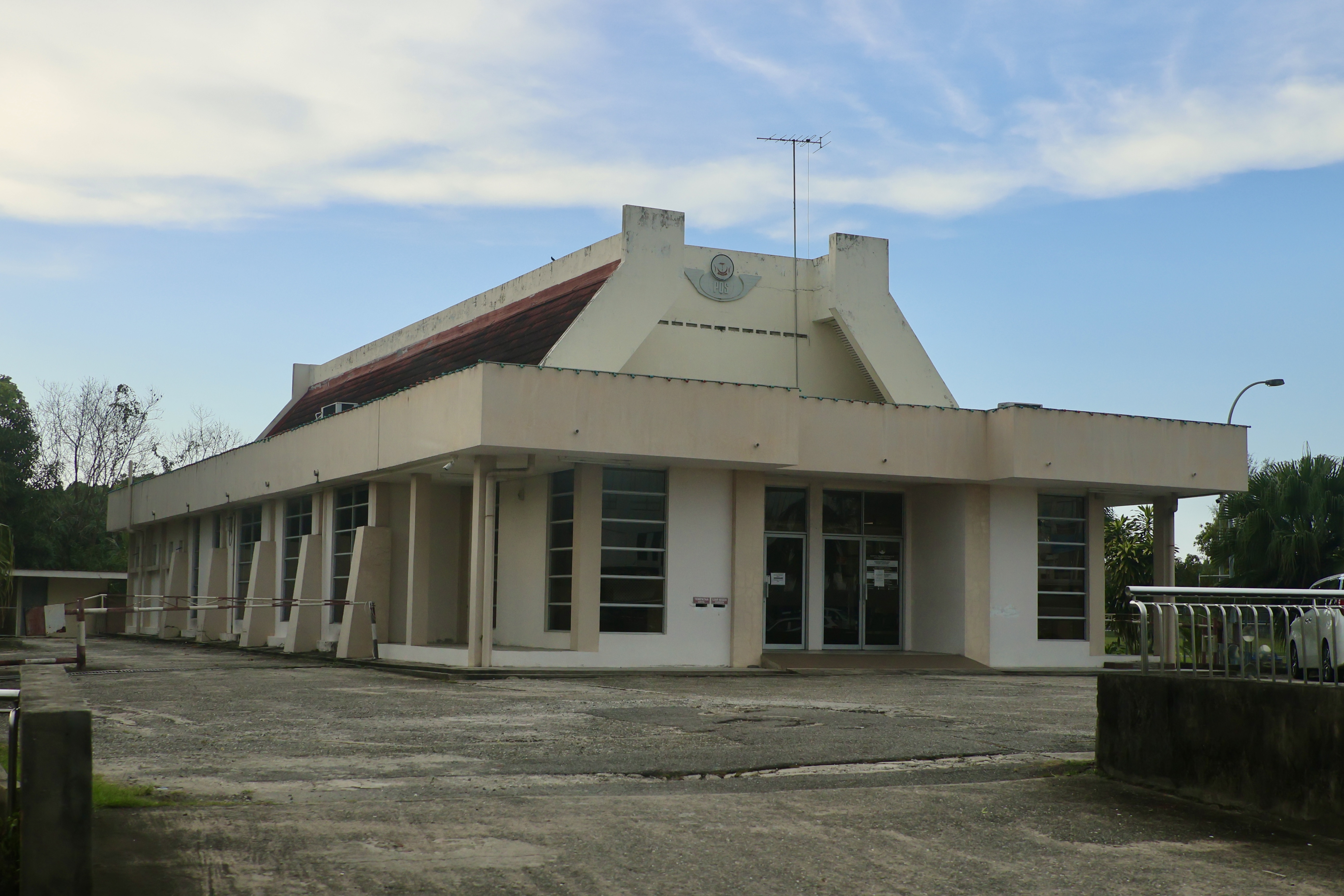
- Clockwise from top left: Menglait shophouses, shopping centre, post office, Jalan Menglait Dua

- Location in Brunei
- Coordinates: 4°54′54″N 114°55′26″E
- Country: Brunei
- District: Brunei–Muara
- Mukim: Gadong 'B'

Government
  - Village head: Othaman Patra

Area
  - Total: 125.3968 ha (309.862 acres)

Population (2016)
  - Total: 2,262
  - Density: 1,804/km^{2} (4,672/sq mi)
- Time zone: UTC+8 (BNT)
- Postcode: BE3919

Kampong Menglait (Malay: Kampung Menglait) or simply known as Menglait, is a village in Brunei–Muara District, Brunei, as well as a neighbourhood and commercial area in the capital Bandar Seri Begawan. The population was 2,262 in 2016. It is one of the villages within Mukim Gadong 'B'. The postcode is BE3919.

== Etymology ==
Kampong Menglait used to be known as Gadong Estate which was only filled with rubber plantations. In the past, the village was known as Sungai Asgar, which was believed to be the place where soldiers were raised and where they hid during the Second World War. Kampong Menglait and its surroundings are also known as Sungai Lubuk.

== History ==
In the 1980s, there were not many homes built. Up until the establishment of the position of the village head in 2002, problems of the village were directly presented to the then Penghulu Mukim Gadong. Kampong Pengkalan Gadong also includes Gadong Estate which covers the YMRM area (now) which is filled with rubber plantations, including Jalan Batu Bersurat, Jalan Haji Omar, Tungku link and Gadong Estate. For the workers going back and forth before there was a bridge built, a bantun (raft) was used to cross Sungai Kedayan. Gadong Estate was guarded by the westerners, Tuan (Mr.) Kuel and then Tuan Dubi. The raft pilot was Liau Damit and then replaced by Abdul Kadir whose salary is paid by the estate company.

While Jalan Batu Bersurat is reported orally from mouth to mouth, a grave was located. Some say that the grave belongs to the descendants of Sharif-sharif. It is located on a hill close to the complex of shop buildings on Jalan Batu Bersurat which is currently there. The original residents of Kampong Menglait are said to be from Kampong Pekan Lama and most of them consist of residents of Kampong Sungai Kedayan and also from Kampong Ujong Tanjung.

== Geography ==
Kampong Menglait's surrounding areas include Kampong Pengkalan Gadong, Jalan Batu Besurat, Jalan Haji Omar, Tungku Link and Gadong Estate.

== Administration ==
Kampong Menglait and its surroundings has more than 7,000 residents under his rule. The area of Kampung Menglait is about 83.15 hectares.

== Transportation ==
The road and bridge connecting the road from the Old Berakas Airport area to Kampong Menglait cost BND$8,473,341. It is used by the public for the smooth flow of traffic at the intersection of Jalan Kumbang Pasang and Sultan Hassanal Bolkiah Highway which is often congested. The bridge is also an alternative route to facilitate travel between the Gadong area and the Government Department Complex.

== Infrastructure ==
Like other villages in this country, Kampong Menglait also has its own facilities. Among them are a secondary school, a post office, a sports complex and a petrol station. This area is indeed quite rapidly developing and becoming the focus of business. Supermarket buildings and shops are indeed growing, therefore this area is quite busy because it is often the focus of many people.

The Menglait Sports Complex has two football fields, a sports hall (indoor sports court), an outdoor sports court, a martial arts hall and a dormitory. This complex also hosts prestigious sports events including the Southeast Asian Games (SEA Games) in 1999 and the ASEAN School Games. Sports held include football, badminton, netball, sepak takraw, basketball, volleyball, table tennis and martial arts sports, namely karate, taekwondo, silat and judo.
