= Kampong Kiarong =

Village in Brunei

Kiarong
- Village and neighbourhood
- Kampong Kiarong
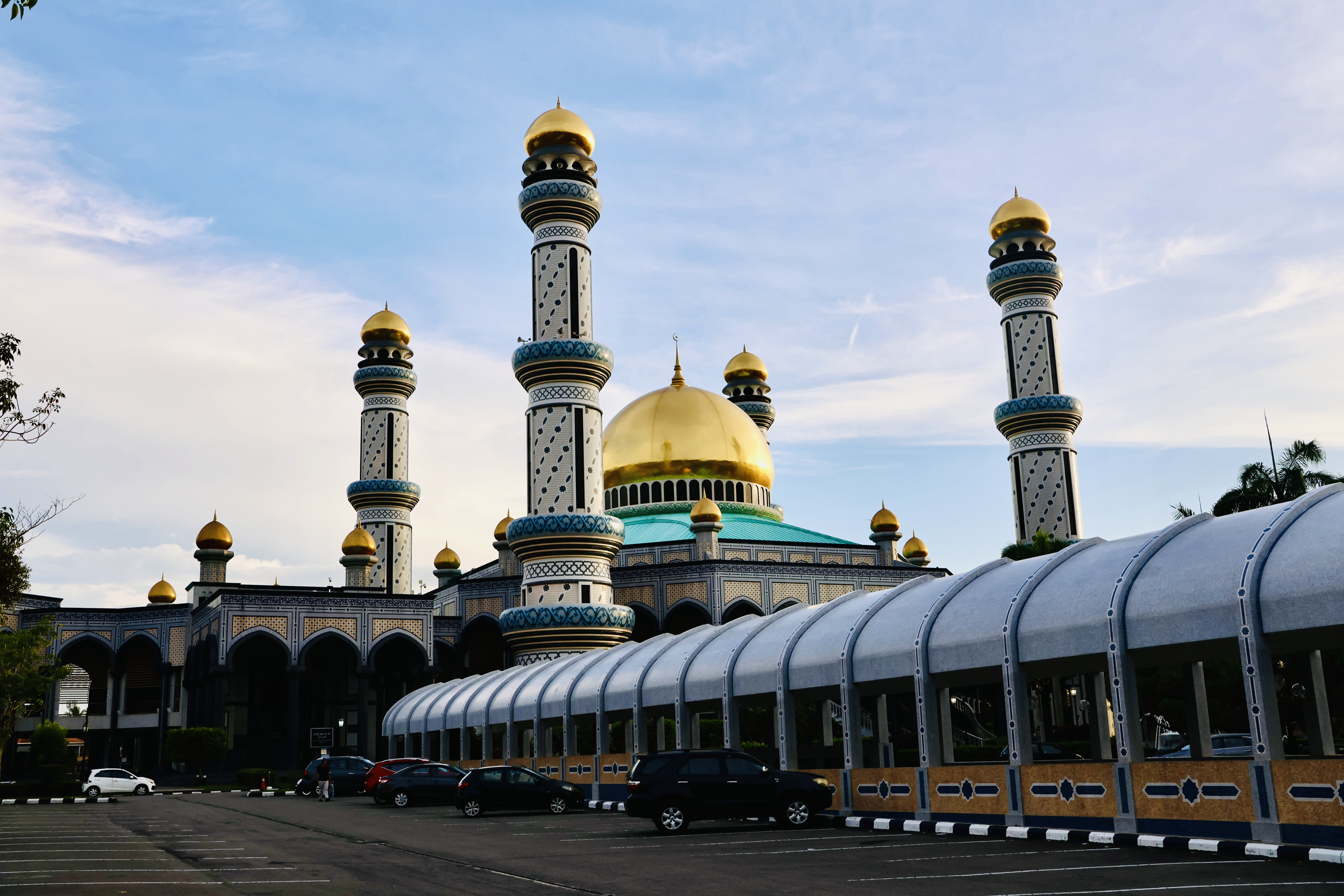
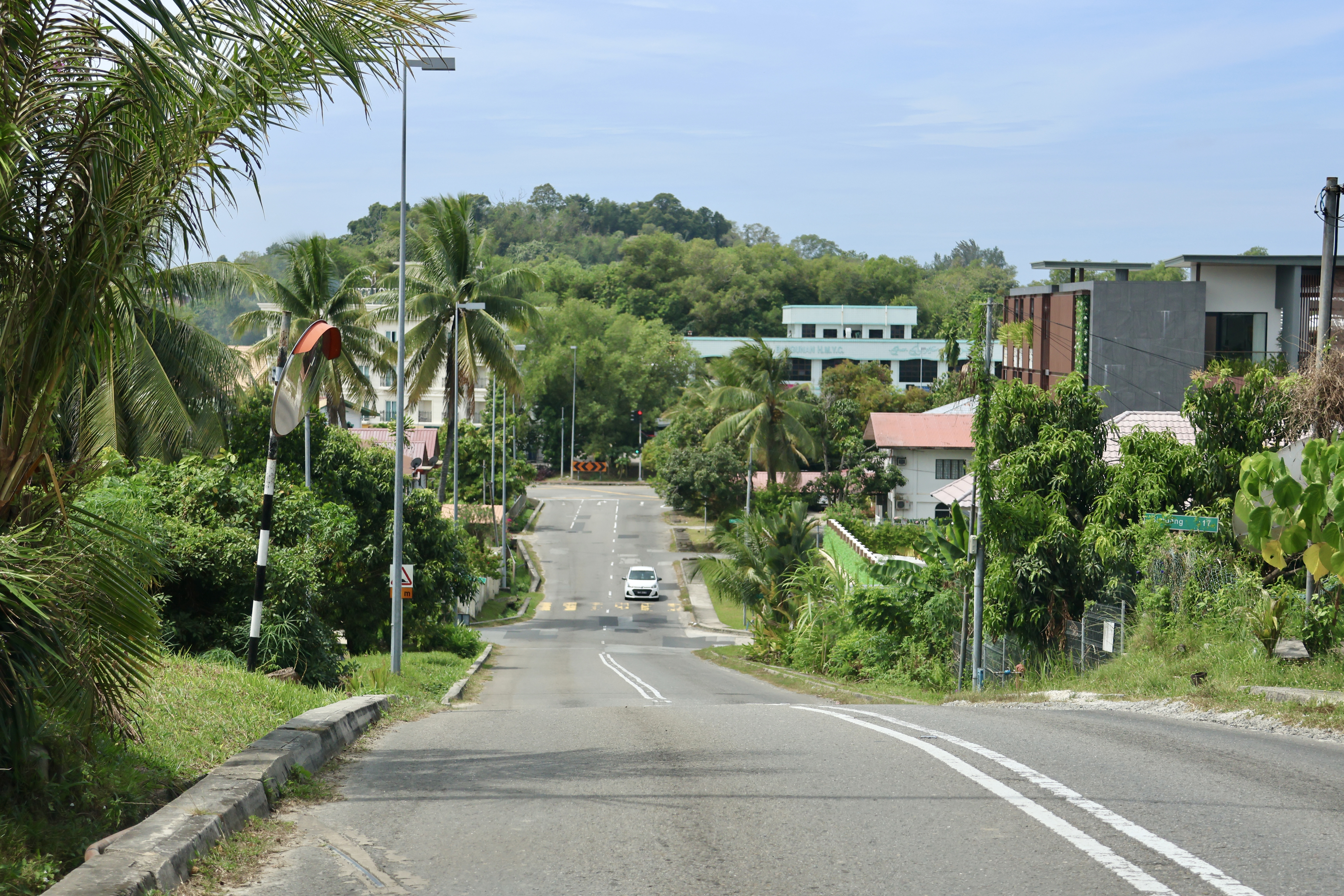
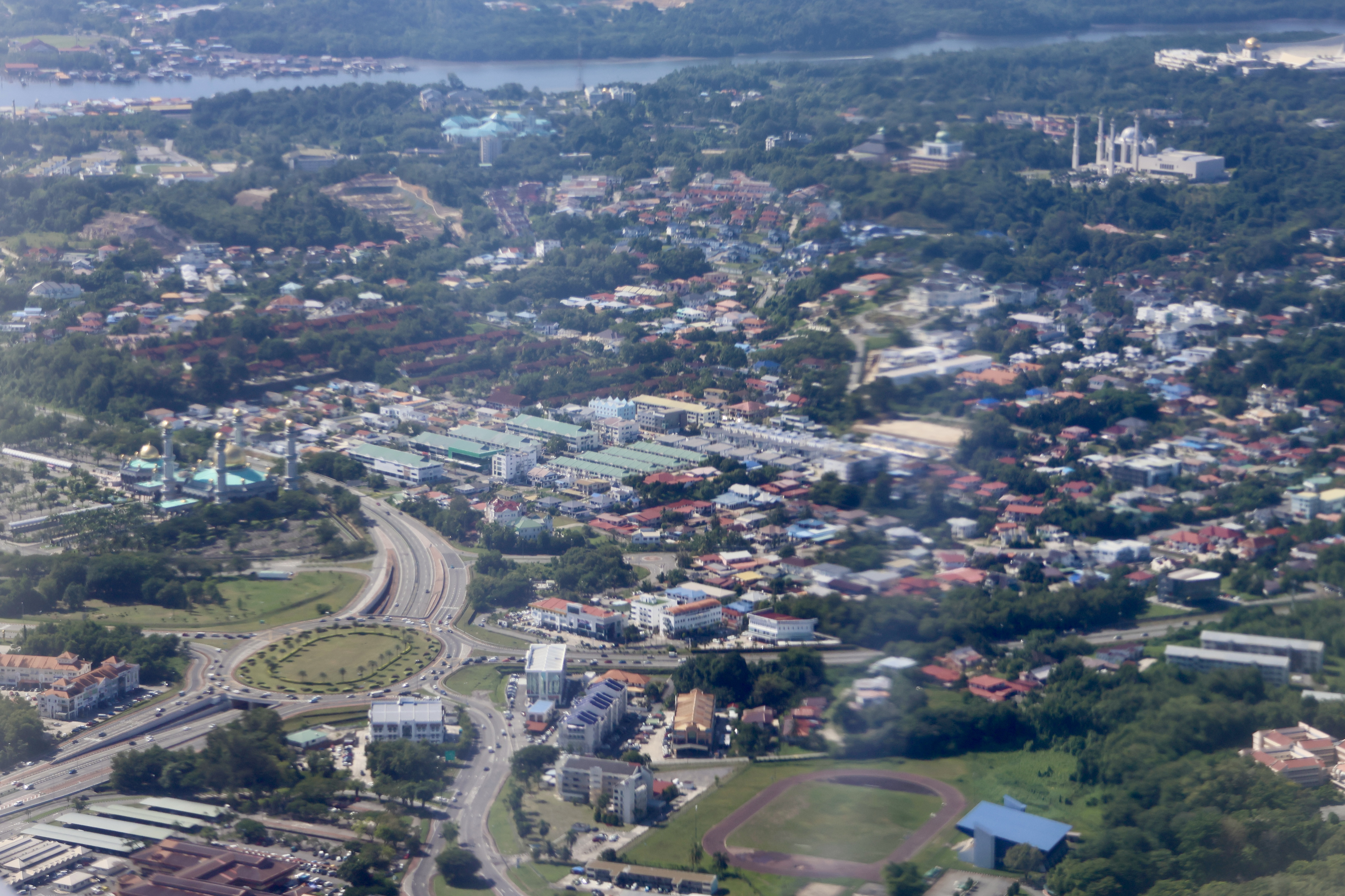
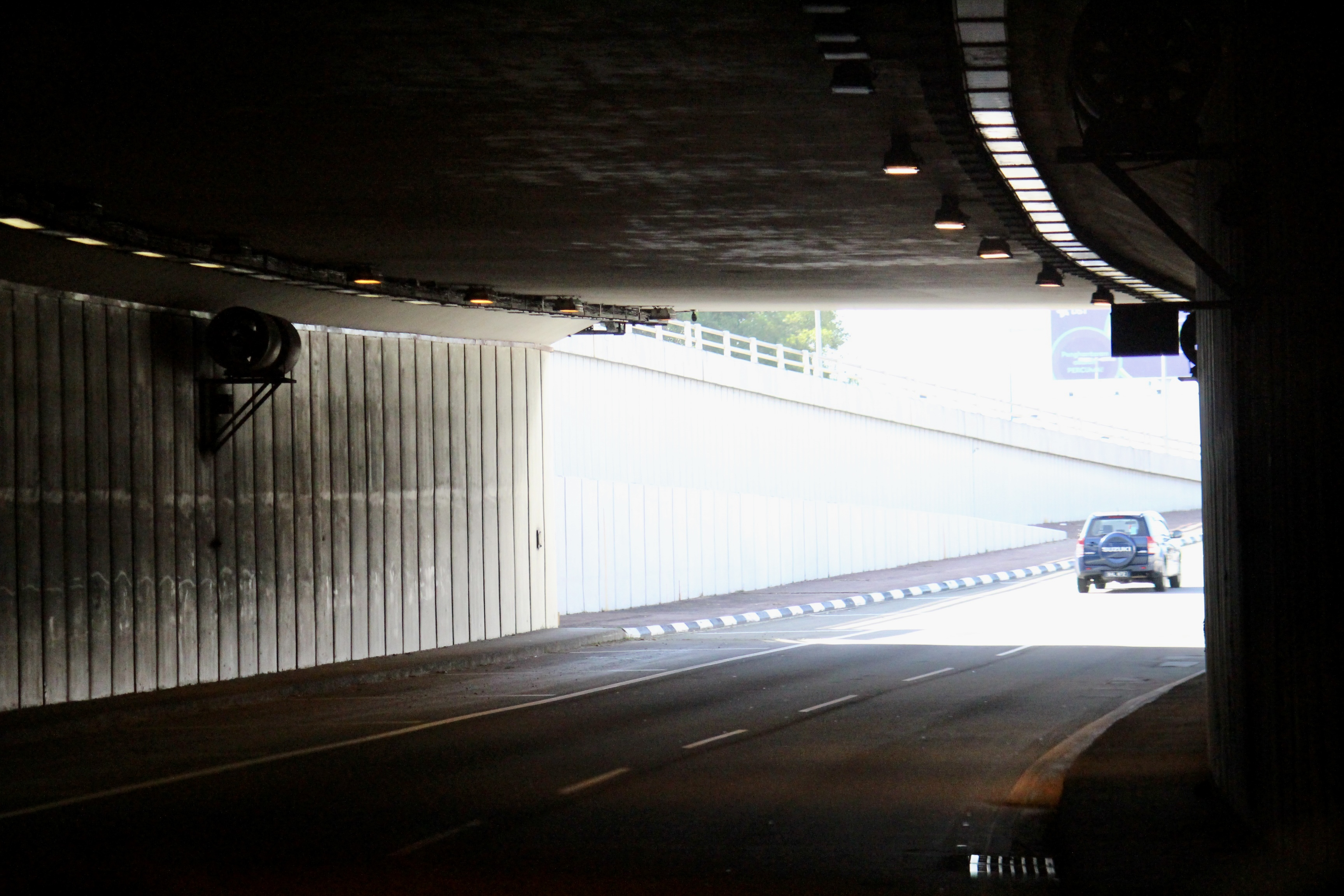
- Clockwise from top left: Jame' Asr Hassanil Bolkiah Mosque, Jalan Kiarong, Sultan Hassanal Bolkiah Highway, Jame'Asr Roundabout

- Location in Brunei
- Coordinates: 4°53′47″N 114°54′59″E
- Country: Brunei
- District: Brunei–Muara
- Mukim: Gadong 'B'

Government
  - Village head: Mohammad Shair

Area
  - Total: 383.43 ha (947.5 acres)

Population (2016)
  - Total: 4,530
  - Density: 1,180/km^{2} (3,060/sq mi)
- Time zone: UTC+8 (BNT)
- Postcode: BE1318

Kampong Kiarong (Malay: Kampung Kiarong) or commonly known as Kiarong, is a village in Brunei–Muara District, Brunei, as well as a neighbourhood in the country's capital Bandar Seri Begawan. It has an area of 383.43 hectares (947.5 acres); the population was 4,530 in 2016.

== Geography ==
The village is located in the central part of Brunei–Muara District, and about 4 kilometres (2.5 mi) from Bandar Seri Begawan city centre. The village is home to Kiarong Roundabout (or Jame'Asr Roundabout) in which the primary roads Sultan Hassanal Bolkiah Highway, Jalan Jame' Asr and Jalan Pasar Gadong (or Jalan Pasar Baharu) converge.

== History ==
The village had existed in the year 1900 and the name of the village is already known as Kampong Kiarong. However, it is believed that the village has two parts, Kiarong Kecil and Kiarong Besar. This village is also divided into several areas and given different names such as Kiduka area, Banawali area, Bukit Bintulang, Bukit Pantaran, Bukit Kijang Kuning, Banting, and Batung. The Bukit Bintulang area was given that name because the area was a former battlefield that left some dead. It is believed that the bamboo that grows in the area comes from the bamboo that was used during the fight.

Residents of Kampong Kiarong in the 1950s and 1960s worked cutting rubber, planting rice and also gardening. They usually garden in uncultivated land and every family that wishes to join in gardening will be given land according to the determined area. Usually this activity runs according to the season and when it is finished the land will be abandoned and then find new suitable and fertile land to make a place for gardening. In the 1960s, the roads in Kiarong were only dirt roads and were often deep when it heavily rained that caused the road to be impassable by any vehicle. Then the road was filled with sand and gravel until it was upgraded to a tar paved road.

== Administration ==
Kampong Kiarong is one of the villages within Mukim Gadong 'B', a mukim in the district. It is also part of the municipal area of Bandar Seri Begawan. The village has the postcode BE1318.

== Infrastructure ==
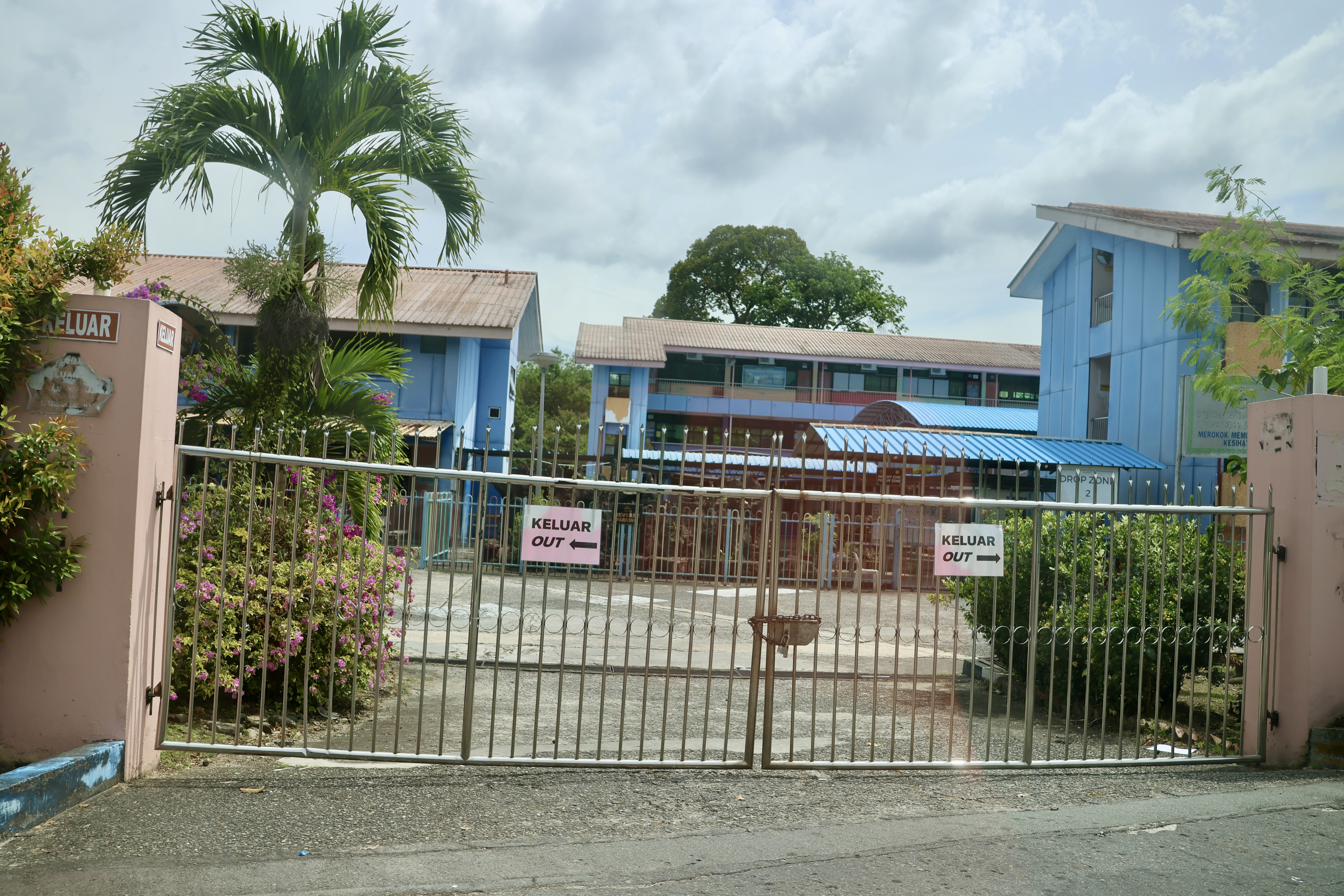
Datu Ratna Haji Mohammad Jaafar Primary School

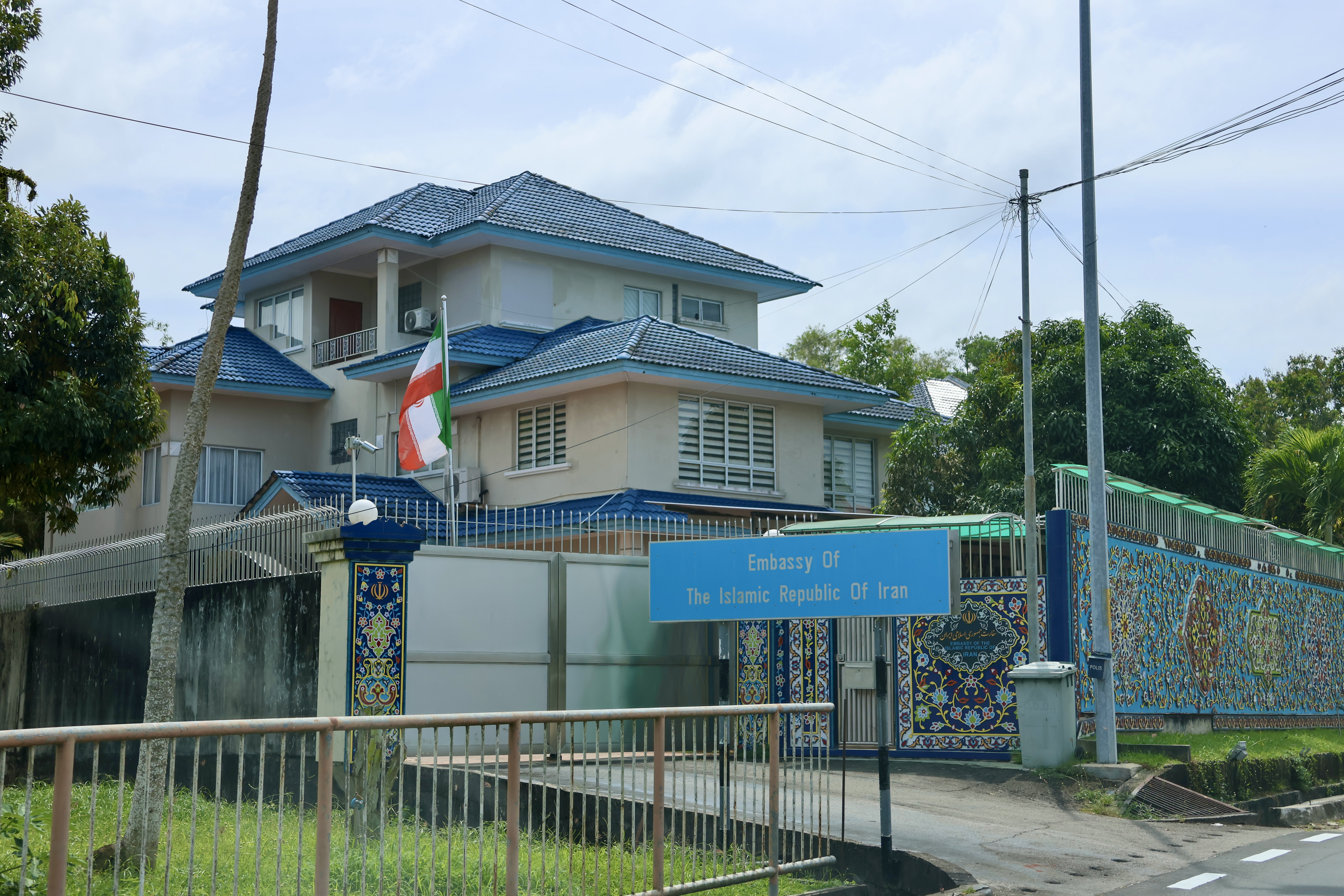
Embassy of Iran

Various facilities have been provided by the Government of Brunei such as electricity, water and telephone, DST and Progresif services, banks, Jame' Asr Hassanil Bolkiah Mosque, Datu Ratna Haji Muhammad Jaafar Kiarong Primary School, (Note: Datu Ratna Haji Mohammad Jaafar Primary School is the village's government primary school. It was established on 14 February 1965, initially known as Sekolah Melayu Kiarong ("Kiarong Malay School") and was housed in a temporary building. In 1985, the construction of the permanent building was completed and the school then became known as Kiarong Primary School (Sekolah Rendah Kiarong). The school absorbed the students from three former primary schools, namely Sekolah Melayu Pantai Jiam, Sekolah Rendah Menglait and Sekolah Rendah Pusat Pengajian. It finally adopted its current name on 20 October 2010 on the royal consent of Sultan Hassanal Bolkiah. It was named in honour of the first penghulu of Mukim Gadong who had made significant contribution to the local community. The school also shares grounds with Dato Ratna Haji Mohamed Ja'afar Religious School, the village's government school for the country's Islamic religious primary education.) Kiarong Religious School, Sultan Sharif Ali Islamic University, IBTE Business Campus, Duli Pengiran Muda Al-Muhtadee Billah College, SEAMEO Regional Centre, Dry Cough Clinic, Pasar Pelbagai Barangan Gadong, TAIB Petrol Station, housing buildings for government officials, shopping complexes and hotels. The village is also home to the Consulate of Chile and Embassies of Thailand, Kuwait and Iran.

=== Commerce ===
==== Gadong Wet Market ====
The Gadong Wet Market (Malay: Pasar Gadong) is one of the main marketplaces in the city selling fresh meat and produce. The wet market becomes a flower market on Friday and Sunday mornings (pasar bunga). The market is open from 6 am to 3 pm on Monday through Thursday, on Saturday, and on Sunday. On Friday, it is open from 6 am to noon and from 2 pm to 3 pm.

Following concerns from sellers, the Municipal Board has promised to address hygiene issues at the wet market. According to Ali Matyassin, acting chairman of the Bandar Seri Begawan Municipal Board, the market's problems, such as rat infestation, slick floors, and inadequate lighting, are being addressed in both the short- and long-term by his department. He stated in an interview on 31 October 2016 that the department will install rat traps as a temporary solution to lower the rodent population. The department will hire pest control specialists to come up with a long-term solution to the rat problem.

On 29 October 2021, the wet market was re-opened after restrictions implied by the Ministry of Health (MoH) in its attempt to combat the COVID-19 pandemic was lifted. The sellers and customers of the wet market is required to follow standard operating procedures (SOP). Visitors to the market are required to abide by the MoH's SOPs, which include restricting the number of people accessing the location, submitting to temperature checks, scanning the QR code upon entry and exit, and always donning a face mask. Prior to the opening, the building got a thorough cleaning and disinfection.

==== Gadong Night Market ====
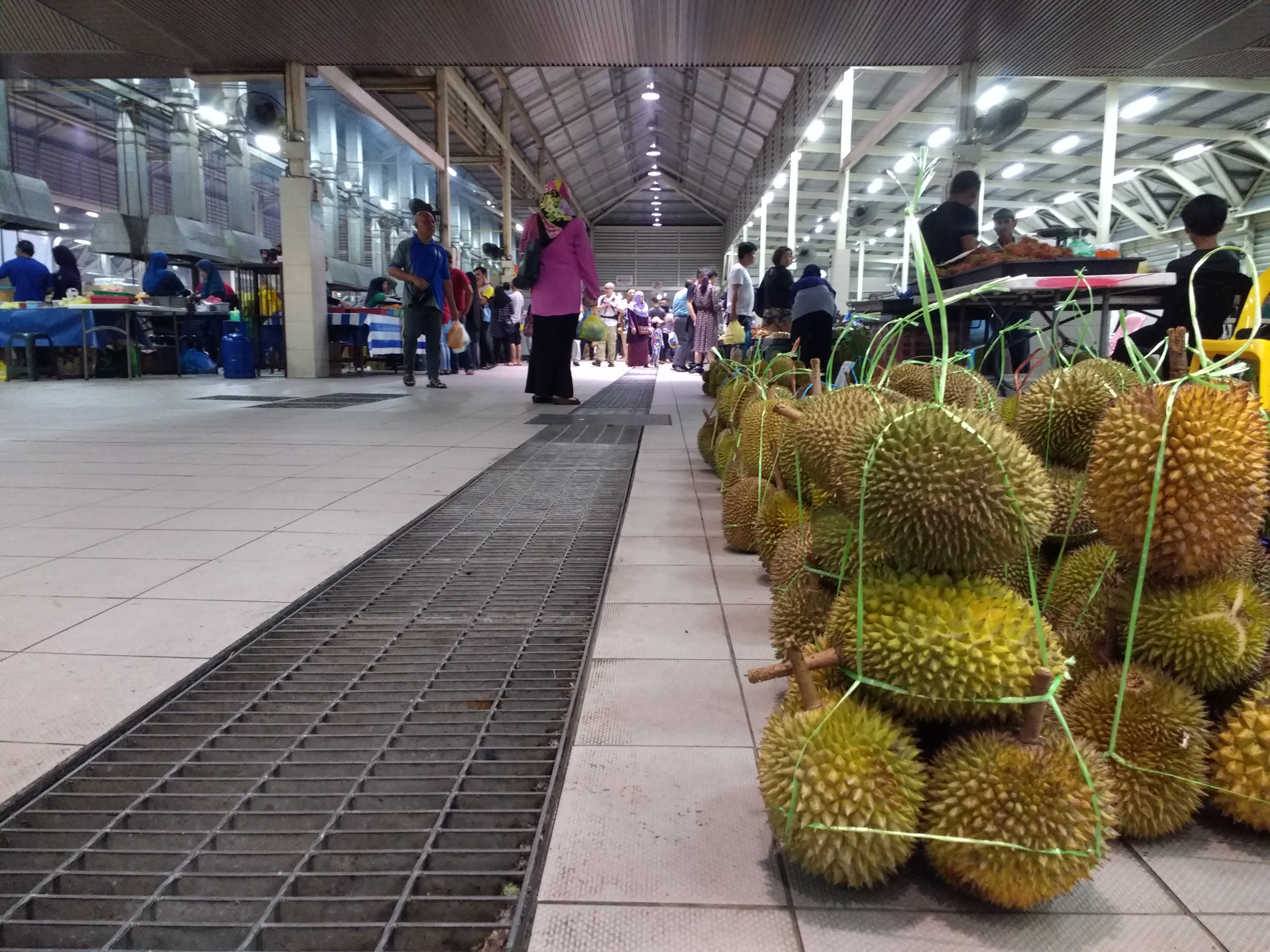
Gadong Night Market

The Gadong Night Market (Taman Pasar Malam Gadong or officially Pasar Pelbagai Barangan Gadong) building covers an area of 5,979.00 square metres or 64,290.00 square feet. Construction began on 9 November 2016 and was completed on 23 December 2016. A total of 150 stalls were allocated according to category, with 16 stalls for grilling and roasting, 81 stalls for cooking, and 39 stalls for vegetables and fruits. A new surau (prayer hall) located next to the market can accommodate around 40 worshippers. The facilities also include toilets for men and women, as well as ablution areas.

The building is open every night from 4 pm to midnight and curates Bruneian cuisine and culture. The night market's main draw is its food, which ranges from regional specialties like kuih malaya, to fruits like durian and jackfruit. Local specialties include roti john, ambuyat, satay, various grilled meats.

Before the market became its current form, vendors and customers maintained a night market for years. The Bruneian government launched an initiative to revamp the night market in the 2010s after seeing the need for improvement. The majority of vendor stalls were covered by tarps before the present building, but the ground and aisles were left open to the weather. Since the market's grand reopening in 2017, it has a solid floor and a roof over it all. Public sinks and other useful amenities were built in close proximity to vendors and lounging places. The market has remained the same despite a change in appearance. The same vendors, customers, and food selections are still available. The market retains a local character because foreigners are not frequently seen in Brunei. Also, there is no need to bring your bartering talents because the cost of food and drinks is set.

There are four extensive rows of vendor stalls dividing the market. A customer may view the entire market from any point in the layout because there are no significant impediments. The night market feels less congested and dirtier than the majority of other sizeable night markets in East Asia as a result of the restoration. The market stalls are divided into sections for meals, snacks, fruits and vegetables, desserts, drinks, and occasionally one or two for apparel.

== Notable people ==
- Datu Ratna Muhammad Jaafar (born 1909)
- Abdul Hapidz (1928–2022), politician and businessman
- Muslim Burut (1943–2021), writer
- Abdul Rahman bin Ibrahim (born 1953), civil servant and politician
