= Kampong Pulaie =

- Village
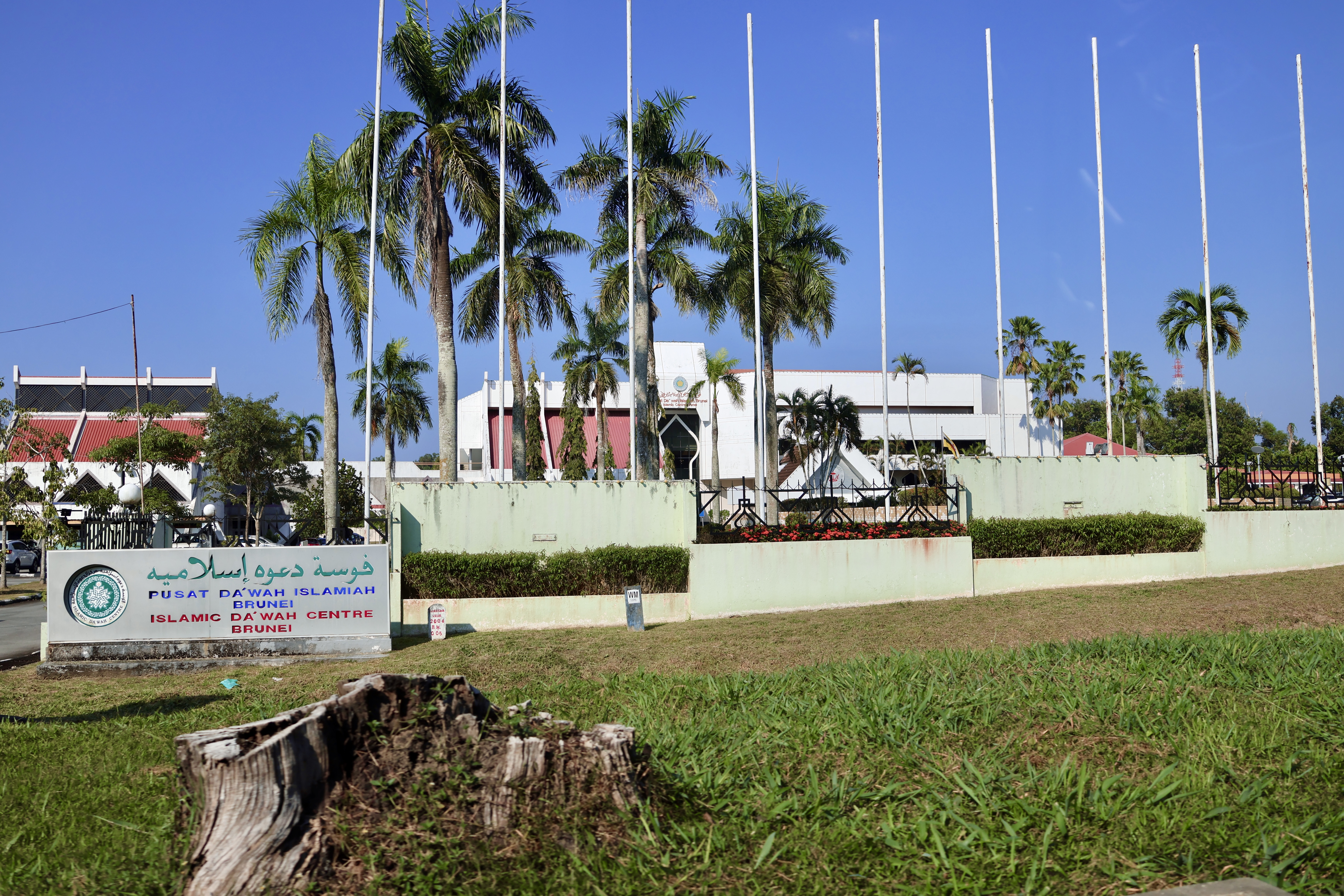
- Islamic Da'wah Centre

- Location in Brunei
- Coordinates: 4°55′57″N 114°57′14″E
- Country: Brunei
- District: Brunei-Muara
- Mukim: Berakas 'A'

Population (2016)
  - Total: 412
- Time zone: UTC+8 (BNT)
- Postcode: BB4313

Kampong Pulaie is a village in Brunei-Muara District, Brunei, and a neighbourhood in the capital Bandar Seri Begawan. The population was 412 in 2016. It is one of the villages within Mukim Berakas 'A'. The postcode is BB4313.

== Etymology ==
The village is named after Pulaie, an obscure and unusual tree.

== Facilities ==
Pulaie Primary School is the village primary school. It also shares grounds with Pulaie Religious School, the village school for the country's Islamic religious primary education.

The village mosque is Kampong Pulaie Mosque; it was inaugurated on 16 January 1987 and can accommodate 1,200 worshippers.
