= Kampong Belimbing =

Village in Brunei

Belimbing
- Village and neighbourhood
- Kampong Belimbing
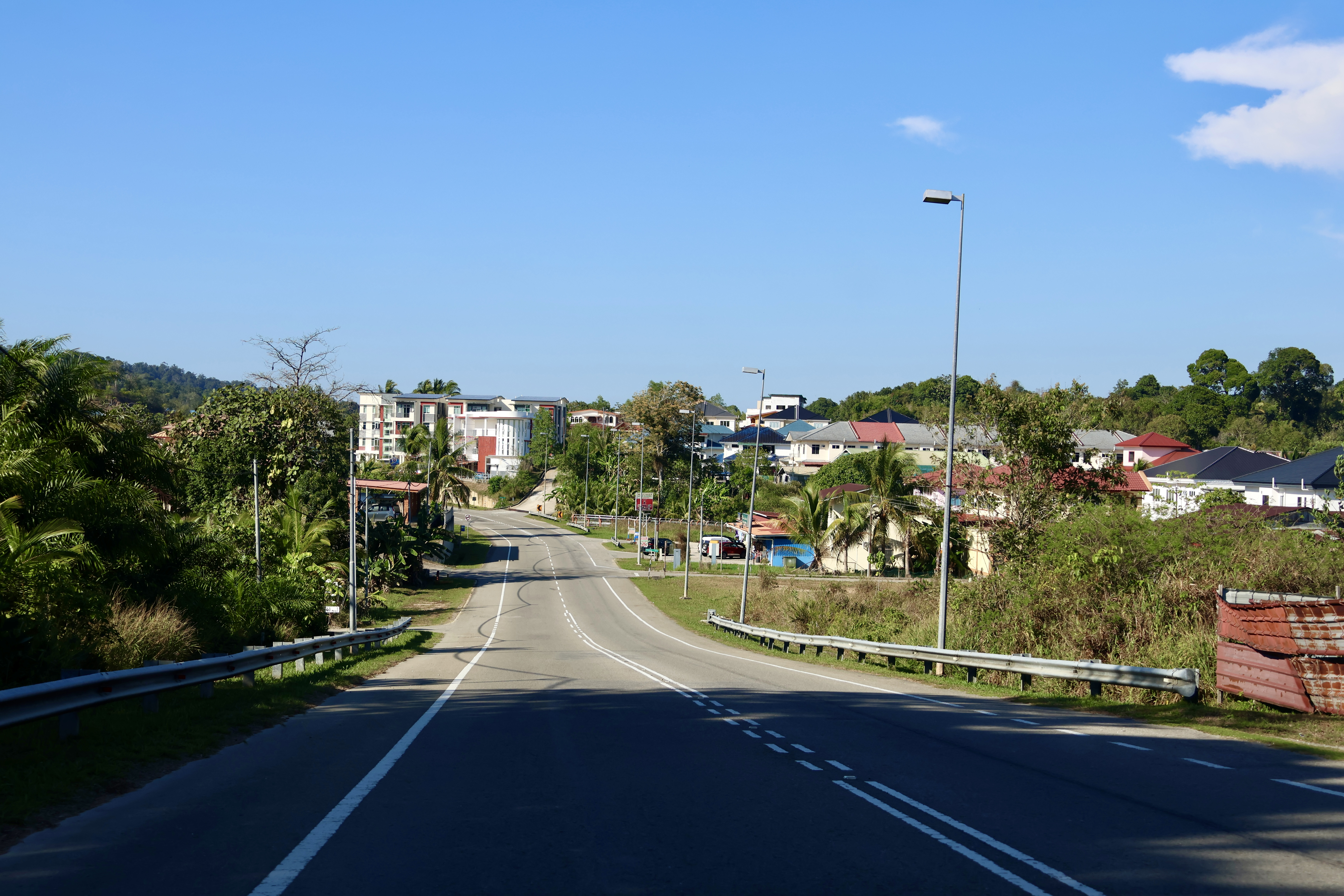
- Jalan Subok
- Motto: Hidup berkampung, bermasyarakat, bernegara, pupuk muafakat membawa berkat, hidup sejahtera
- Location in Brunei
- Coordinates: 4°54′46″N 114°59′00″E
- Country: Brunei
- District: Brunei-Muara
- Mukim: Kota Batu

Government
  - Village head: Daud Jihan

Population (2016)
  - Total: 2,721
- Time zone: UTC+8 (BNT)
- Postcode: BD2917

Kampong Belimbing (Malay: Kampung Belimbing) or silly known as Belimbing, is a village in Brunei-Muara District, Brunei. It is also a neighbourhood in the capital Bandar Seri Begawan. The population was 2,721 in 2016. It is one of the villages within Mukim Kota Batu. The postcode is BD2917.

The village's motto is 'Hidup berkampung, bermasyarakat, bernegara, pupuk muafakat membawa berkat, hidup sejahtera' (Life as a village, a community, a nation, the fertilizer of consensus brings blessings, a prosperous life). Its vision is 'Keluarga riang, masyarakat cemerlang, kampung terbilang' (Joyful families, excellent communities, distinguished villages) and its mission is 'Sentiasa bersiap siaga dalam mendepani berbagai cabaran ke arah kesempurnaan masyarakat' (Always be ready to face various challenges towards the perfection of society). Maju Kampungku, Kampung Belimbing is the village anthem.

== Name ==
Belimbing (Averrhoa bilimbi) is a large tree with a girth of about four pemalums, this fruit is light brown like a tampoi fruit and is similar in shape to a belimbing buluh and is twisted around it. The tree is very odd because it is scaly, where at one time in the past, in a village only one tree grew, making the villagers agree to name the village as 'Kampung Belimbing'.

== Geography ==
Kampong Belimbing is a village contained in Mukim Kota Batu. This village is included in the Bandar Seri Begawan area and is located 5.5 kilometers from the city. To visit this village, we can go through Jalan Subok and also Jalan Kebangsaan/Sungai Akar. This village is bordered by Kampong Sungai Akar in the North, Kampong Sungai Belukut, Kampong Serdang and Kampong Sungai Matan in the East, while Kampong Subok in the South.

== Economy ==
Kampong Belimbing hasn't had a distinct product under the One Village, One Product (1K1P) initiative. Awang Haji Gapor claims that Kampung Belimbing is persistent in its efforts to promote the goods made by the people and draw attention to them. The locals also develop handicrafts, weaving, top-making, kelulut honey, and other things. Products that garnered positive feedback from both locals and visitors were shown in expos organized by the District Department of the Ministry of Home Affairs in addition to being put in a number of specified places.

== Infrastructure ==
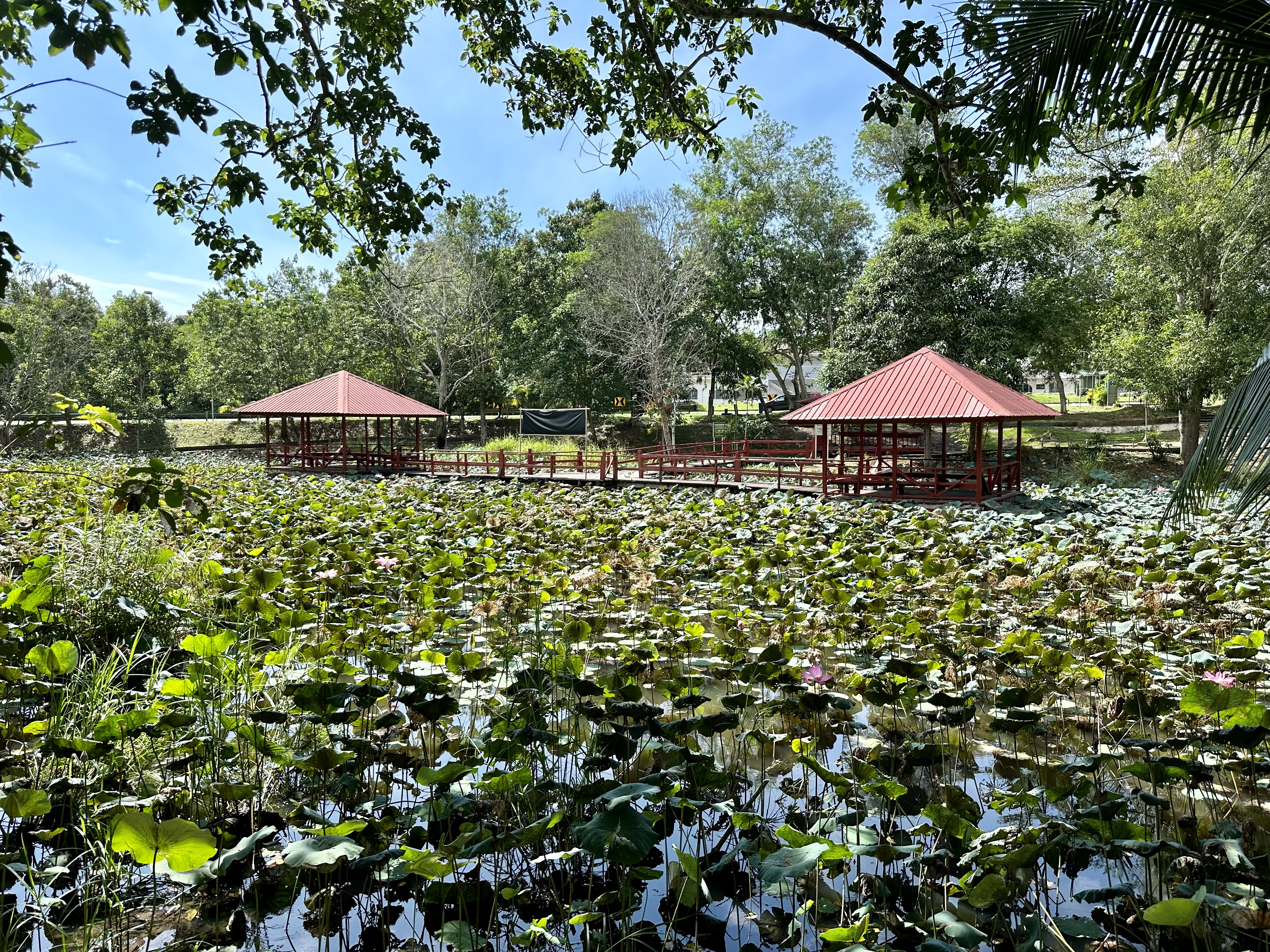
Tasik Sarubing Recreational Park

Kampong Belimbing, like other villages in the country, is not left behind in receiving basic facilities provided by the government such as mosques, roads, water and electricity supplies and telephones.

=== Recreation ===
Bukit Markuching Recreational Park is located on Jalan Subok. Earliest settlers found that the quickest way to get to the Berakas or Bandar region was to cross the Bukit Markuching. The people would go up and bring food with them because the journey up and down the hill would take a while. Therefore, they often eat the snacks they brought with them when taking breaks. Several wild cats who resided in the hill were drawn by leftovers that are often thrown away. Kuching became Bukit Markuching as a result.

Tasik Sarubing Recreational Park is a lake with wooden walkways, and shaded huts. The park also serves as an endpoint to a 2-hour hiking trail connected to Tasek Lama Recreational Park. Tasik Sarubing was inaugurated by the Minister of Home Affairs, Pehin Badaruddin on 14 January 2011. It is located in front of Kampung Belimbing Clinic, covering an area of 15 acres and having a jogging path of 450 meters. The jogging track between Bukit Markucing Recreation Park and Tasik Sarubing Recreation Park has been put together with a distance of four tenths of seven kilometers (round trip). This jogging track has also been penetrated from Taman Riadah Tasik Sarubing to Taman Tasek Lama with a distance of approximately eight to nine kilometers.
