= Kampong Sungai Matan =

Village in Brunei

Sungai Matan Kampung Sungai Matan
- Village
- Kampong Sungai Matan
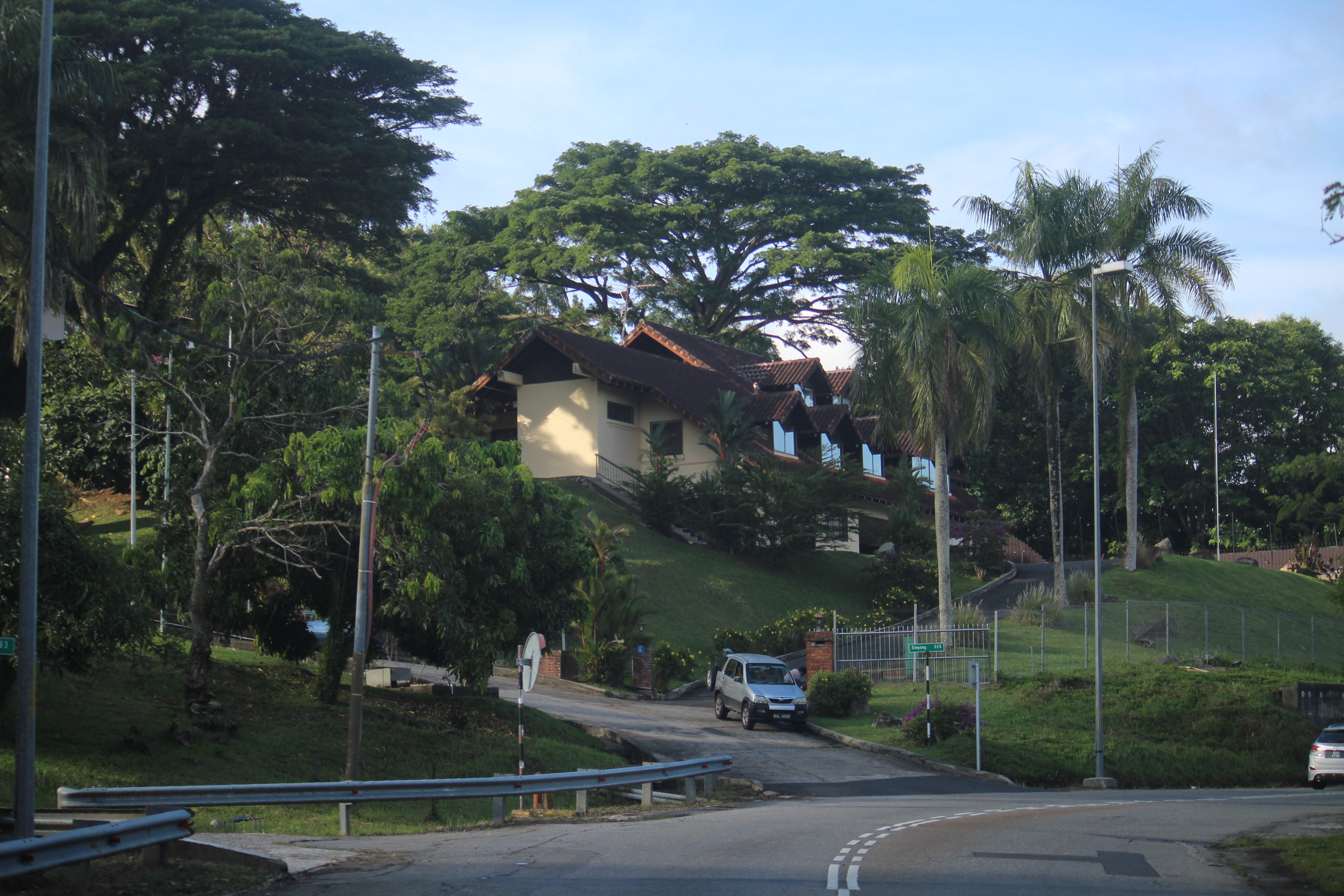

- Location in Brunei
- Coordinates: 4°53′57″N 114°59′14″E
- Country: Brunei
- District: Brunei-Muara
- Mukim: Kota Batu

Government
  - Village head: Hanipah Junit

Area
  - Total: 0.36 km^{2} (0.14 sq mi)

Population (2016)
  - Total: 356
  - Density: 990/km^{2} (2,600/sq mi)
- Time zone: UTC+8 (BNT)
- Postcode: BD1917

Kampong Sungai Matan (Malay: Kampung Sungai Matan) or simply known as Sungai Matan, is a village in Brunei-Muara District, Brunei. It has an area of 0.36 square kilometres (89 acres); the population was 356 in 2016. It is one of the villages within Mukim Kota Batu. The postcode is BD1917. It is a cultural village in this country that is run by members of the Majlis Perundingan Kampung (MPK) with a focus on helping to advance programs and the villagers in matters of tourism and the economy.

== Name ==
According to history and folktales, Kampong Sungai Matan was previously known as Kampong Pengkalan Gua since the residents of Kampong Belimbing will also sell their crops to Kampong Sungai Matan. They would gather at Pengkalan Gua while selling their crops. Pengkalan Gua is located right on the border of Kampung Dato Gandi (Tanjung Gua) and there is a river there. At the head of the river there is a large matan tree (Randia macrophylla). This tree always bears heavy and sweet fruit. When the fruiting season, ripe matan fruit will fall into the river and be carried by the current to the mouth of the river. So this is where the villagers will pick and pick the fruit before the current takes it upstream. So in conjunction with the matan fruit trees and the river, this village is called Kampong Sungai Matan by its residents to this day.

== Geography ==
Kampong Sungai Matan is one of the villages included in Mukim Kota Batu. This village is a village built between half water and half land located on the edge of the Brunei River. The distance between Bandar Seri Begawan is 8 kilometers and the area of the village is 0.36 square kilometers. The village that is 'flanked' by Kampong Dato Gandi and Kampong Serdang can be visited by road or river. And according to the order of the houses built along the banks of the Brunei River towards the mangrove forest located on Berambang Island.

== History ==
Form the 1960s until the 1980s, Kampong Sungai Matan was famous for the various 'cottage' enterprises that were established by the villagers, the most notable example being the Tahai fish-cooking enterprise (no longer in practice). Making belacan, salted fish, making dried prawns, making boats and making traditional foods such as Kuih Ardam, Cincin, Madu Kesirat, Tapai and others. The basis of the daily life needs of this village has made it a destination and one of the centers for the 'pangalu' to exchange goods mostly from Kampong Belimbing and Subok.

== Economy ==
The villagers have provided various activities for visitors to experience the daily life of the villagers themselves or simply rest along the boardwalk (pail). Visitors also have the opportunity to feed the fish along the floating fish cages or participate in cultural performances by local villages. In addition, visitors will also have the opportunity to experience fishing activities using various traditional methods such as nets, crab traps and others. Various daily activities of the villagers are also held such as producing local products such as processing dried shrimp, dried anchovies, shrimp crackers, making sweets and others. Visitors will also be given the opportunity to learn to make handicrafts using recycled materials. Additionally, walks through the forest up Bukit Matan (Matan Hill) to see the natural wildlife and forest herbs that are available. In addition, Inap Desa activities are also provided for visitors to the village, including riding a traditional boat known as 'Jumpong' and paddling along the mangrove forest to catch crabs and to see the flora and fauna. Visitors will also eat seafood dishes that are caught fresh every day.

== Notable people ==
- Yassin Affandi (1922–2012), politician

== Achievements ==
In 2012, the village won the Bronze Medal of the Excellent Village Award (Anugerah Kampung Cemerlang), a national award which recognises outstanding socioeconomic initiatives by villages in the country.
