= Berambang Island =

Biggest island on the Brunei River

Native name: Pulau Berambang
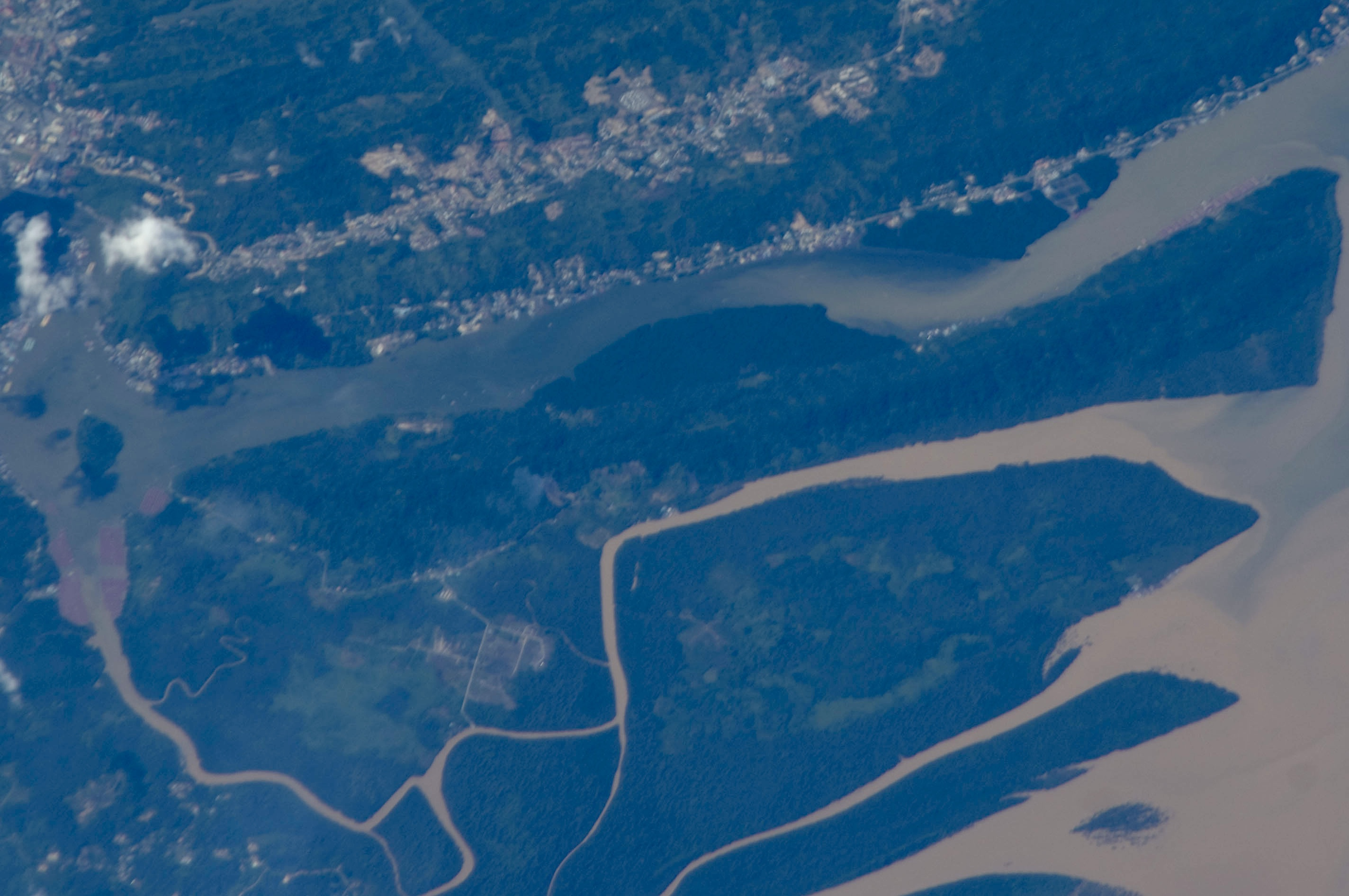
- Berambang Island as seen from the ISS Expedition 22 in 2010

- Location in Brunei

Geography
- Location: Brunei River
- Coordinates: 4.8586390°N 114.9813499°E
- Archipelago: Malay Archipelago
- Area: 1,939 ha (4,790 acres)
- Highest elevation: 157 m (515 ft)

Administration
- Brunei
- District: Brunei–Muara
- Mukim: Kota Batu

Demographics
- Population: 1,243 (2021)

Berambang Island (Malay: Pulau Berambang) is situated along the southern bank of the Brunei River in Mukim Kota Batu, Brunei–Muara District, Brunei. As the largest and most populated of Brunei's islands, it holds both historical and ecological significance. The island is home to Tanjong Kindana, where Sultan Muhammad Hasan once established his palace and tomb at the river's entrance. Today, the mausoleum of Sultan Hasan remains a prominent historical landmark.

== Geography ==
Berambang Island, the largest and most populated of Brunei's islands, spans 1,939 hectares (4,790 acres) and lies within the Brunei River to the east of the mainland. Its northernmost point, Tanjong Kindana (Tanjong Semastra), serves as a key geographical marker for Brunei's eastern approach. This location is distinguished by Bukit Kindana, a 157-metre (515 ft)-high, densely forested hill located about 0.8 miles (1.3 km) southwest of the point, crowned by a distinctive cluster of trees.

The island's extensive mangroves play a crucial role in supporting Brunei's fishing industry by serving as breeding grounds for fish and crustaceans. The western coast is characterised by mangroves dominated by Heritiera globosa and Nypa fruticans, while the eastern coast features Rhizophora species, with Avicennia stands near Sungai Manunggol. Higher elevations on the island are covered by either secondary forest or cultivated lands. Berambang Island also serves as an essential habitat for the endangered proboscis monkey (Nasalis larvatus), which thrives in its expansive, undisturbed mangrove forests. In recognition of its ecological importance, the director of Brunei Museums has proposed designating the island's mangroves as a conservation reserve.

Approximately 575 hectares of Berambang Island consist of mangrove soils, which are grey, clayey, and poorly drained, with potential acid sulfate layers beneath. These soils are periodically flooded during high spring tides, supporting native vegetation dominated by Nypa fruticans. Historically, reclaimed areas of the island have been utilised for the cultivation of rice, rubber, coconuts, and vegetables.

== History ==
Sultan Muhammad Hasan established his palace and tomb at Tanjong Kindana, located at the entrance of the Brunei River. A bridge was constructed under his reign, connecting his palace at Tanjong Kindana to the fortified Chermin Island. While residing at Tanjong Kindana, Sultan Hasan maintained a covered passageway leading to Chermin Island, which served as a defensive stronghold. During his rule or that of his successor, Sultan Abdul Jalilul Akbar, the Spanish reportedly sent an envoy to Brunei. After Sultan Hasan's death in 1598, he was interred in a mausoleum on the island at Kampong Sungai Bunga.

Berambang Island's strategic importance became evident during Sir Charles Brooke's tenure as the Rajah of Sarawak. Brooke's occupation of Berambang Island (Buang Tawer) and acquisition of Kota Batu land, stretching along the Brunei River from the consular boundary to Pelambayan and Serdang, raised concerns. Brooke's coal mining operations on the island led to the discovery of crude oil in 1902, at the foot of the hills near Buang Tawar, with production reaching 5,433 gallons in 1911. This oil was used by the Brooketon and Sadong Coal Mining Company in Muara for mining purposes. A blockhouse built during the coal mining era was later dismantled, and its materials were repurposed to build offices, a police station, and barracks in Muara, as noted in a 1915 annual report. By 1924, the island had produced 3,320 gallons of crude oil.

Berambang Island has been designated a wildlife sanctuary under the Wildlife Protection Act (1978) to conserve its critical mangrove forests and native species. Three areas—Kampong Riong, Kampong Pudak, and Kampong Tanjong Kindana—have been identified as sanctuaries by the Museums Department. These mangroves provide essential habitats for proboscis monkeys and play a vital role in maintaining the ecological balance of the Brunei River system, supporting mainland urban development.

In 1982, the Ministry of Development proposed preserving 721 hectares of mangroves on the island as a conservation area. The Universiti Brunei Darussalam Biology Department later reinforced this recommendation, citing the mangroves' filtration and fisheries-supporting functions. In the 1990s, plans were introduced to establish a 7-square-kilometre (2.7 sq mi) mangrove forest reserve. Berambang Island is also home to Brunei's first commercial fish cage farm, which began operations in the early 1990s. Additionally, under the 2001–2005 National Development Plan, a B$181.5 million housing scheme was proposed, encompassing Kampong Sungai Bunga. In 2001, majority of the buildings are built from concrete, especially on the northern side of the island.

== Administration ==
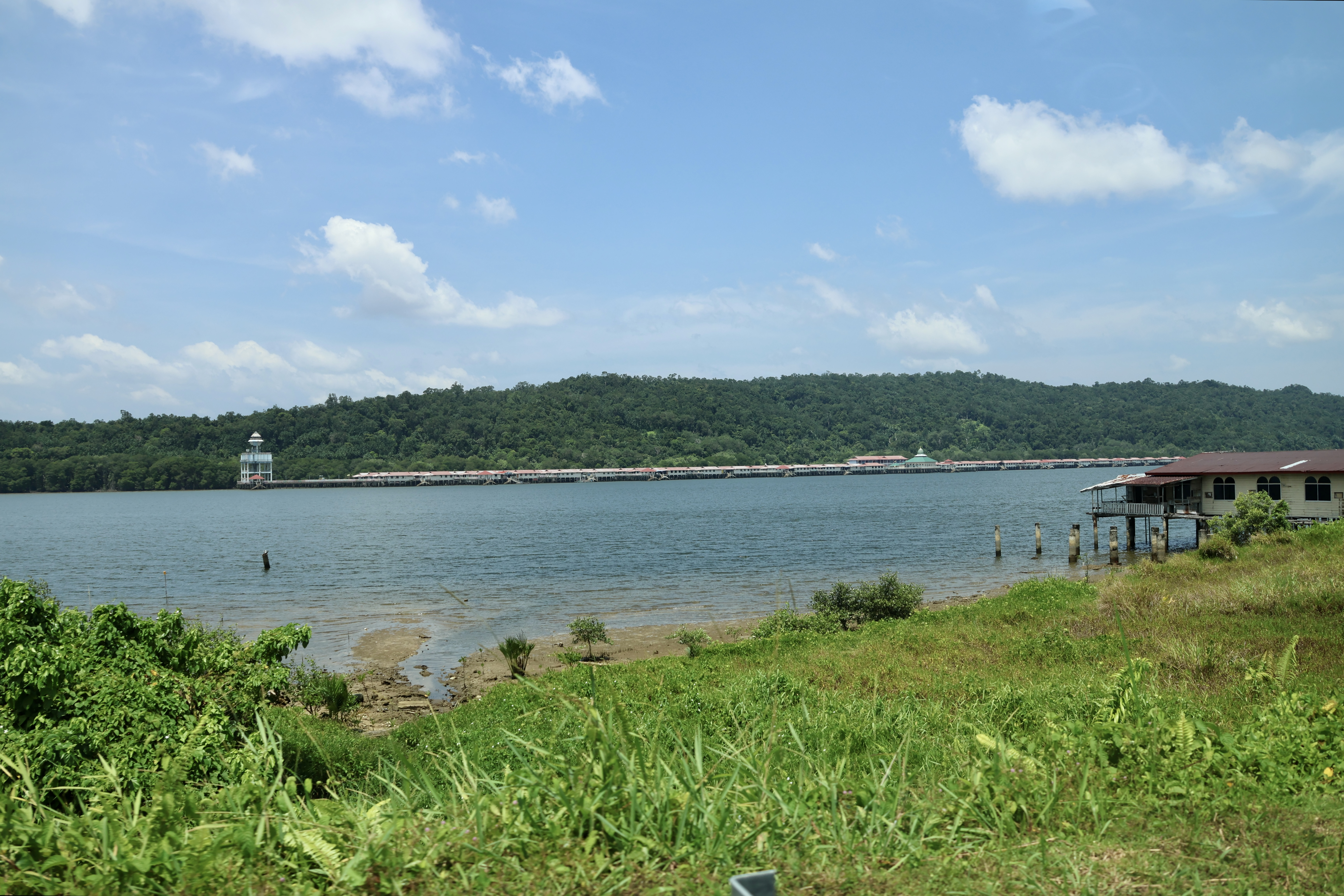
The island seen from Kampong Sungai Besar in 2023

The island contains six villages: Kampong Berambang, Kampong Menunggol, Kampong Riong, Kampong Sungai Bunga, Kampong Pudak, and Kampong Bolkiah 'B'. Additionally, there is a recreational park called Bukit Bujang Pahang Recreational Park. As of 2021, the island comprised the following census villages:

Village	Population (2021)
Kampong Buang Tawar	7
Kampong Riong	17
Kampong Menunggul	369
Kampong Pudak	127
Kampong Tanjong Kindana (Note: Also known as Kampong Sungai Bunga.)	723

== Economy ==
Kampong Sungai Bunga contributes to the island's economy through tourism and seafood production. Its Seri Tanjung Homestay Tourism Centre offers six affordable "Inap Desa" accommodations, allowing visitors to experience water village life, cultural performances, and traditional seafood production. The homestay gained regional recognition by earning the ASEAN Homestay Standard award in 2016. During the COVID-19 pandemic, the initiative shifted its focus to domestic tourism, empowering residents by promoting local culture and traditions, and fostering economic sustainability through services managed by the village consultative council of Sungai Bunga.

== Mythology ==
Batu Gasing Awang Semaun – local legend has it that near Bukit Patoi in Temburong, the legendary warrior Awang Semaun and his nephew, Awang Sinuai, were engaged in a game of gasing (spinning top). When it came Awang Semaun's turn to spin his gasing, it collided with his nephew's and took off from Temburong toward the Brunei River, where it bounced off the seas like a skipping stone and landed upside-down on the shores of Berambang Island, where it spun until it transformed into a large rock.

== See also ==
- List of islands of Brunei
