= Kampong Dato Gandi =

Village in Brunei

Dato Gandi Kampung Dato Gandi
- Village
- Kampong Dato Gandi
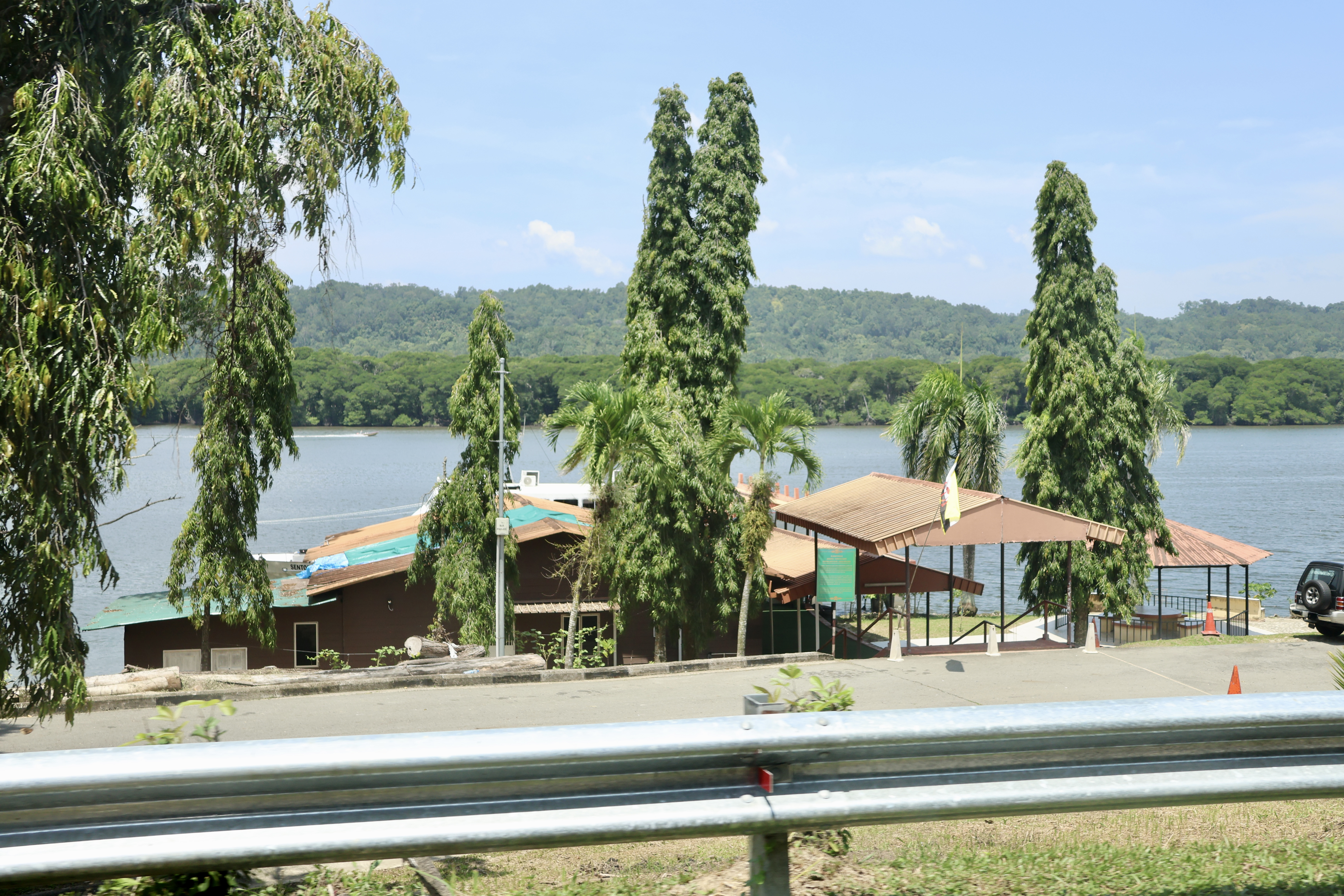
- Queen Elizabeth Jetty

- Location in Brunei
- Coordinates: 4°53′40″N 114°58′50″E
- Country: Brunei
- District: Brunei-Muara
- Mukim: Kota Batu

Government
  - Village head: Hanipah Junit

Population (2016)
  - Total: 424
- Time zone: UTC+8 (BNT)
- Postcode: BD1717

Kampong Dato Gandi (Malay: Kampung Dato Gandi) or commonly known as Dato Gandi, is a village in Brunei-Muara District, Brunei. The population was 424 in 2016. It is one of the villages within Mukim Kota Batu. The postcode is BD1717.

== Etymology ==
Folktales claimed that Dato Gandi was born in Kampong Subok and earned the title of Dato. It was just a title given by the Sultan's grandchildren and his troops; it wasn't a gift. Additionally, he was well-liked and enjoys visiting Kampong Menunggol and it's cape, which are also found in the village. He made a promise to his troops that if he died one day, he wanted to be buried on the cape as he and his men frequently went by it.

Muslim preacher Dato Gandi visited the village and the neighboring areas to give sermons. His people carried out his wishes when he died. The body in the coffin, however, unexpectedly slid and plunged into the Brunei River as they were hoisting it to the cape. None of his men ventured to leap into a river that deep after the unexpected incident. Finally, they made the decision to dig a single hole, bury the body together with all the necessary objects, and then cover the hole with a tombstone. His grave is still cared for today. Despite this no confirmed reports that the grave is visible and close to the Queen Elizabeth Jetty at this time.

== Infrastructure ==
The Queen Elizabeth Jetty or Dato Gandi Jetty was built around 1950. It is located beneath Jalan Kota Batu, in front of the Dato Gandi Primary School. The entire structure is made of concrete. A historic event took place at this jetty: it became the embarkation point for Queen Elizabeth II during her official visit to the country in 1972. In conjunction with the visit, the jetty was constructed and named the Tambatan Queen (Queen's Landing). From this jetty, Elizabeth and the British royal family boarded a special vessel to proceed to the dock in Bandar Seri Begawan. Today, it serves as the arrival point for the MV Sentosa, a furnished boat that takes passengers on a picturesque, two-hour voyage with stunning sunset views down the Brunei River.

Dato Gandi Primary School was the village's only facility to obtain primary education. The school is no longer operational as of today.

The village is also home to the consulate of Belgium.
