= Kota Batu =

Kota Batu may refer to:

== Places ==
- Batu City (Indonesian: Kota Batu), city in East Java, Indonesia
- Kota Batu, Brunei, historical area in Bandar Seri Begawan, Brunei
- Cotabato City (Malay: Kota Batu), city in Maguindanao, Philippines

== Subdivisions ==
- Kota Batu, Brunei-Muara, mukim in Brunei-Muara District, Brunei
- Cotabato, province of Philippines
