= List of islands of Brunei =

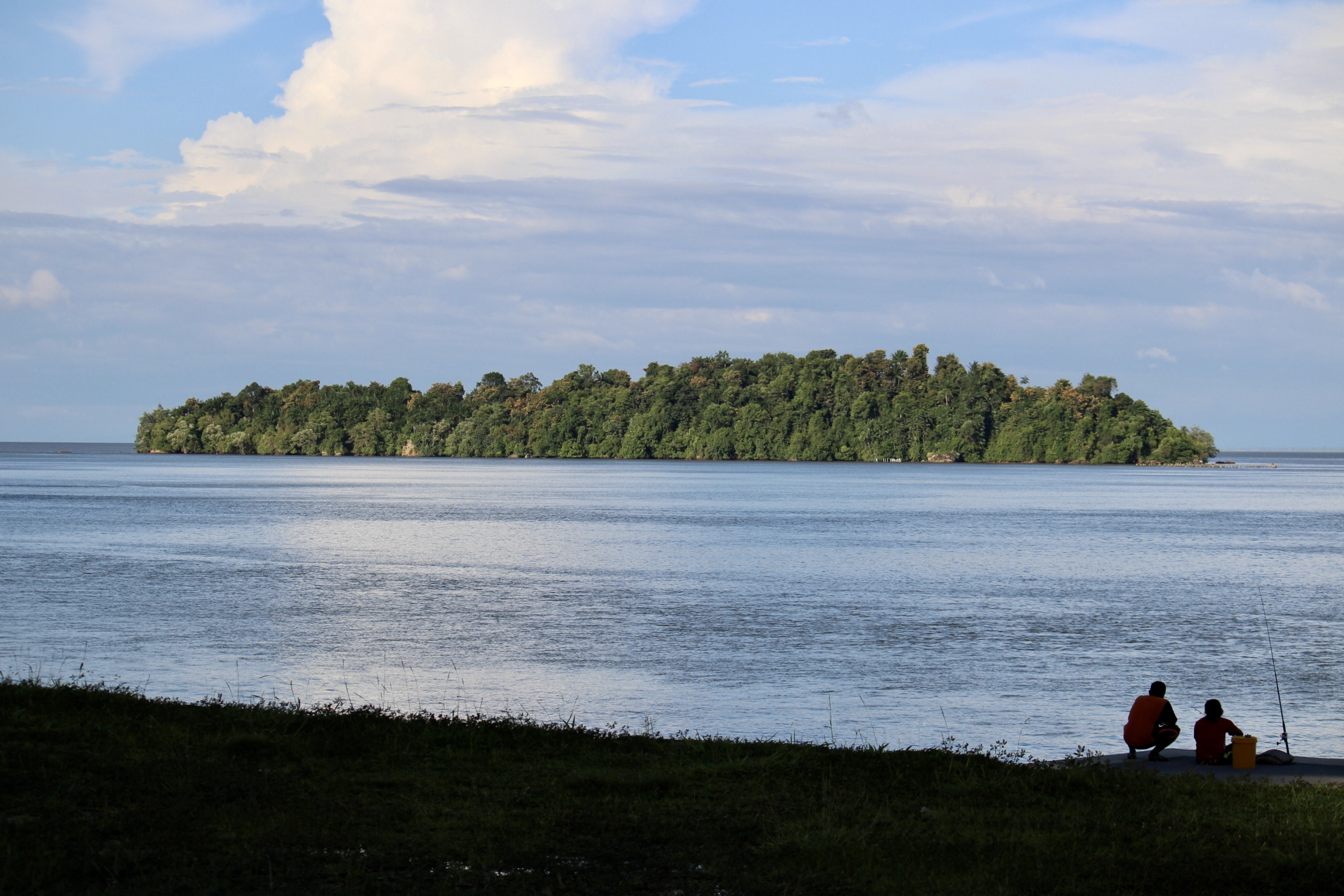
Chermin Island

The following is a list of islands of Brunei. The islands are either located in rivers, South China Sea, Serasa Bay or Brunei Bay.

== List of islands ==
=== Brunei-Muara District ===
==== Mukim Kota Batu ====
- Berambang Island – 4.8586390°N 114.9813499°E
- Chermin Island – 4.9298333°N 115.0249126°E
- Sibungor Island – 4.866435°N 114.954211°E
- Baru-Baru Island – 4.9026739°N 115.0391851°E
- Berbunut Island – 4.8884198°N 115.0391851°E
- Keingaran Island – 4.9474078°N 115.0276930°E
- Pepatan Island – 4.9160717°N 115.0458577°E
- Lumut Lunting – 4.8666667°N 114.9500000°E
- Silipan Island – 4.884951°N 115.043466°E
- Silama Island – 4.882182°N 115.045816°E

==== Mukim Serasa ====
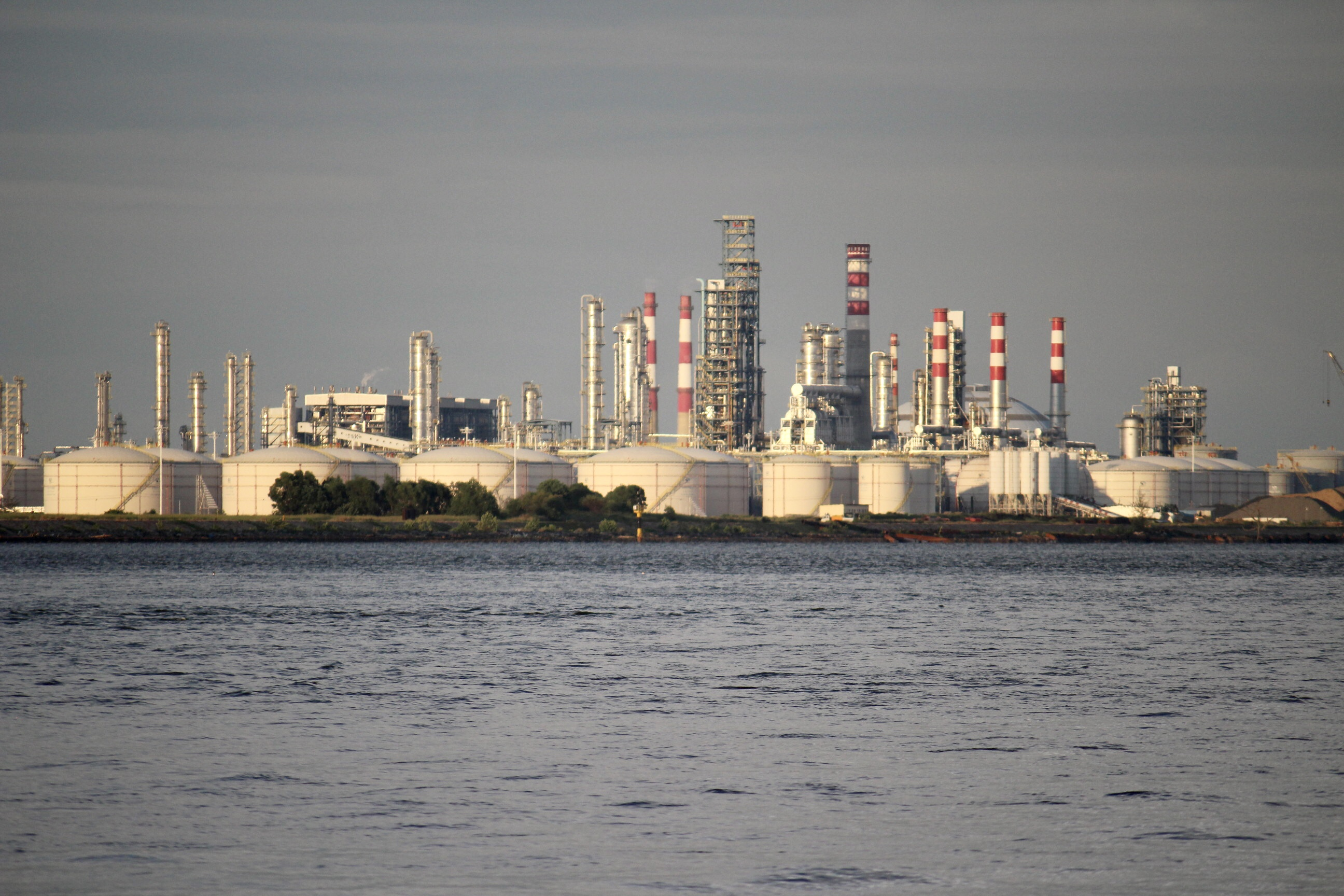
- Muara Besar Island
  Muara Besar Island – 5.0060444°N 115.0999753°E
- Pelumpong Island – 5.0403205°N 115.1104073°E
- Bedukang Island – 4.9784298°N 115.0621680°E

==== Mukim Kilanas ====
- Ranggu Island – 4.8636947°N 114.9131212°E
- Luba Island – 4.8462113°N 114.8890724°E

==== Mukim Mentiri ====
- Si Mangga Besar Island – 4.979955°N 115.044700°E
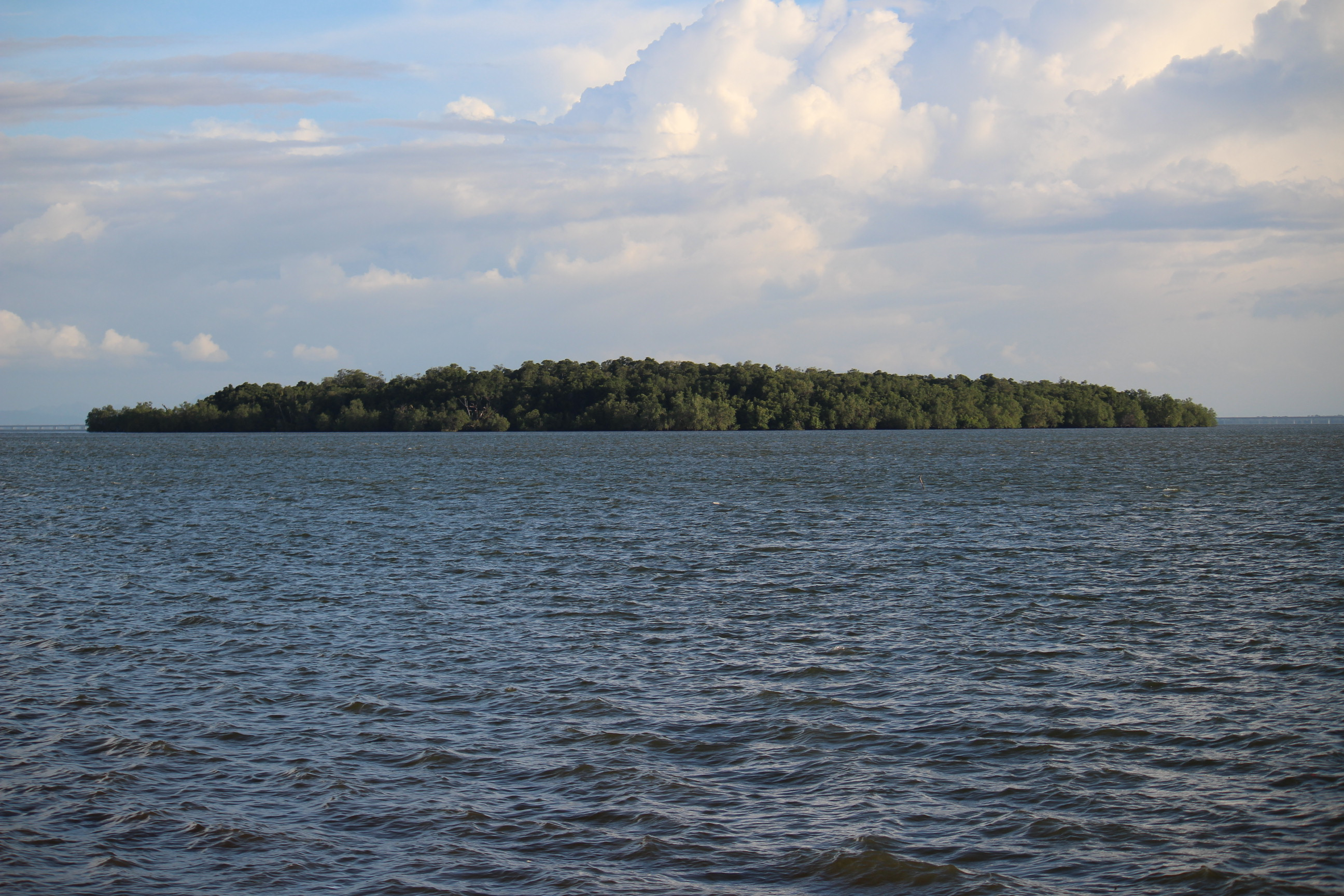
  Bedukang Island
- Si Mangga Damit Island – 4.980997°N 115.040907°E
- Salar Island – 4.999377°N 115.041498°E
- Pasir Tengah Island – 4.997068°N 115.042268°E

==== Other islands ====
- Pelong Rocks – 5.0789126°N 115.0528082°E
- Punyit – 4.983333°N 114.833056°E

=== Temburong District ===
==== Mukim Labu ====
- Selirong Island – 4.8818999°N 115.1298164°E
- Siarau Island – 4.809725°N 115.044236°E
- Kitang Island – 4.876858°N 115.098646°E
- Selanjak Island – 4.824113°N 115.066191°E
- Tarap Island – 4.832289°N 115.070588°E
- Pituat Island – 4.775267°N 115.074091°E

==== Mukim Bangar ====
- Kibi Island – 4.761221°N 115.039218°E

==== Mukim Amo ====
- Batu Mas Island – 4.620348°N 115.108267°E
- Langsat Island – 4.619994°N 115.106958°E
- Amo Island

=== Tutong District ===
==== Mukim Pekan Tutong ====
- Setawat Island – 4.774002°N 114.606441°E
- Bakuku Island – 4.786662°N 114.626073°E

==== Mukim Tanjong Maya ====
- Tanjong Maya Island – 4.757298°N 114.663657°E

==== Other ====
- Louisa Reef (Spratly Islands)

== See also ==
- Geography of Brunei
- List of islands
