= Sibungor Island =

Islet in the Brunei River

Native name: Pulau Sibungor
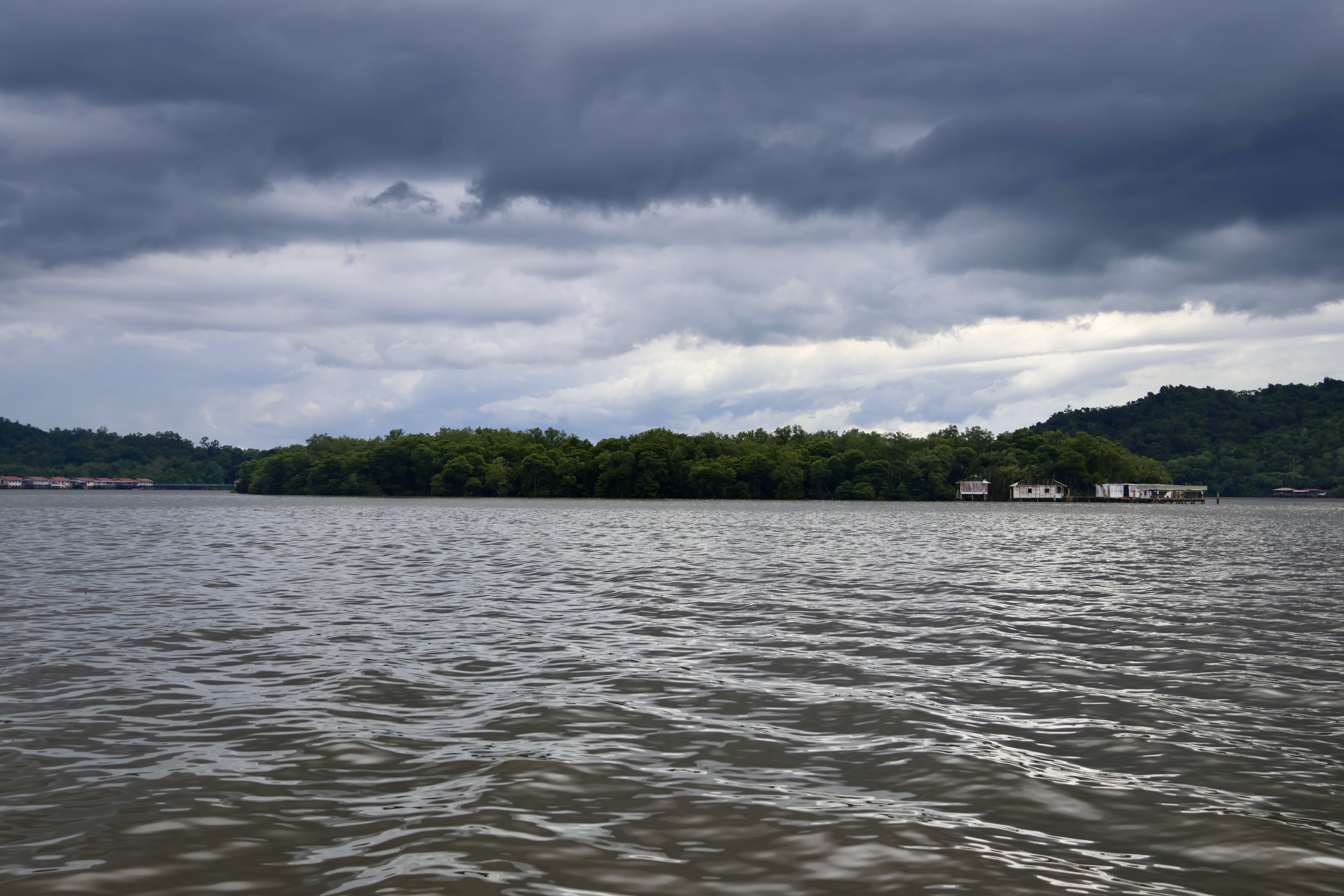
- The island in 2025

- Location in Brunei

Geography
- Location: Brunei River
- Coordinates: 4.866435°N 114.954211°E
- Archipelago: Malay Archipelago
- Area: 8 ha (20 acres)

Administration
- Brunei
- District: Brunei–Muara
- Mukim: Kota Batu

Demographics
- Population: 0

Sibungor Island (Malay: Pulau Sibungor) is an islet on the Brunei River in Brunei-Muara District, Brunei. A proposal for an 8 hectares (20 acres) protection status to be implemented on the island. The island is home to proboscis monkeys and forest swamps.

== Geography ==
The islet sits at the confluence of the Brunei River and Butir River, with two navigational beacons located westwards. Moreover, an anchorage is also used west of Sibungor.

== History ==
On 8 April 1958, M.S.T. M.L. Eager and the Sarawak government launch Apoh collided in the entrance to Brunei Town, close to Sibungor Island. The Apoh was hit amidships on the port side and suffered serious damage above the waterline. Neither passengers nor crew suffered any injuries or lost their lives.

== Gallery ==
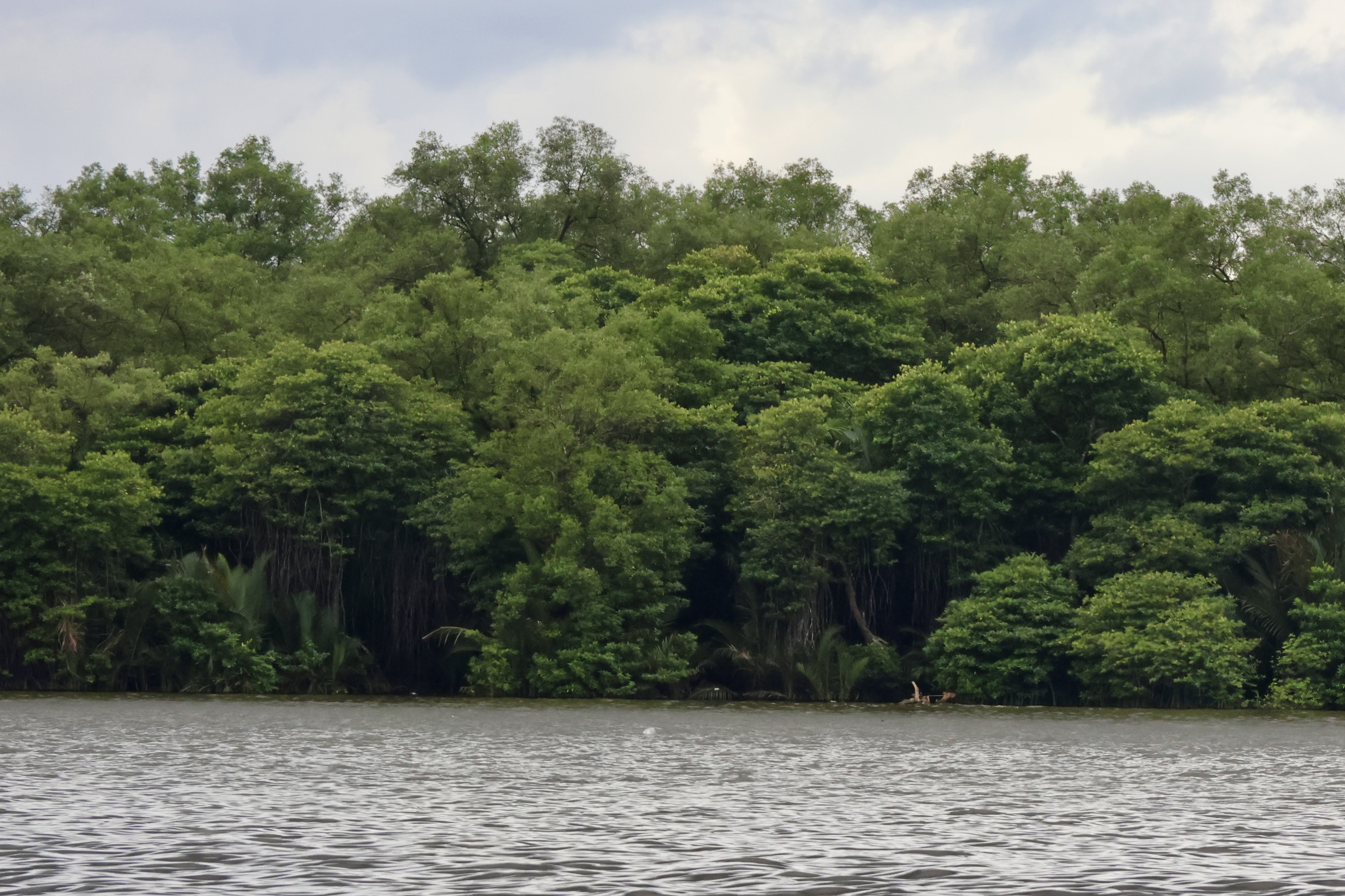
Mangroves on the island

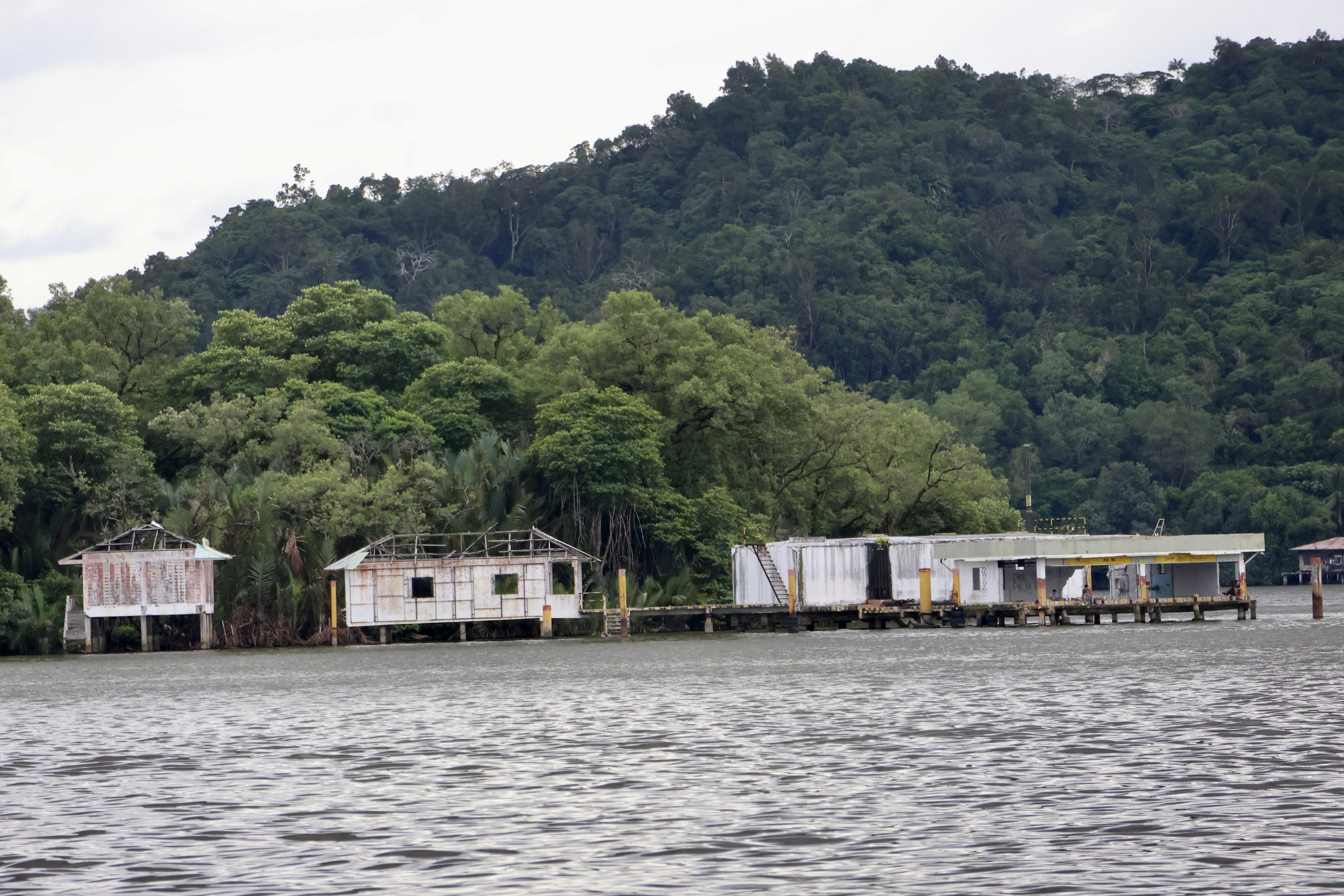
The former fueling station on the island

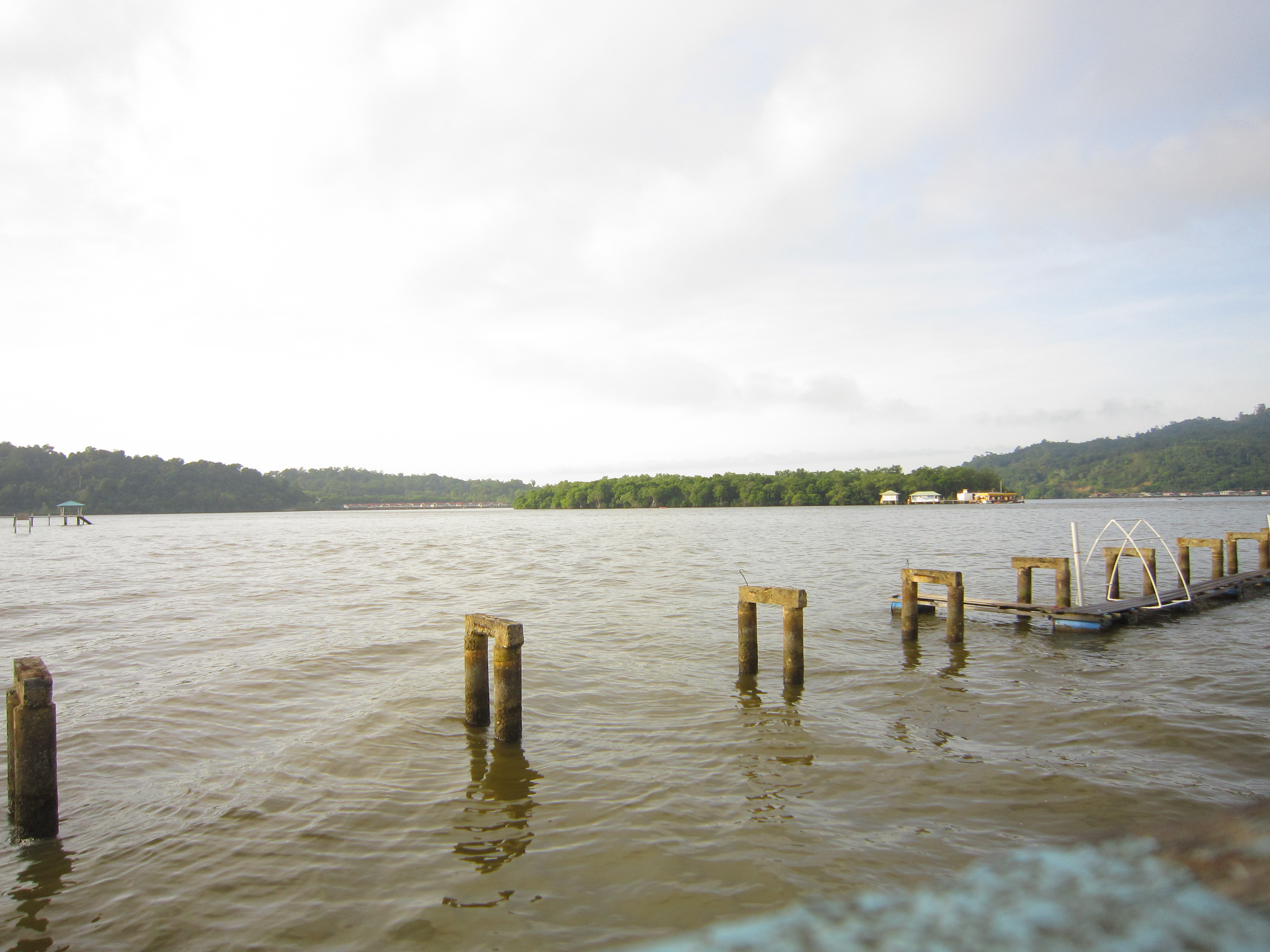
The island in 2011

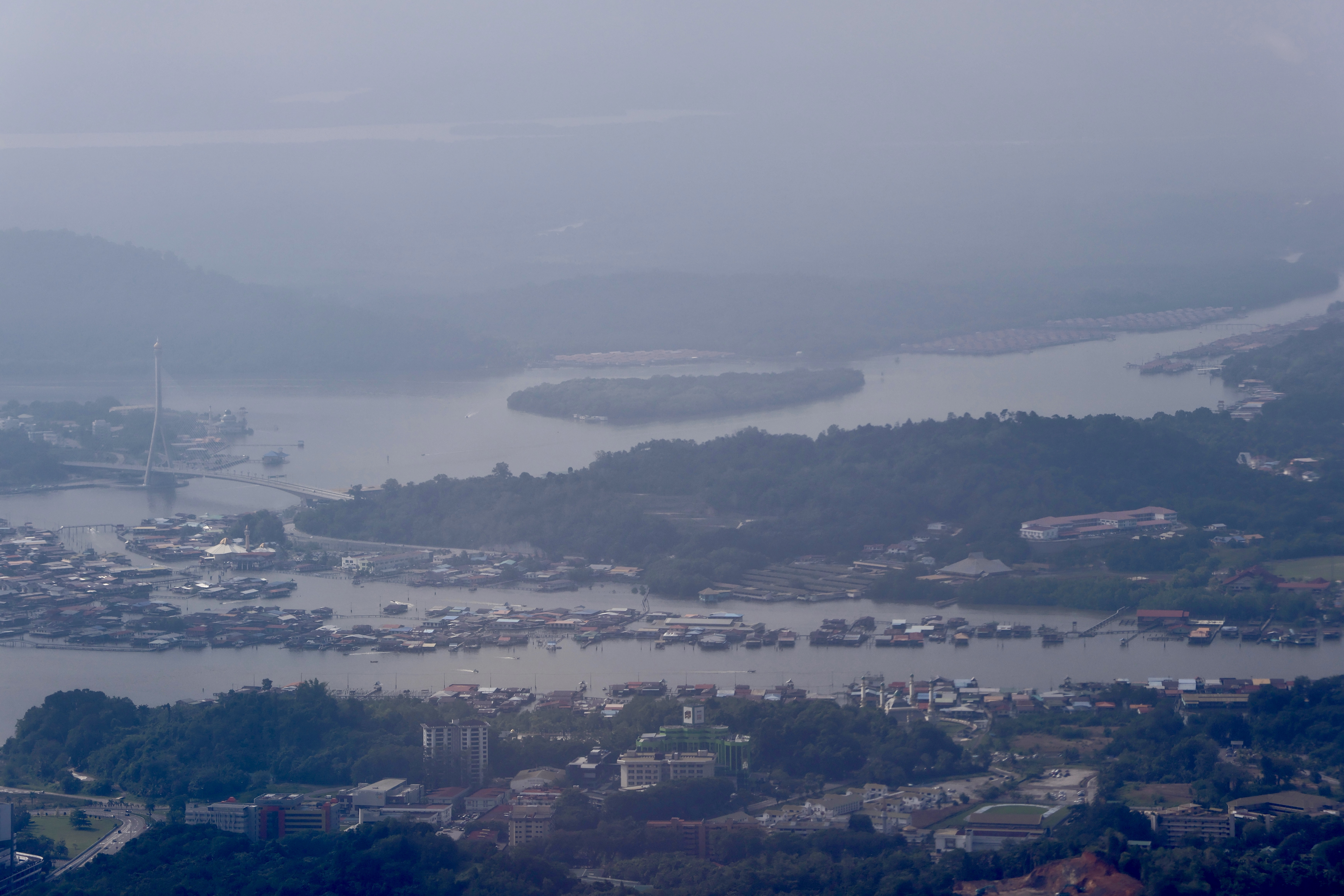
The island seen from a commercial aircraft in 2023

== See also ==
- List of islands of Brunei
