= Kampong Menunggol =

Menunggol
- Village
- Kampong Menunggol
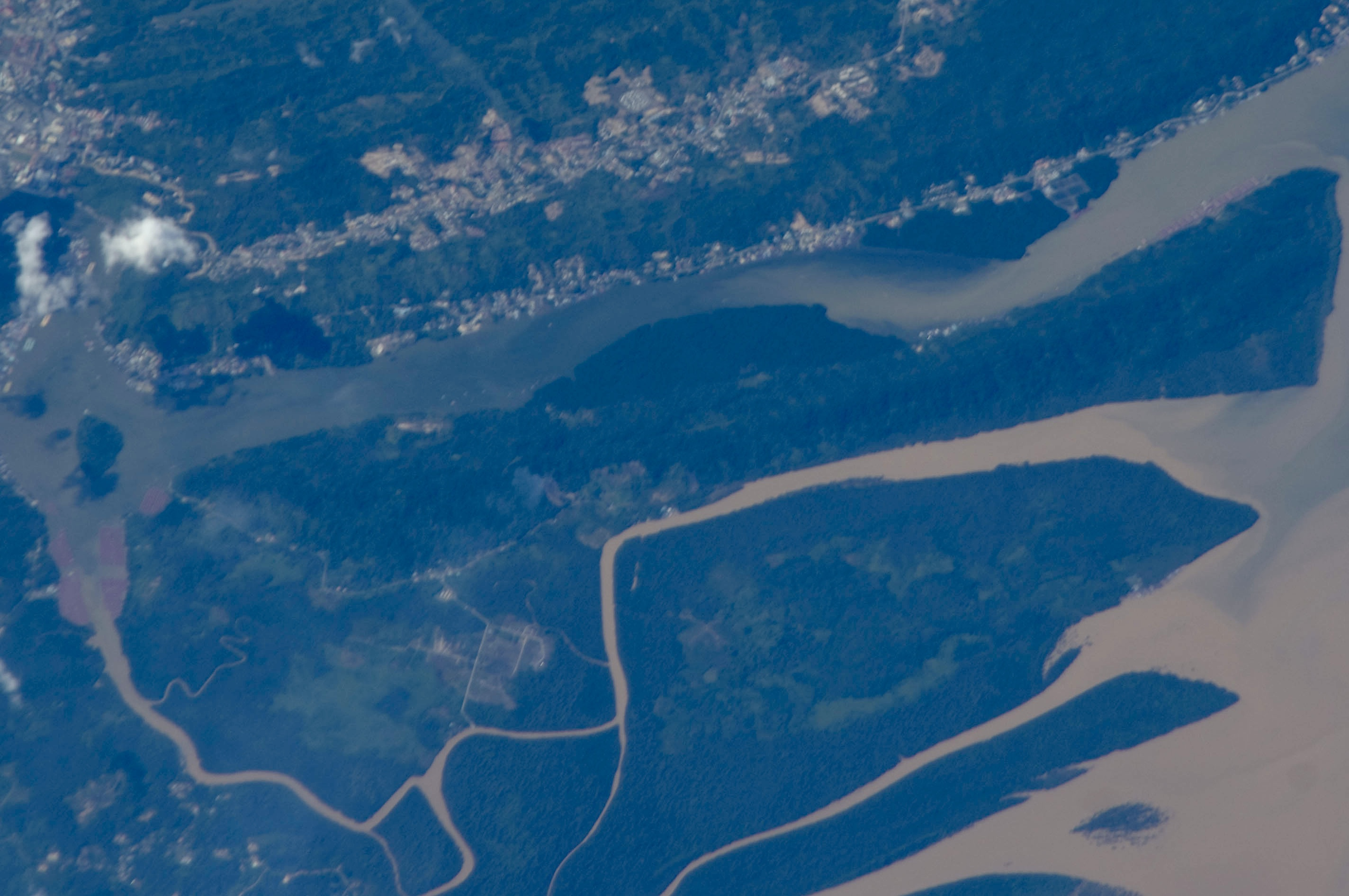
- Menunggol (left) on Berambang Island

- Location in Brunei
- Coordinates: 4°51′49″N 114°58′39″E
- Country: Brunei
- District: Brunei–Muara
- Mukim: Kota Batu

Government
  - Village head: Ibrahim Osman

Area
  - Total: 9.5073 km^{2} (3.6708 sq mi)

Population (2016)
  - Total: 541
  - Density: 56.9/km^{2} (147/sq mi)
- Time zone: UTC+8 (BNT)
- Postcode: BD4317

Kampong Menunggol (Malay: Kampung Menunggol) or simply Menunggol, is a village situated on Berambang Island of Mukim Kota Batu along the banks of the Brunei River, relatively distant from Bandar Seri Begawan, the capital city. Access to the village is primarily via a five-minute boat ride from the Kampong Menunggol jetty to the city centre. The village, which consists of two sections, Menunggol Laut and Menunggol Tengah, covers an area of 9.5 square kilometres and has a population of 548 people, predominantly of Malay descent, specifically from the Kedayan people.

== Etymology ==
Brunei has a few place names that are tree related. According to legend, the name Menunggol derives from Bruneian words for tree stumps known as tunggul. No one really knows where, but tree stumps gave the neighborhood Kampong Menunggol its name. According to sources from the Brunei History Centre, the village existed before the outbreak of the Second World War.

== Geography ==
Kampong Menunggol is a small village located on the banks of the Brunei River and to get there using an outboard motor.

== Administration ==
The establishment of the Majlis Perundingan Kampung (MPK) Menunggol which began in 1993 is intended as a driving force and catalyst to foster good citizenship in support of the leadership of the Sultan of Brunei, to strengthen the effectiveness of the institution of village heads as the core of grassroots leadership and to organize and work on plans for the well-being of the people and the villagers especially for the development and development of the village.

The first village chief of Kampong Menunggol was Kassim bin Khamis, who was appointed by the government of Brunei. In 1965, the position was taken over by Orang Kaya Lela Negara Haji Japar bin Kassim, who was elected by the villagers. The selection of the ketua kampung (village head) was based on leadership qualities and a sense of responsibility towards the community. In the past, the role of the village chief was very important, serving as a religious leader with the authority to arrest and punish offenders, as well as to officiate marriages and select suitable witnesses for wedding ceremonies. The village chief's duties have expanded to include handling community concerns in addition to overseeing the welfare and safety of the residents. The village chief is also in charge of allocating pensions to qualified individuals, including widows, the aged, and those with disabilities. The village chief also gives all the inhabitants the dates that the Sultan has allotted them throughout Ramadan.

The issue of abandoned automobiles in the village was handled on 11 March 2023, by the MPK Menunggol, the Land Transport Department, the Brunei–Muara District Office, and the Royal Brunei Police Force. The head of the village, Haji Ibrahim bin Haji Osman, talked about the repercussions of leaving cars by the side of the road and stressed the value of cleanliness. The categories for designating automobiles as "Non-Used" or "Condemn" were explained to the residents, and they were cautioned that failing to maintain their vehicles might result in fines of at least B$500. Furthermore, information on abandoned cars was gathered at Kampong Menunggol Primary School, where pupils received instruction on upholding sanitation standards in support of the objectives of sustainable development.

== Economy ==
The custom of tapping nipa palms to make gula anau, or palm sugar, has been abandoned in Kampong Menunggol. In the past, Kedayans from the village were important producers and suppliers of gula anau, especially when Brunei was under Japanese occupation. In order to understand the procedure, several locals had even journeyed to Limbang, Sarawak. Cleaning the palm's environs, gonchanging (a method to increase nectar yield), tapping, and cooking were among the steps in the manufacturing process. But as Brunei's oil and gas industry has grown, this custom has declined, and the Kedayan community is no longer a source for staples like gula anau.

To promote development in Kampong Menunggol, a committee has been established to implement the One Village One Product (1K1P) Program, which aims to encourage local communities to become more creative, innovative, independent, resilient, and competitive. This initiative seeks to enhance the economy of the mukim and village by supporting small and medium-sized enterprises (SMEs), contributing to both the national economy and self-sufficiency. Several families in the village are actively engaged in producing various products to improve their livelihoods, including two or three families that specialise in making different types of kelupis, such as pandan leaf kelupis and cored kelupis. Additionally, some families are involved in manufacturing shrimp crackers, which have seen strong demand.

== Demography ==
In 2001, the population of Kampong Menunggol was categorised by ethnicity and gender. The Malay community was the largest, with 273 males and 247 females, totaling 520 individuals. The Chinese population was minimal, and other ethnicities accounted for 11 individuals. In total, Kampong Menunggol had a population of 548, comprising 286 males and 262 females. The Buang Kepayang Muslim Cemetery, located in Menunggol Tengah, and Kampong Menunggol is solely inhabited by Bruneians from the Kedayan.

== Infrastructure ==
The people of Kampong Menunggol get the same benefits as other Bruneians from the government's numerous infrastructure projects, such as roads, schools, power, and water supplies. Telephone service was initially established in Kampong Menunggol in 1986 at the village chief's residence. By 1994, all homes had access to full service. In 1982, medical facilities started their operations. Initially, a health clinic was constructed to cater to the needs of the population, particularly children and expecting women. In case of emergency, patients were sent to larger hospitals located in Bandar Seri Begawan. Around the 1970s, there was also a notable improvement in the housing infrastructure, which reflected the locals' attempts to raise their level of life. Traditional dwellings constructed of bamboo, nipa leaves, palm leaves, and wood gave way to more contemporary buildings made of stone and wood with zinc roofs.

In Kampong Menunggol, a community volunteer project was held on 24 March 2023, to complete the construction of a new wooden bridge that leads to the Islamic Cemetery Menggaris. Cityneon Managing Director Dato' Jack Ting, along with Misle bin Haji Abdul Karim, the Brunei–Muara District Officer, Village Chief Haji Ibrahim bin Haji Osman, members of the mosque committee, and locals, attended the celebration. Donors and private citizens who supplied construction supplies to repair the dilapidated bridge supported the project. The occasion was timed to coincide with the opening of the Kampong Menunggol Gateway, which is situated at the village's entrance and acts as a welcome center and informational resource for guests. One of Kampong Menunggol's most well-liked recreation areas is Bukit Bujang Pahang.

=== Education ===
One of Brunei's oldest schools, Nakhoda Abdul Rashid Primary School was founded in 1961 with community backing. The school's classic wooden building, perched on stilts, is a reflection of rural Bruneian design. It employs 14 instructors who include religious instruction into the curriculum, and it serves 41 pupils. The school has been chosen to participate in a blended learning pilot program, which blends traditional and digital teaching approaches. It also serves as a community centre, promoting connections between students, faculty, and islanders while advancing the intellectual and personal growth of the latter.

=== Mosque ===
Although Kampong Menunggol lacked a mosque or other house of worship, the residents had to paddle from the island to Omar Ali Saifuddien Mosque in Bandar Seri Begawan every Friday prayer. The village chief, Orang Kaya Lela Negara Haji Japar bin Kassim, called a conference in early 1969 to discuss establishing a place of worship close to his house because of the growing population and the distance. On a 0.75 acres (0.30 ha) area of land about 10 kilometers from Bandar Seri Begawan, the government of Brunei started work on the Kampong Menunggol Mosque in 1979. The 300 worshipers may be accommodated in the mosque, which is made of wood, cement, and concrete pillars. It has basic amenities including toilets, air conditioning, and locations for ablution. Beginning in the 1970s, the government built more infrastructure, including as roads, water supplies, and power, in addition to the mosque.

=== Places of interest ===
Kampong Menunggol is home to several historical sites, including Batu Nakhoda Abdul Rashid, Bukit Batu Bujang Pahang, Bukit Batu Berpangkat, Bukit Batu Seri Baya, and Bukit Batu Narkuning. Batu Nakhoda Abdul Rashid is said to be a stone that appears when someone is lost in the forest, based on an oral tradition. Bukit Batu Bujang Pahang tells the story of a bachelor hunter who consumed a fruit called pengalaban, leading to the hill's name. Another version attributes the name to a local resident who fell ill. Bukit Batu Narkuning is believed to be named after a phenomenon that occurs at Maghrib, where something resembling a cloth appears on the hill at dusk, as recounted by local elders. According to the village chief, Bujang Batu Bujang Pahang was once used as a coal mining site in ancient times.
