= Kampong Pelambayan =

Village in Brunei

Pelambayan Kampung Pelambayan
- Village and neighbourhood
- Kampong Pelambayan
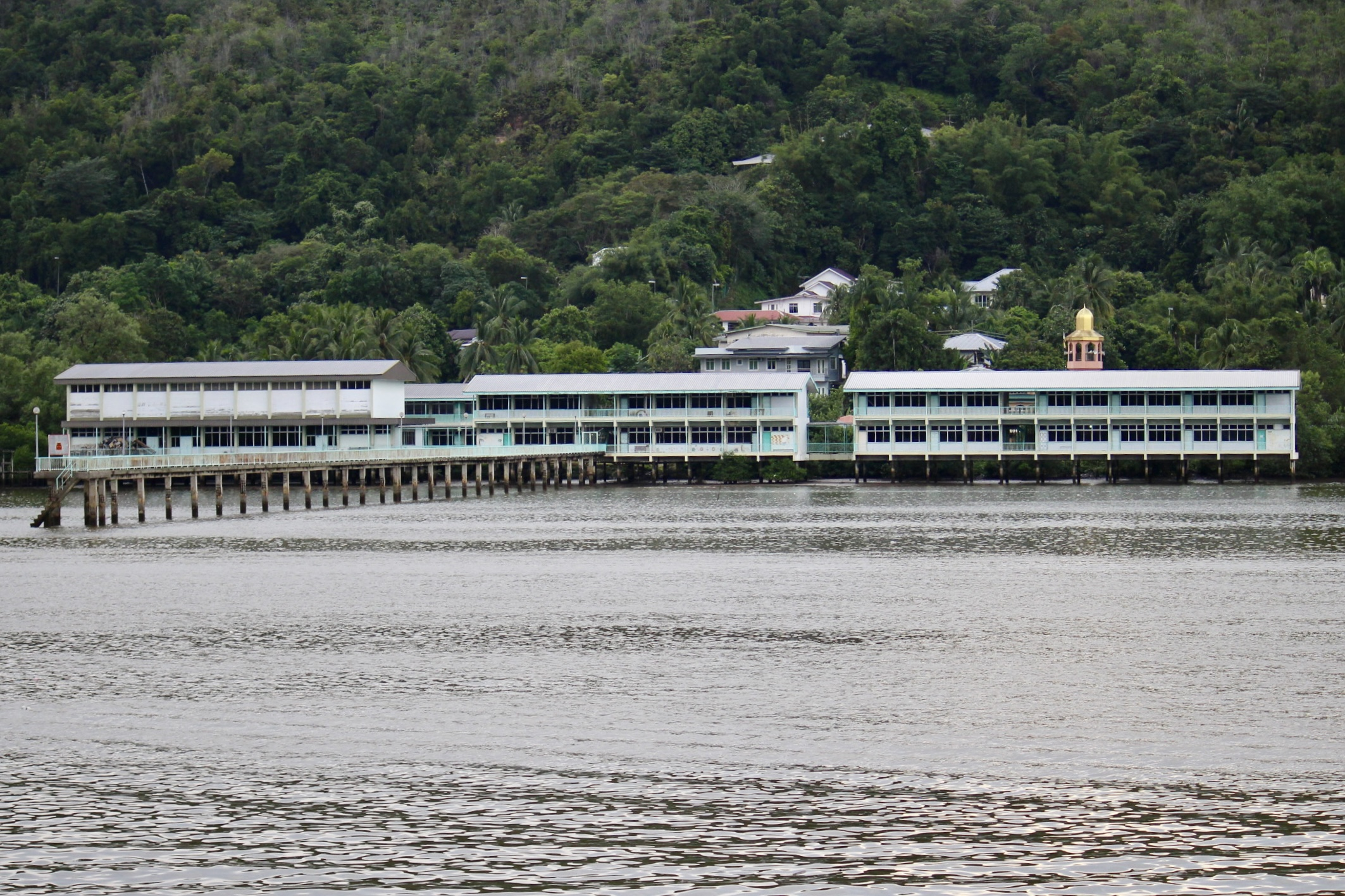
- Pelambayan Religious School

- Location in Brunei
- Coordinates: 4°53′18″N 114°58′26″E
- Country: Brunei
- District: Brunei-Muara
- Mukim: Kota Batu

Government
  - Village head: Hanipah Junit

Area
  - Total: 0.5924 km^{2} (0.2287 sq mi)

Population (2016)
  - Total: 714
  - Density: 1,210/km^{2} (3,120/sq mi)
- Time zone: UTC+8 (BNT)
- Postcode: BD2317

Kampong Pelambayan (Malay: Kampung Pelambayan; also Kampong Pelambaian) or simply known as Pelambayan. is a village in Brunei-Muara District, Brunei. It is also a neighbourhood in the country's capital Bandar Seri Begawan. The population was 714 in 2016. It is one of the villages within Mukim Kota Batu. The postcode is BD2317.

== Name ==
According to folktales, the original name of this village is from the word 'melimbai' which means a boat when paddled, either at high tide or low tide then the boat will float to the side due to the resistance of the strong water. The villagers who live on the banks of the Brunei River when going back and forth from the city, the boat they are on will float into the sea when they hit a strong current. From that incident, the word 'Pelambaian' was revealed and finally the village was called Kampung Pelambayan.

== Demography ==
As of 2017, a total of 792 villagers reside in the village. The residents of Kampung Pelambayan built houses on the banks of the Brunei River and some on land separated by Jalan Kota Batu.

== Economy ==
Kampong Pelambayan products through the Majlis Perundingan Kampung (MPK) play an active role in mobilizing programs in the economic field to support the realization of One Village One Product (1K1P) Program. As a grassroots and community movement body, MPK Pelambayan as a supporter and pillar of this institution has been able to stimulate towards efforts to generate the village economy. Among the products actively developed by Kampong Pelambayan is the Hadrah Service. The Hadrah MPK Pelambayan Team consists of 20 youths and was established on 1 October 2010. In addition to this, the people of this village are actively working on the manufacture of various types of traditional and modern confectionery which are made by private people such as tart, penyaram, pulut panggang, curry paste and tapai.

== Infrastructure ==
Pelambayan Religious School is the village's government school for the country's Islamic religious primary education.

The village mosque is Kampong Pelambayan Mosque; it was inaugurated on 20 April 1984 and can accommodate 600 worshippers.
