= Kampong Sungai Besar =

Sungai Besar Kampung Sungai Besar
- Village
- Kampong Sungai Besar
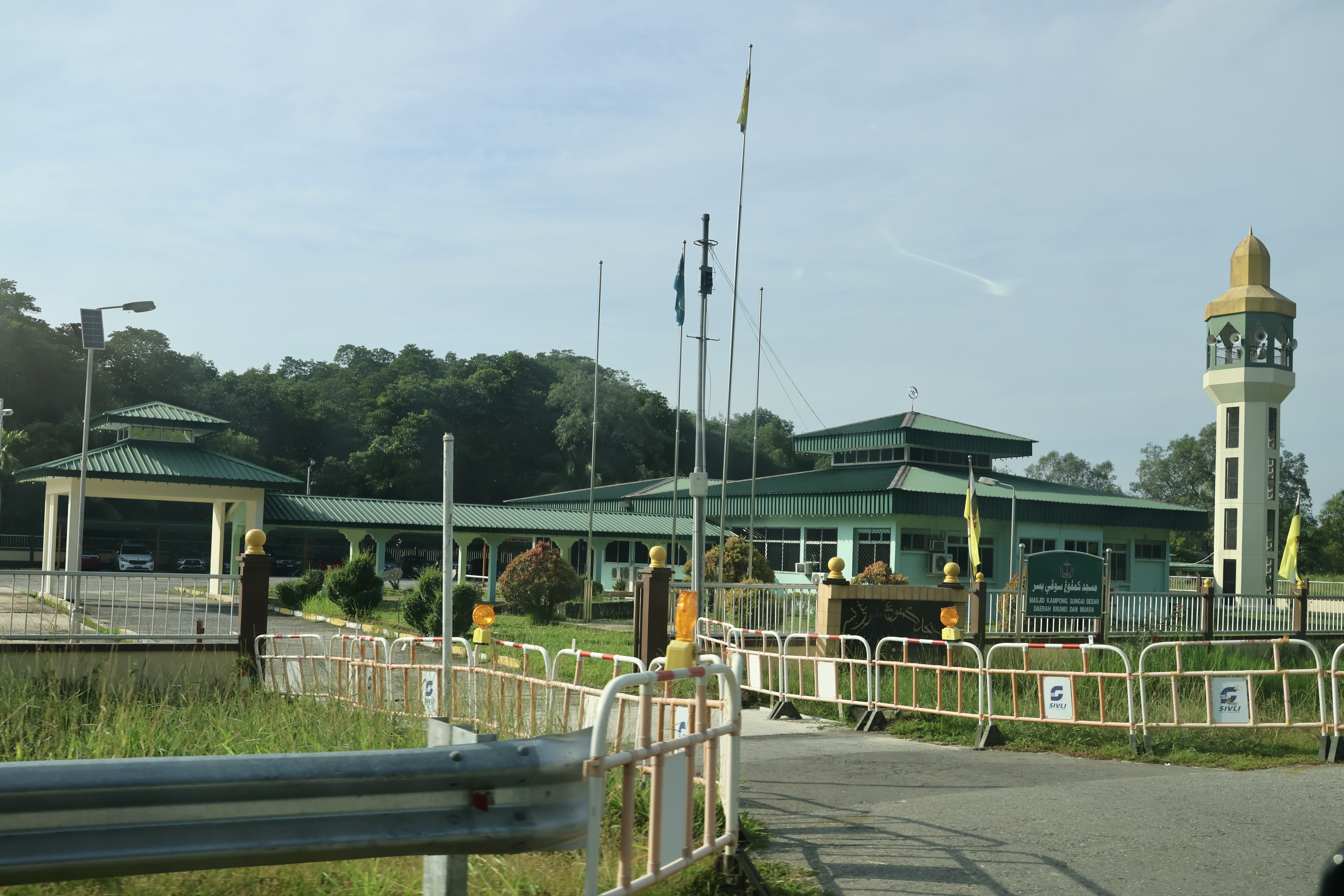
- Kampong Sungai Besar Mosque

- Location in Brunei
- Coordinates: 4°56′30″N 115°01′08″E
- Country: Brunei
- District: Brunei-Muara
- Mukim: Kota Batu

Government
  - Village head: Zaini Damit

Population (2016)
  - Total: 2,039
- Time zone: UTC+8 (BNT)
- Postcode: BD2517

Kampong Sungai Besar (Malay: Kampung Sungai Besar) or commonly known as Sungai Besar, is a village in the east of Brunei-Muara District, Brunei, near the mouth of the Brunei River with the Brunei Bay. The population was 2,039 in 2016.

The village is the location of an end of Sultan Haji Omar Ali Saifuddien Bridge, the bridge which connects mainland Brunei with the Temburong District exclave.

== Geography ==
Kampong Sungai Besar is one of the villages within Mukim Kota Batu, a mukim in the district. It is one of the villages along Jalan Kota Batu, a road which links Bandar Seri Begawan along the banks of the Brunei River to Jalan Muara which leads to Muara town.

== Infrastructure ==
=== Mosque ===
Kampong Sungai Besar Mosque is the village mosque; it was inaugurated on 1 January 1984 by the then Minister of Education. The mosque can accommodate 630 worshippers.

== Notable people ==
- Badaruddin Othman (born 1942), a politician and writer
- Goh King Chin (born 1943), a member of the Legislative Council
