= Kampong Pudak =

- Village
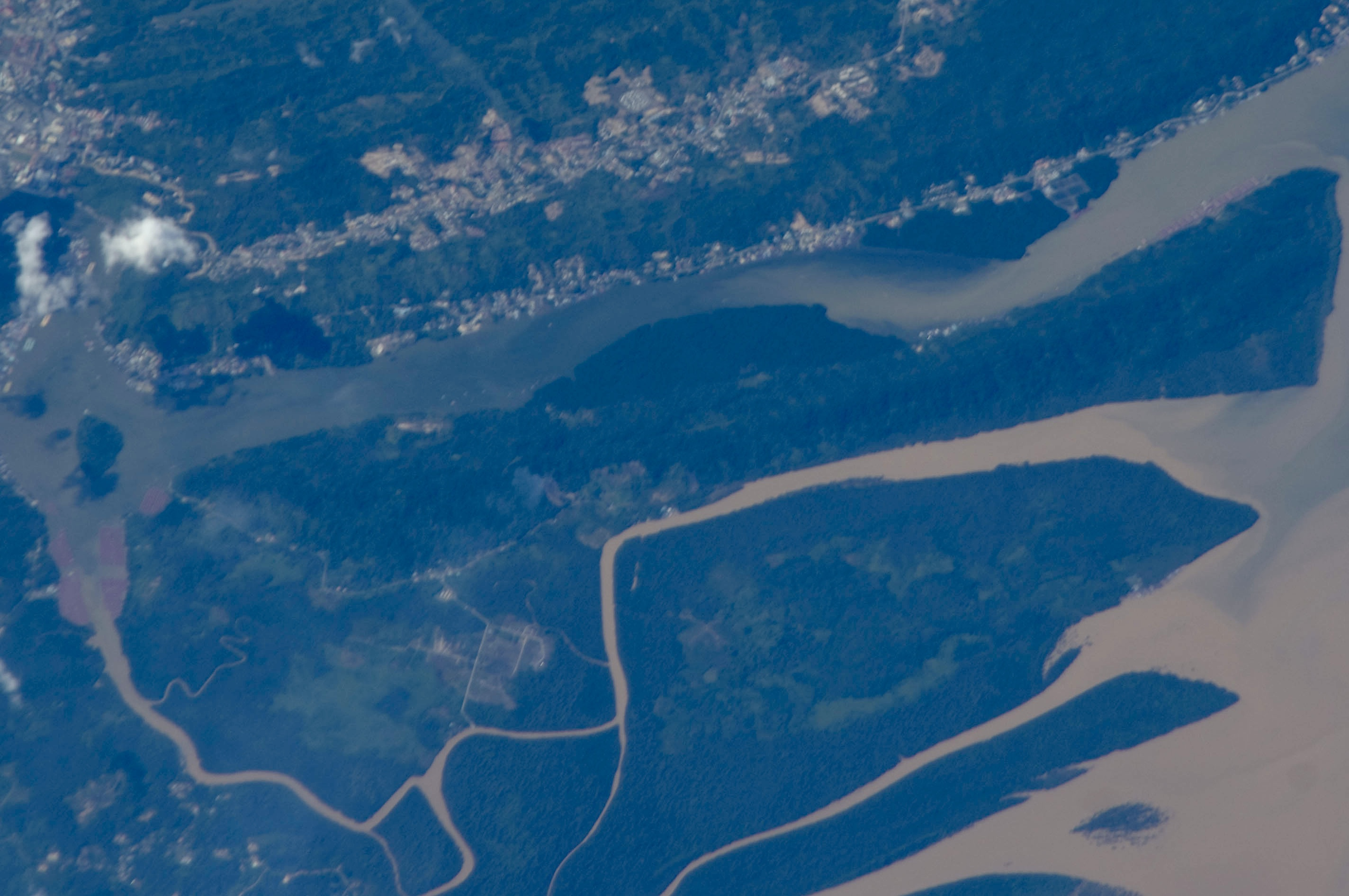
- Pudak (center) on Berambang Island

- Location in Brunei
- Coordinates: 4°53′51″N 115°00′04″E
- Country: Brunei
- District: Brunei-Muara
- Mukim: Kota Batu

Government
  - Village head: Shahri Durahim

Population (2016)
  - Total: 151
- Time zone: UTC+8 (BNT)
- Postcode: BD3517

Kampong Pudak is a small village on stilts on the Brunei River in Brunei-Muara District, Brunei. The population was 151 in 2016. It is one of the villages within Mukim Kota Batu, a mukim in the district.

== Geography ==
The village is a small cluster of stilted dwellings along the banks of the Brunei River near its mouth with the Brunei Bay. It is on the opposite side of the mainland riverbank, that is on the bank which make up the island Pulau Berambang.

== Facilities ==
=== Mosque ===
Kampong Pudak Mosque is the village mosque; it was inaugurated on 30 August 1974 and can accommodate 300 worshippers.
