= Kampong Tasek Lama =

Village in Brunei

Tasek Lama Kampung Tasek Lama
- Neighbourhood and village
- Kampong Tasek Lama
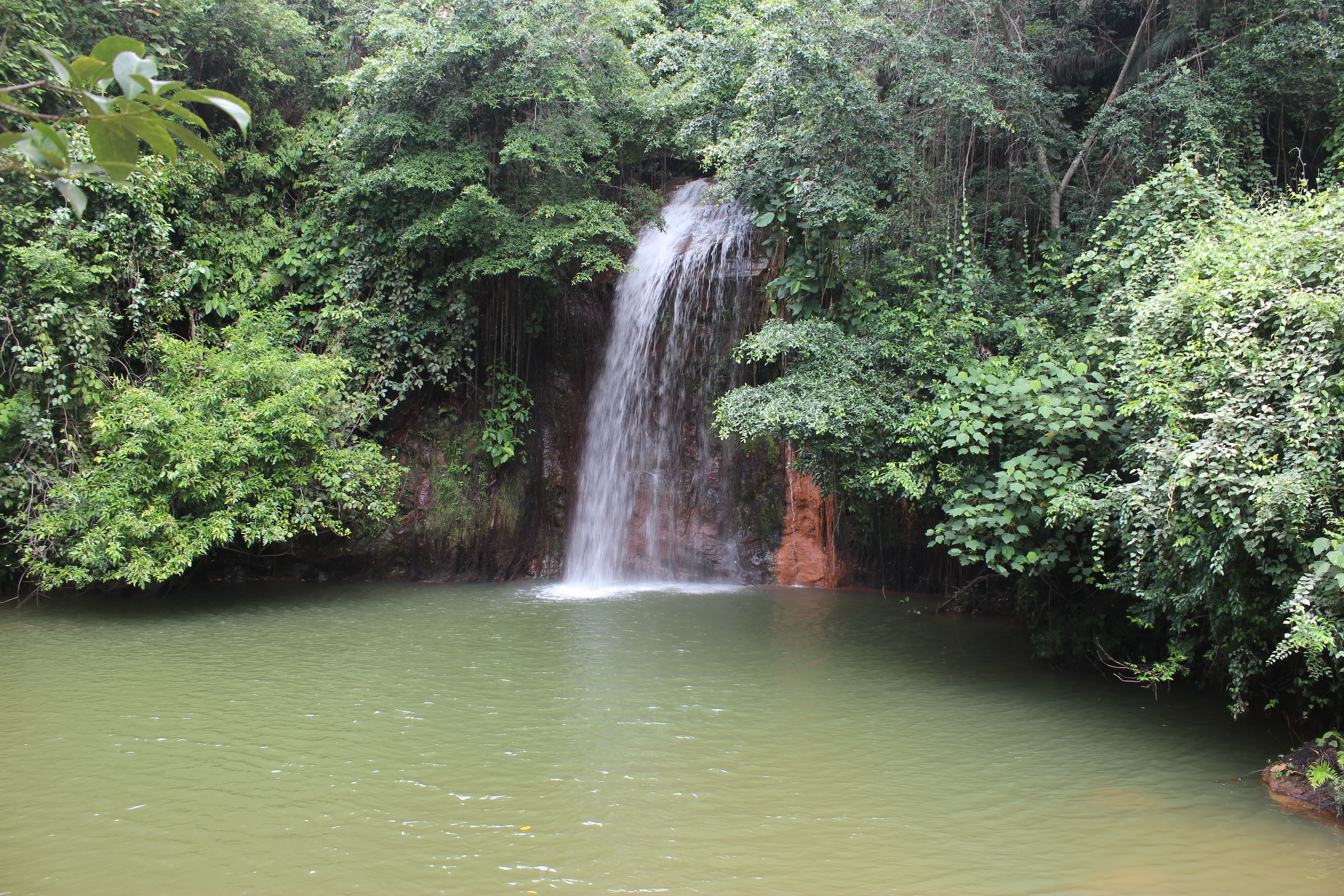
- Tasek Lama Recreational Park

- Location in Brunei
- Coordinates: 4°54′06″N 114°56′39″E
- Country: Brunei
- District: Brunei-Muara
- Mukim: Kianggeh

Government
  - Village head: Lawi Lamat

Population (2016)
  - Total: 827
- Time zone: UTC+8 (BNT)
- Postcode: BA1611

Tasek Lama, also known as Kampong Tasek Lama (Malay: Kampung Tasek Lama) is a neighbourhood in Brunei-Muara District, Brunei, as well as the capital Bandar Seri Begawan. The population was 827 in 2016. It is one of the villages within Mukim Kianggeh. The postcode is BA1611.

== Tourism ==
- Tasek Lama Recreational Park is a recreational park located within the village which consisted of a reservoir and waterfall.

== See also ==
- List of neighbourhoods in Bandar Seri Begawan
