= Kampong Sungai Belukut =

Village in Brunei

- Village
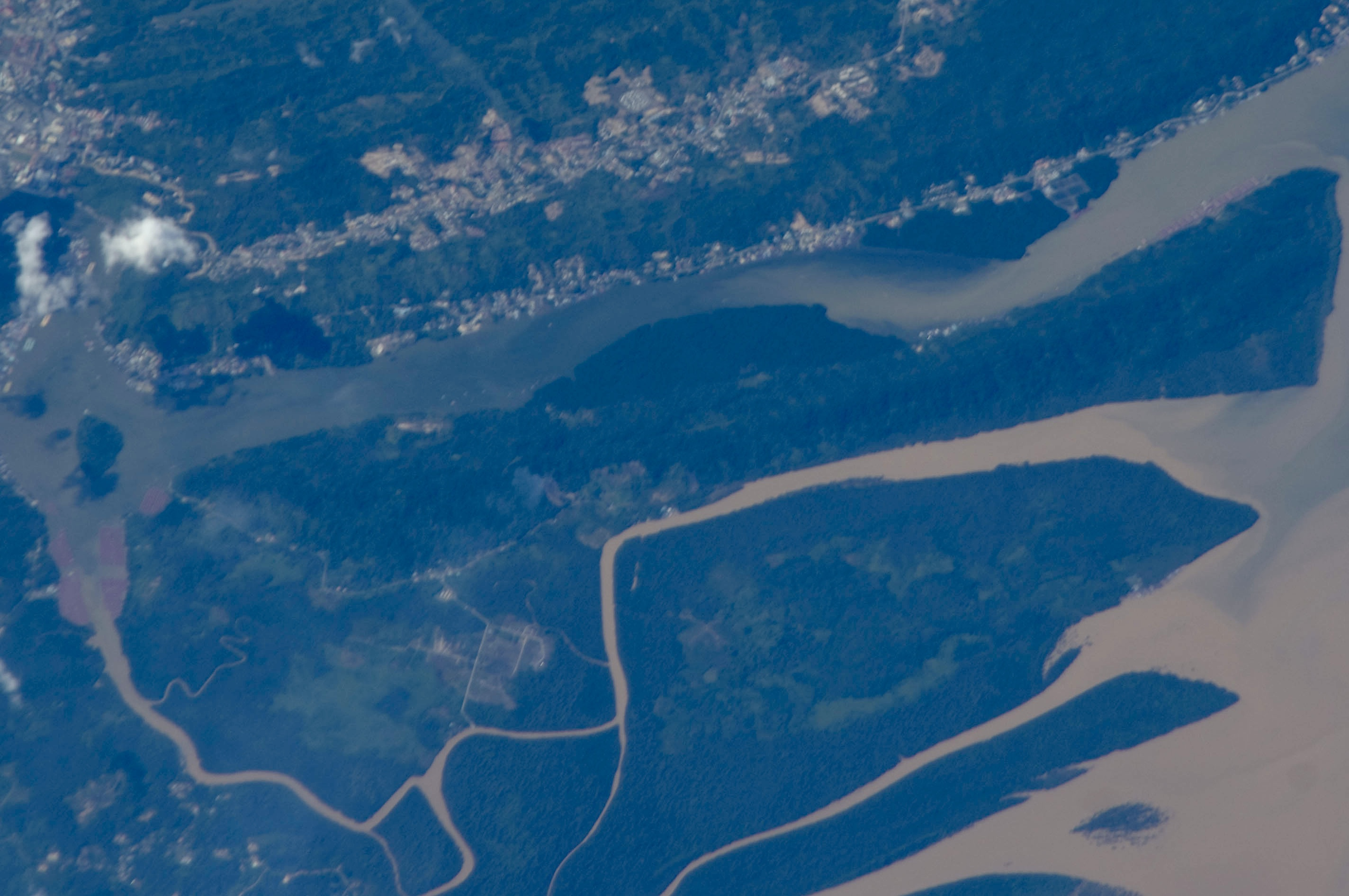

- Location in Brunei
- Coordinates: 4°54′41″N 115°00′03″E
- Country: Brunei
- District: Brunei-Muara
- Mukim: Kota Batu

Government
  - Village head: Zaini Damit

Population (2016)
  - Total: 612
- Time zone: UTC+8 (BNT)
- Postcode: BD2217

Kampong Sungai Belukut is a village in Brunei-Muara District, Brunei. The population was 612 in 2016. It is one of the villages within Mukim Kota Batu. The postcode is BD2217.
