= Tasek Lama Recreational Park =

Public park in Brunei

- Taman Peranginan Tasek Lama
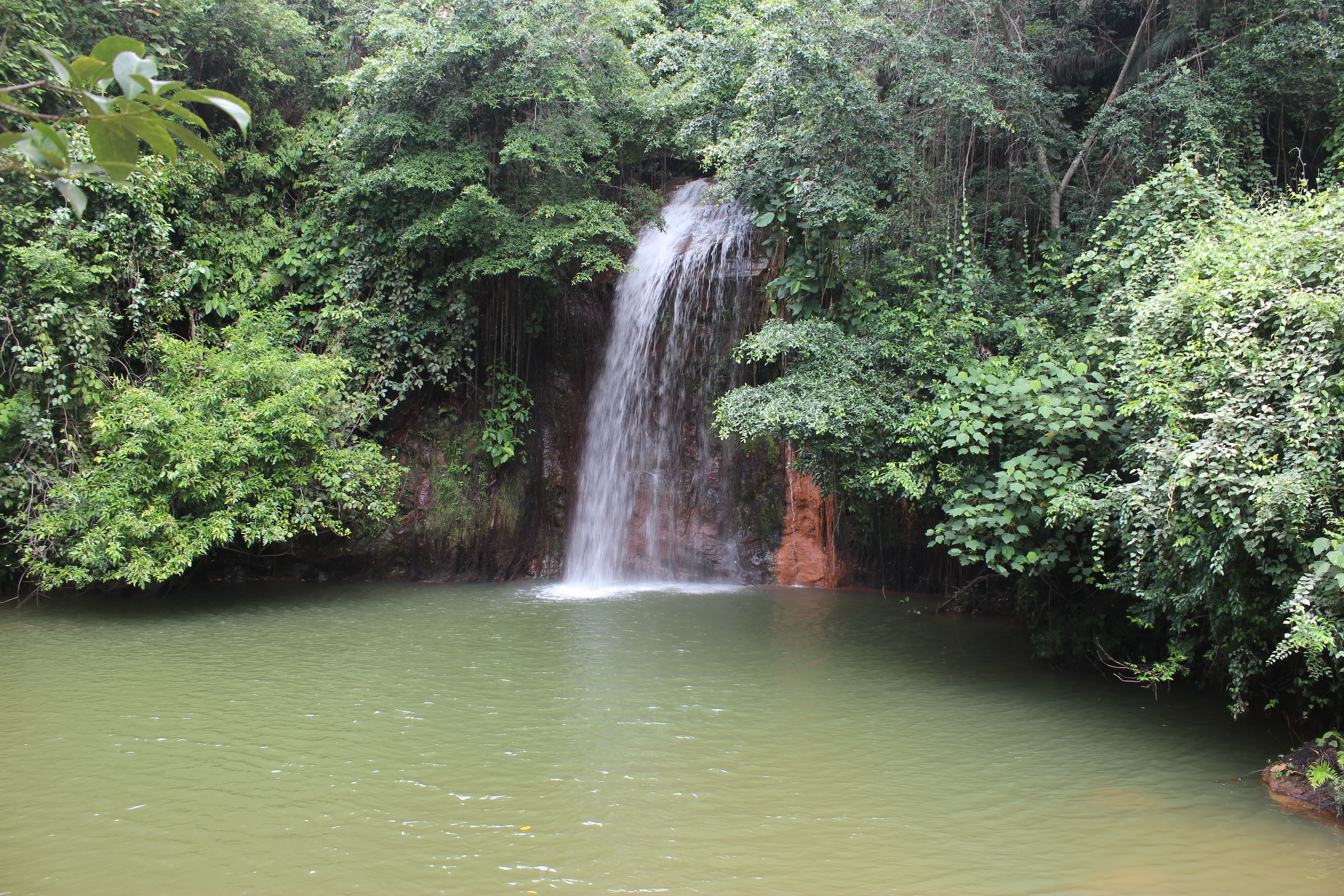
- The park's waterfall in 2017
- Interactive map of Tasek Lama Recreational Park
- Type: Urban park
- Location: Tasek Lama, Bandar Seri Begawan, Brunei
- Coordinates: 4°54′11″N 114°56′42″E
- Established: 1990s
- Manager: Department of Environment, Parks and Recreation (Note: The Ministry of Development's Department of Environment, Parks, and Recreation is in charge of overseeing the nation's recreational areas' upkeep and landscaping.)
- Parking: On site (no charge)

Tasek Lama Recreational Park (Malay: Taman Peranginan Tasek Lama) or Tasek Lama Park, (Note: The name Tasek Lama means Old Lake in English.) is an urban park located along Jalan Tasek Lama of Kampong Tasek Lama, in the heart of Bandar Seri Begawan. As one of the oldest recognised parks in the nation, it features an artificial lake and waterfall. The park is a popular destination for both locals and visitors, offering a rare green space within the city. In addition to its scenic landscape, it is known for its diverse bird population, attracting birdwatchers to observe about 80 bird species known to exist there.

== History ==
On Jalan Tasek Lama in Kampong Tasek Lama, the Tasek Lama Recreational Park was built near to Sultan Omar Ali Saifuddien College in the early 1990s.

== Features ==
Popular for a variety of outdoor activities, the park is a popular leisure place in the city. Surrounded by vegetation, the park offer pathways that go to the waterfall are used for jogging, walking, and running. The park offers various exercise facilities, including a reflexology path, gym equipment, and a children's play area. There are also hiking trails leading to Bukit Sarang Helang and other hills, such as Bukit Luba, Bukit Karamunting, and Bukit Markuching. Additionally, the jungle trails of Bukit Markuching and Sarang Helang feature a wooden terrace by the waterfall and an observation tower that provides a panoramic view of the park.

The park has been reported to support around 80 different bird species, including the straw-headed bulbul, white-rumped shama, oriental dollarbird, black-and-red broadbill, and white-throated kingfisher.

At the summit of Tasek Lama waterfall, a concrete dam was built in 1926 to direct the water flow to Brunei Town (present day Bandar Seri Begawan). In order to sustain the growing population, this initiative signalled the start of a series of initiatives from 1937 to 1947 that were aimed at improving the water supply system. In 1964, the 60 acres (24 ha) Tasek Dam and a 7,300 cubic metres (260,000 cu ft) per day treatment facility were finished. Sultan Omar Ali Saifuddien III opened the Tasek Dam on 13 February 1965.

== Events ==
To strengthen the bonds between their nations and Brunei, visiting dignitaries are invited to partake in a "Morning Walk" and engage in tree-planting activities. In 2007, Sultan Hassanal Bolkiah and Prime Minister Abdullah Ahmad Badawi walked through the park, commemorating the visit by planting palm seedlings together. During Prime Minister Najib Razak's official visit in 2009, he joined the Sultan and Prince Mohamed Bolkiah at the park, where they planted a Cyrtostachys renda tree. In 2012, Prime Minister Lee Hsien Loong began his day at the park with breakfast and a stroll alongside the Sultan, after which they jointly planted two Tristaniopsis trees near the waterfall. During their visit to Brunei in 2013, Teo Chee Hean and the Singapore delegation visited the park with Prince Al-Muhtadee Billah, Prince Abdul Malik, and other Bruneian ministers and officials. Additionally, in 2011, President Susilo Bambang Yudhoyono accompanied the Sultan on an early morning stroll during his second visit since taking office in 2004, where he planted his own Symplocos polyandra tree as observed by several government officials from both nations.
