= Mukim Kota Batu =

Mukim of Brunei

- Mukim
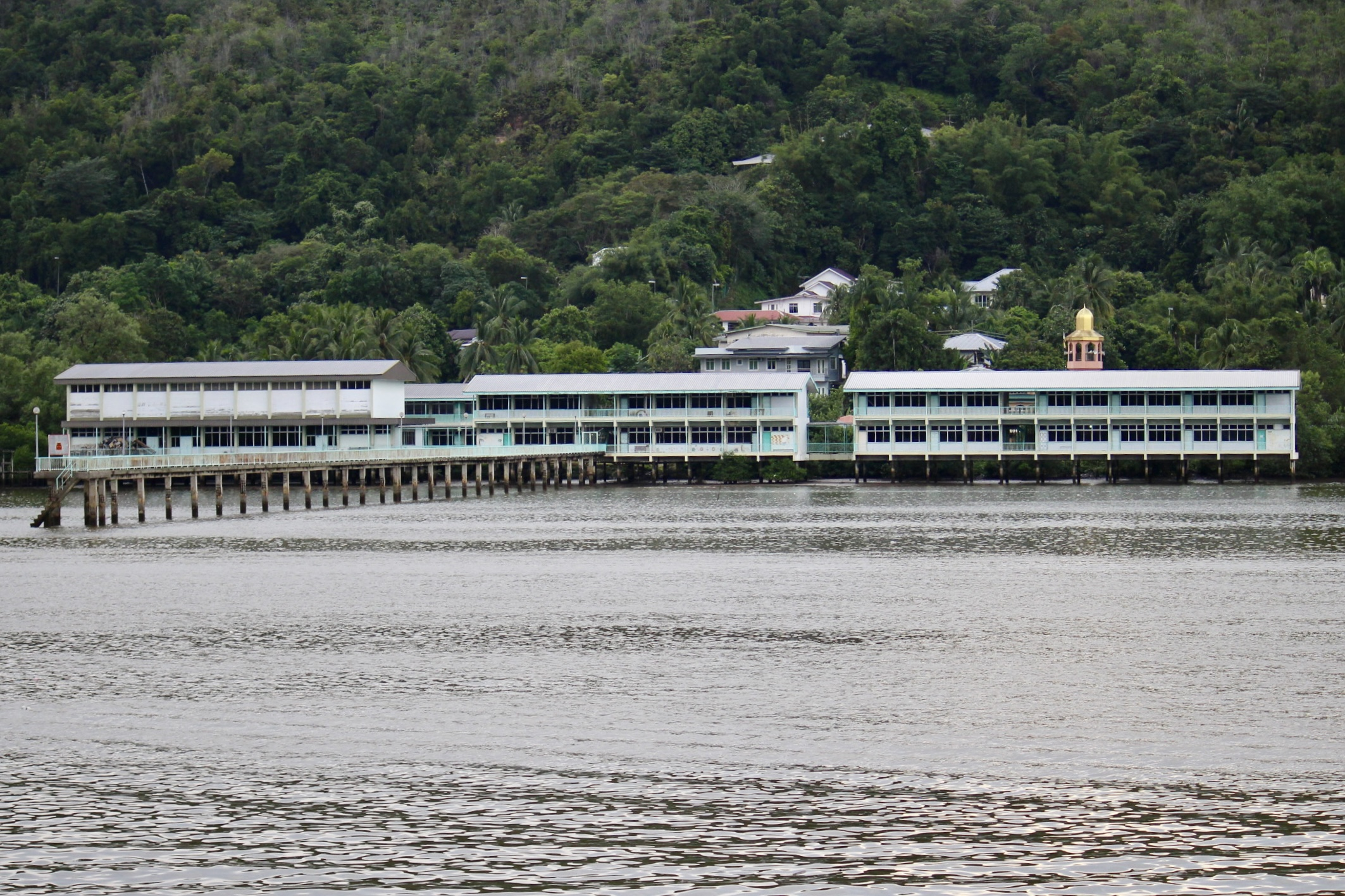
- Kampong Pelambayan

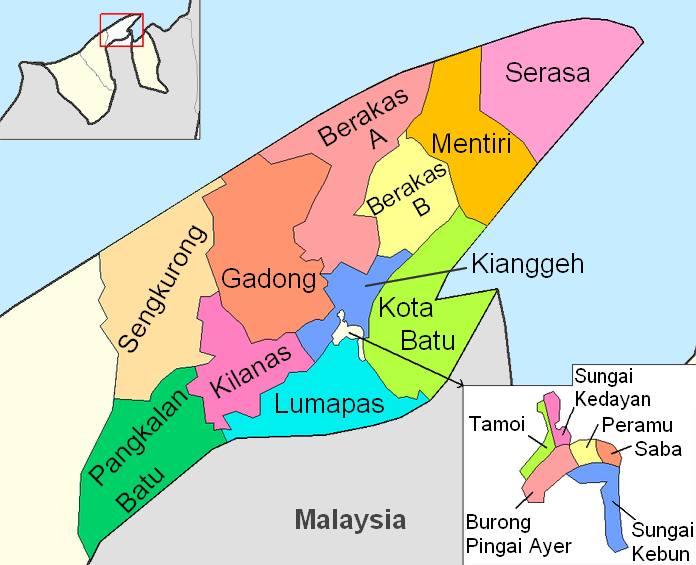
- Kota Batu is in light green.
- Coordinates: 4°52′59″N 114°57′49″E
- Country: Brunei
- District: Brunei-Muara

Government
  - Penghulu: Zaini Salleh

Population (2021)
  - Total: 12,676
- Time zone: UTC+8 (BNT)
- Postcode: BDxx17

Mukim Kota Batu is a mukim in Brunei-Muara District, Brunei. The population was 12,935 in 2016. The mukim is home to some of the country's museums and historical sites, in particular in Kota Batu.

== Etymology ==
The mukim could be named after a village that it encompasses, Kampong Kota Batu. The name Sungai Bunga translates to (Flower River). According to legend, the river occasionally smells like jasmine flowers. Particularly at night, the stench is strongest. But, if one attempted to look for the smell's source, they would never succeed. The small invisible people who live in the river, known locally as Orang Kebenaran or Orang Bunian, are thought to be the source of the pleasant flower scent.

== Geography ==
The mukim is located on the southeastern part of the Brunei-Muara District, bordering Mukim Mentiri to the north and Mukim Lumapas to the south and west, Mukim Kianggeh and the mukims within Kampong Ayer to the west, as well as the Brunei Bay to the east and Limbang District in Sarawak, Malaysia, to the east.

The Brunei River flows through the mukim into the Brunei Bay. There are several islands:

- Pulau Baru-Baru
- Pulau Berambang
- Pulau Berbunut
- Pulau Cermin
- Pulau Keingaran
- Pulau Pepatan
- Pulau Sibungor

== Demographics ==
As of 2016 census, the population was 12,935 with 50.8% males and 49.2% females. The mukim had 2,188 households occupying 2,177 dwellings. Among the population, 88% lived in urban areas, while the remainder of 12% lived in rural areas.

== Administration ==
A few of the villages are also part of Bandar Seri Begawan municipal area, namely Kampong Belimbing, Kota Batu, Pelambayan, Pintu Malim, Subok and Sungai Lampai. As of 2021, the mukim comprised the following census villages:

Settlements	Population (2021)	Ketua kampung (2024)
Kampong Subok	3,258	Lawi bin Haji Lamat
Kampong Belimbing	2,789	Haji Daud bin Jihan
Kampong Kota Batu	528	Haji Hanipah bin Begawan Pehin Udana Khatib Haji Junit
Kampong Pelambayan	630	Haji Hanipah bin Begawan Pehin Udana Khatib Haji Junit
Kampong Dato Gandi	332	Haji Hanipah bin Begawan Pehin Udana Khatib Haji Junit
Kampong Sungai Matan	281	Haji Hanipah bin Begawan Pehin Udana Khatib Haji Junit
Kampong Serdang	497	Haji Zaini bin Haji Awang Damit
Kampong Sungai Belukut	652	Haji Zaini bin Haji Awang Damit
Kampong Sungai Besar	1,816	Haji Zaini bin Haji Awang Damit
Kampong Menunggol	329	Haji Ibrahim bin Haji Osman
Kampong Riong	17	—N/a
Kampong Pudak	127	Shahri bin Haji Durahim
Kampong Tanjong Kindana	723	Zaini bin Haji Salleh
Kampong Pintu Malim	289	Haji Hanipah bin Begawan Pehin Udana Khatib Haji Junit
Kampong Sungai Lampai	350	Haji Hanipah bin Begawan Pehin Udana Khatib Haji Junit
Kampong Buang Tawar	7	—N/a
Pulau Sibungor	0	—N/a
Pulau Baru-Baru	11	Zaini bin Haji Salleh

== Infrastructure ==
=== Mosques ===
The current mosques in the mukim include:

- Kampong Pintu Malim Mosque
- Kampong Serdang Mosque
- Kampong Sungai Besar Mosque

Kampong Berbunut Mosque was the village mosque of Kampong Berbunut, the village on Pulau Berbunut ("Berbunut Island") at mouth of the Brunei River. It had been inaugurated in September 1958. As of today, the mosque no longer exists.
