= Kampong Subok =

Village in Brunei

- Village and neighbourhood
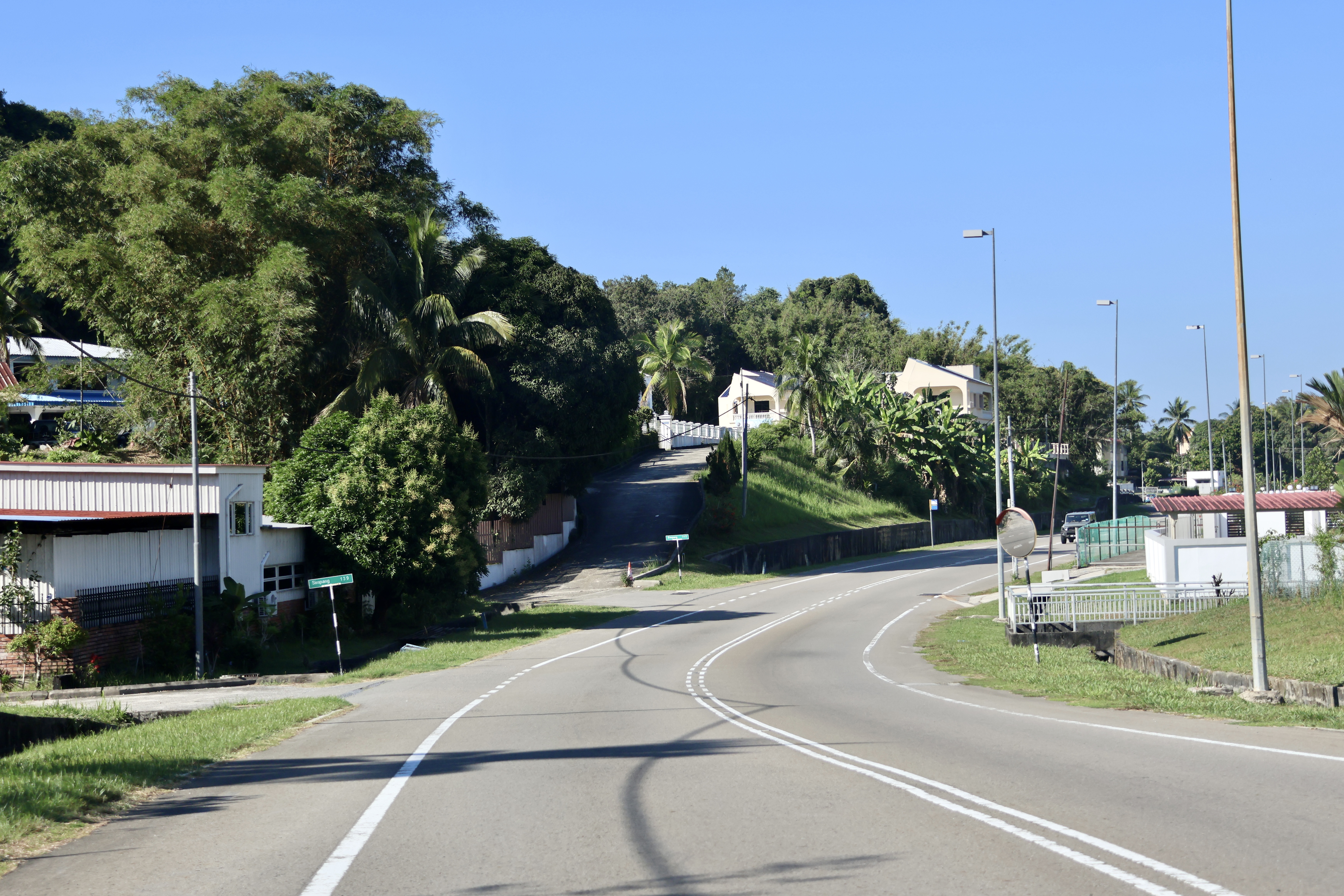
- Jalan Subok

- Location in Brunei
- Coordinates: 4°53′37″N 114°57′56″E
- Country: Brunei
- District: Brunei-Muara
- Mukim: Kota Batu

Government
  - Village head: Lawi Lamat

Population (2016)
  - Total: 2,681
- Time zone: UTC+8 (BNT)
- Postcode: BD2717

Kampong Subok is a village in Brunei-Muara District, Brunei. It is also a neighbourhood in the capital Bandar Seri Begawan. The population was 2,681 in 2016. It is one of the villages within Mukim Kota Batu. The postcode is BD2717.

== Infrastructure ==
The village is home to the headquarters of the Ministry of Foreign Affairs. The village is also home to the Singapore High Commission.
