= Kampong Serdang =

Village in Brunei

Serdang Kampung Serdang
- Village
- Kampong Serdang
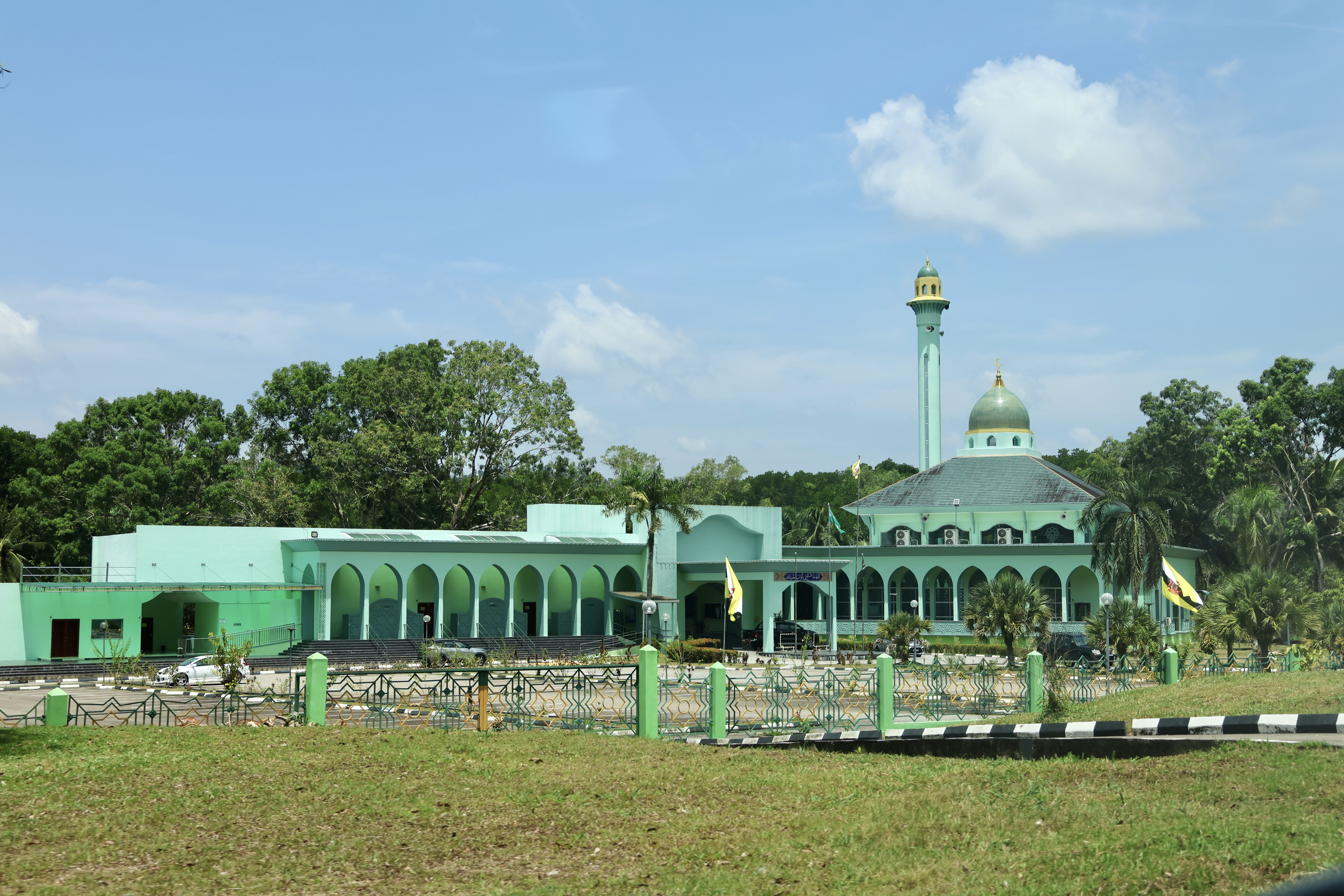
- Kampong Serdang Mosque

- Location in Brunei
- Coordinates: 4°54′13″N 114°59′31″E
- Country: Brunei
- District: Brunei-Muara
- Mukim: Kota Batu

Government
  - Village head: Zaini Damit

Population (2016)
  - Total: 609
- Time zone: UTC+8 (BNT)
- Postcode: BD2117

Kampong Serdang is a village in Brunei-Muara District, Brunei. The population was 609 in 2016. It is one of the villages within Mukim Kota Batu. The postcode is BD2117.

== Facilities ==
The village mosque is Kampong Serdang Mosque; the construction began in 1995 and completed in the following year. It can accommodate 1,000 worshippers.
