= Brunei River =

River in Brunei

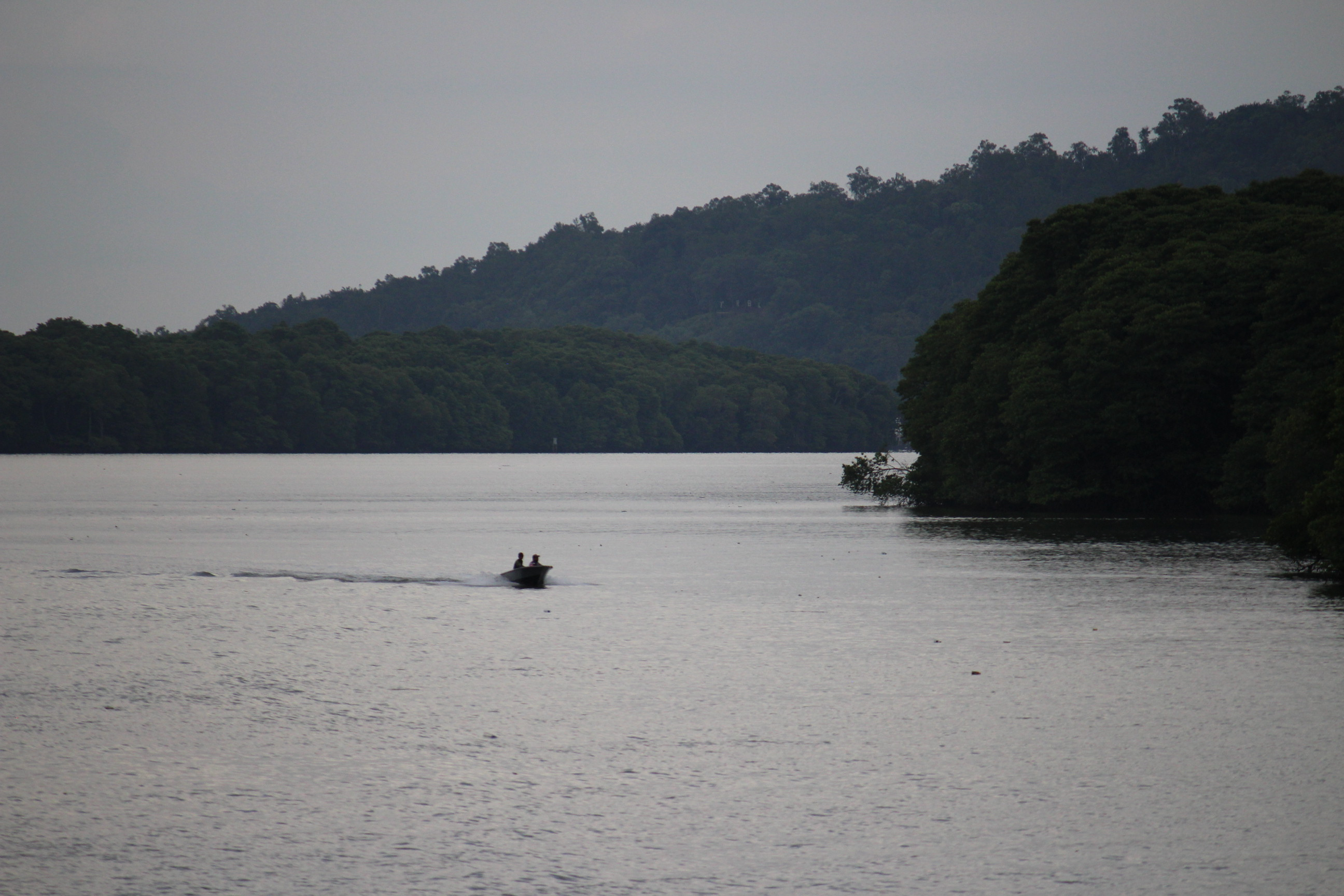
- View of Brunei River from Kota Batu
- Native name: Sungai Brunei

Location
- Country: Brunei
- District: Brunei-Muara

Physical characteristics
- Source
  - location: confluence of the Kayal and Limau Manis rivers
  - coordinates: 4°48′27″N 114°50′35″E
- Mouth
  - location: Brunei-Muara, Brunei
  - coordinates: 4°55′30″N 115°1′3″E
  - elevation: 0 m (0 ft)
- Length: 41 km (25 mi)
- Basin size: 765 km^{2} (295 sq mi)

Basin features
- River system: Brunei River
- Tributaries
  - left: Butir
  - right: Damuan, Kedayan, Kianggeh

The Brunei River (Malay: Sungai Brunei) is a river which flows through Brunei and empties into Brunei Bay towards the north-east direction. The Istana Nurul Iman, the official residence of the Sultan of Brunei, stands on its banks. The Brunei River is the shortest major river in Brunei. It is the major river basin within the Brunei-Muara District, the smallest but most populous district. It flows through the country's capital Bandar Seri Begawan. It is home to Kampong Ayer, the Brunei's traditional village on stilts over the river.

== History ==
The Sultanate of Brunei once controlled all Borneo, including parts of the Philippines and Indonesia. The region's thick jungle means the method of transport and communication was always via boats. This led to traditional settlements being established beside rivers and waterways. These waterways provided convenient transport through a jungle environment, and a supply of food.

In 2006 the Brunei government through the Department of Environment, Parks and Recreation, a department initiated the clean-up campaign of the Brunei. A total of $3.9 million has been allocated for the clean-up project, in addition to the $90,000 for the house-to-house waste collection.

== Sites ==
Kampong Ayer is the traditional Bruneian village on stilts above the Brunei River. It was the traditional capital of Brunei for centuries during the Bruneian Sultanate and extended into the British protectorate. It is now part of the capital Bandar Seri Begawan, located across the city centre.

Some of Brunei's historical sites are located along the river banks, including:

- Kota Batu Archaeological Park, the primary archaeological site in the country
- Tomb of Sultan Sharif Ali, the 3rd Sultan of Brunei
- Tomb of Sultan Bolkiah, the 5th Sultan of Brunei
- Tomb of Sultan Muhammad Hasan, the 9th Sultan of Brunei
- Makam di Luba, the tomb of Sultan Husin Kamaluddin, the 16th Sultan of Brunei
- The Royal Mausoleum (Kubah Makam Di-Raja) which is the burial place for several Sultans of Brunei including Sultan Omar Ali Saifuddien III, the previous Sultan and father of Sultan Hassanal Bolkiah
- Bubungan Dua Belas (the House of Twelve Roofs), the official residence of the British residents and high commissioners during the British protectorate
- The Brunei Museum, the country's national museum, is located in Kota Batu area, on the edge of a hill overlooking the river. Nearby, it is also home to the Malay Technology Museum, and the Brunei Darussalam Maritime Museum.
- The Limau Manis River, a source river of the Brunei River, is home to Limau Manis archaeological site which is datable to the Chinese Song dynasty (960–1279 AD).
- Istana Nurul Iman, the palace of Sultan Hassanal Bolkiah, the current Sultan of Brunei, is located on a hill overlooking the Brunei River.
- Istana Darul Hana, former palace of both Sultan Omar Ali Saifuddien III and Sultan Hassanal Bolkiah, located on a hill overlooking the river.

=== Jong Batu ===
The river is also home to Jong Batu, a rock outcrop believed to be the remains of a ship belonging to Nakhoda Manis, a figure associated with the local legend of an unfilial son cursed into stone. Similar tales can also be found in the local legends of Indonesia and Malaysia.

=== Lumut Lunting ===
The inconspicuous tiny island of Lumut Lunting, which is described in Syair Awang Semaun as the site of a cockfight between the kings of Brunei and the Majapahit Empire, is one of several well-known local myths and tales that have been associated with the Brunei River. At the mouth of the Brunei River, Lumut Lunting is positioned between Pulau Sibungur and Pulau Berambang, as opposed to Pulau Pilong-Pilongan, which is farther out at sea and closer to Muara. Both islands, Pulau Pilong-Pilongan and Lumut Lunting, have ties to a long-standing myth that dates back more than 500 years. According to legend, the incident occurred in the early years of Awang Alak Betatar's first sultanate, somewhere in the 14th century.

At the time, a rooster owned by Awang Senuai, a relative of Awang Alak Betatar, was renowned for consistently triumphing in cockfights. In a cockfight, two carefully trained and conditioned roosters engage in combat as onlookers wager on the winner. The majority of conflicts result in the death of one or both roosters. Raden Angsuka Dewa, who also owned Asmara, a rooster reputed to be comparable to Mutiara, learned about this. Asmara was carefully cared for by his owner, who provided him with a unique coop and a golden plate that was hanging high. Asmara was rumored to be powerful, intelligent, and endowed with a unique ability. The native cocks were so horrified when he crooned upon entering Brunei that they did not crow for several days.

The Majapahit King ordered that if he lost, he would hand over the 40 ships that were loaded with supplies to Brunei; but, if he won, he would receive more of the areas that Brunei currently holds and governs. Another version stated that Brunei would still be Majapahit's vassal state if it lost. For the cockfight in front of the Sultan's Palace, Asmara and Mutiara underwent thorough training. Many people came to see the battle the day it took place. The roosters started pounce, peck, attack, and kick each other as the enthusiastic onlookers cheered them on. Suddenly, Mutiara and Asmara both flew out of the ring. During the altercation, Asmara was stabbed and suffered critical injuries. Asmara disappeared from view, fell into the water unconscious from his wound, and transformed into a rock into an island (Pulau Pilong-Pilongan). When Mutiara attempted to follow, he fell into the river that the King of Majapahit had cursed. (Lumut Lunting), also changed into a rock and an island. Elder Kampong Ayer residents have a saying that Lumut Lunting will never be submerged, no of how high the water level rises. If it does, that portends a negative omen, such as the passing of a king or the happening of an unfortunate event.
