= British Forces Brunei =

British Armed Forces presence in Brunei

Coordinates: 4.6087090°N 114.3140907°E

- Active: 1963–present
- Branch: British Army
- Type: Overseas UK military base
- Role: Military training
- Part of: UK Ministry of Defence
- Garrison/HQ: Seria, Belait District, Brunei Darussalam
- Website: British Army Brunei

Commanders
- Commander British Forces Brunei: Lieutenant Colonel Andrew Todd

British Forces Brunei (BFB) is the name given to the British Armed Forces presence in Brunei Darussalam. Since the handover ceremony of Hong Kong in 1997, the garrison in Brunei is one of the remaining British military bases in the Far East, along with Singapore (and one of six East of Suez, along with Diego Garcia, HMS Juffair, UK Joint Logistics Support Base (UKJLSB), Sembawang Base in Singapore, and the Omani-British Joint Training Area).

== History ==
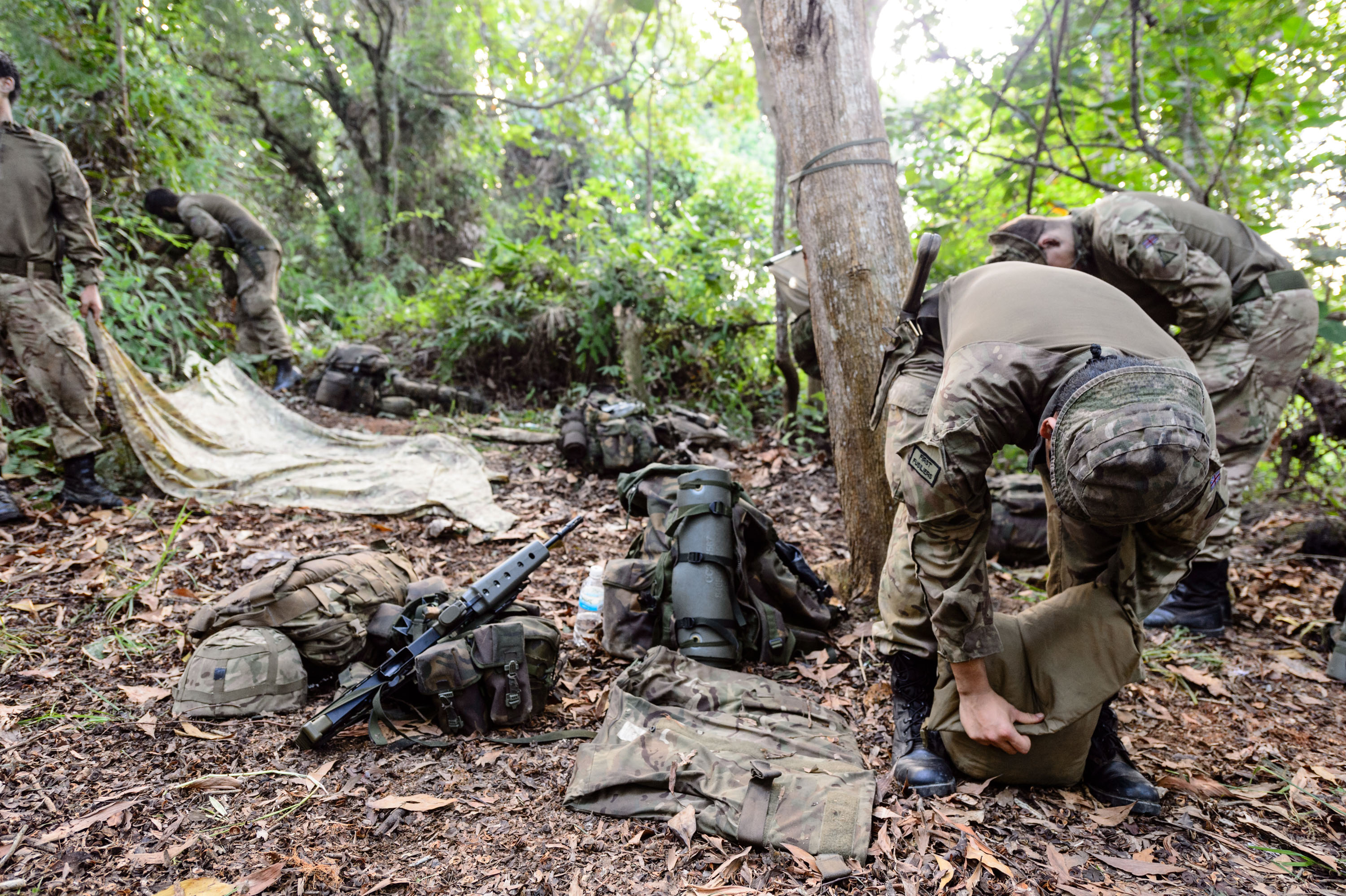
Members of the Royal Regiment of Fusiliers taking down shelters before commencing the last day of live firing in the jungles of Brunei in 2016.

The British Forces Brunei garrison came about in 1963; 63 years ago, when British troops were moved there from Singapore to quell the Brunei revolt against Sultan Omar Ali Saifuddien III in December 1962.

From there, British forces were involved in several conflicts, including helping to quell the Brunei Revolt of 1962, and the Indonesia–Malaysia confrontation. Since Brunei's independence in 1984, forces have been stationed there at the request of the current Sultan of Brunei, in a renewable agreement lasting five years at a time. The forces stationed in Brunei are available to assist the Sultan, but are also available for deployment overseas with other elements of the British Armed Forces if needed. As recompense, the Sultan pays to help support the British presence.

On 1 August 2021, No. 7 Flight AAC was re-designated as No. 667 Squadron AAC. In 2022, the Bell 212 was replaced in Brunei with the RAF Puma HC2, operated by No. 1563 Flight RAF. A year later on 27 May 2023, 1563 Flight RAF was replaced by Pumas from No. 230 Squadron RAF. When the Puma was withdrawn from British military service, 667 Squadron reformed on the Jupiter HC.2 helicopter in Brunei in 2026.

== Structure ==
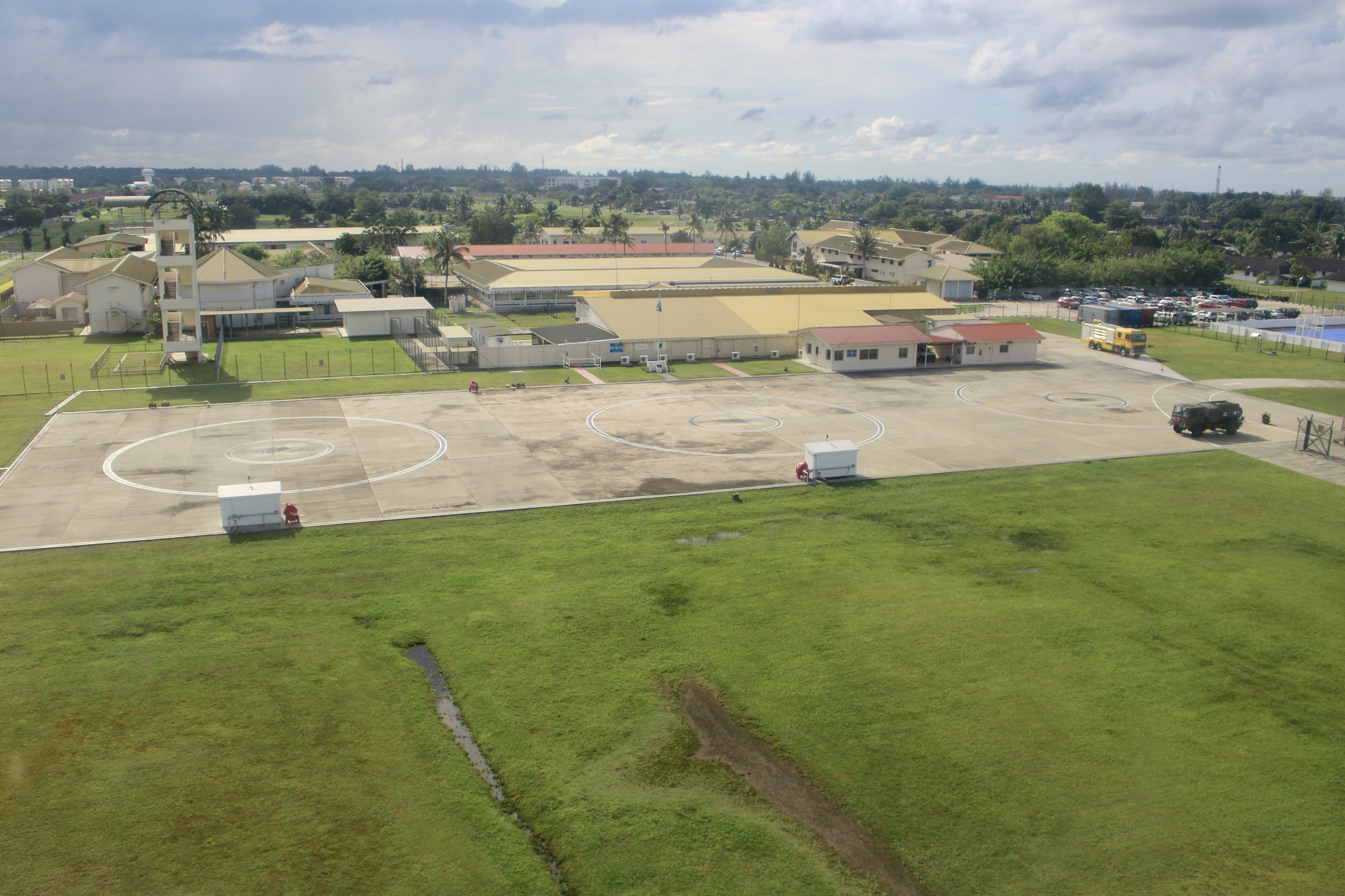
Medicina Lines in 2015.

British Forces Brunei is located at Medicina Lines and Tuker Lines, near the oil town of Seria in Belait District, and is centred on a light infantry battalion, which will be one of the two battalions of the Royal Gurkha Rifles. The battalion stationed in Brunei operates as the British Army's acclimatised Far East reserve, and is available for overseas deployment to the Far East and beyond; the Brunei-based battalion has been deployed to Afghanistan as part of Operation Herrick on several occasions, as well as to East Timor.

In addition, Brunei serves as one of the British Army's major training areas, specialising in jungle warfare, with the British Army Jungle Warfare Training School (also known as Training Team Brunei or Jungle Warfare Division (JWD)) running the Jungle Warfare Advisor's Course. The three locations that make up Brunei Garrison are Sittang Camp, which is located in the middle of the nation just outside of Tutong, Medicina Lines, which is home to the Jungle Warfare Division and 230 Sqn RAF. The Garrison Headquarters and the resident Gurkha Battalion are housed in Tuker Lines, which is also home to the Garrison Support Services.

=== Stationed units ===
- HQ Brunei Garrison
- Resident infantry battalion (rotated every three years)
  - 2nd Battalion, Royal Gurkha Rifles
- No. 667 Squadron AAC (with Airbus H145 Jupiter HC.2 helicopters)
- Jungle Warfare Division, Infantry Battle School
- Brunei Police Unit
- Brunei Signal Troop

== Off-duty life ==
The British Forces Broadcasting Service (BFBS) broadcasts to the garrison, carrying programmes from both BFBS Radio 1 and BFBS Radio Gurkha. The Hornbill School, operated by Service Children's Education, is a primary school for children of service personnel.

== See also ==
- Camp Gonsalves – United States Marine Corps equivalent jungle warfare training site
- Combat Training Centre - Jungle Training Wing – the Australian jungle warfare centre
- List of British Army installations
