= Mukim Batu Apoi =

Mukim of Brunei

- Mukim
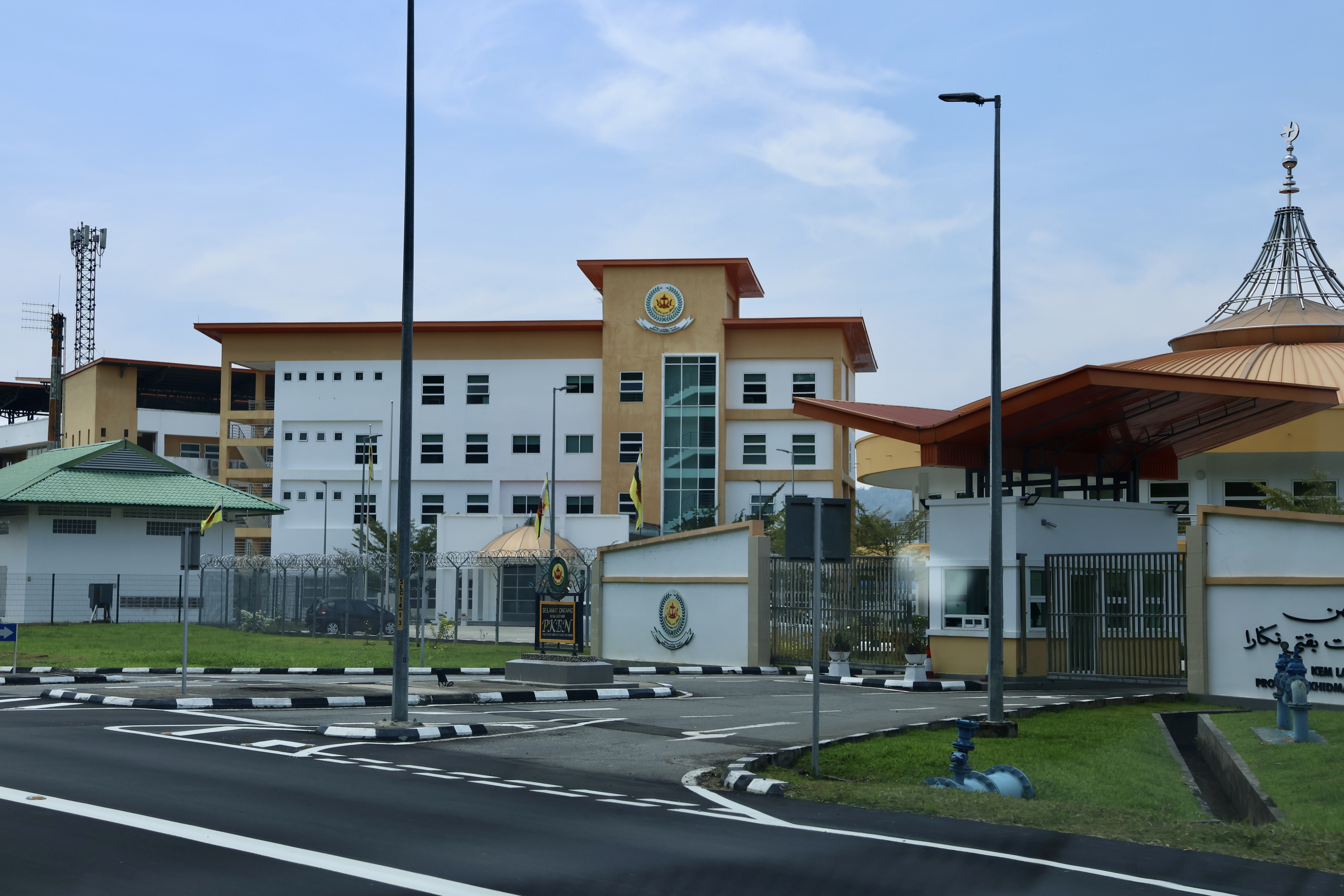
- National Service Programme (PKBN) Camp

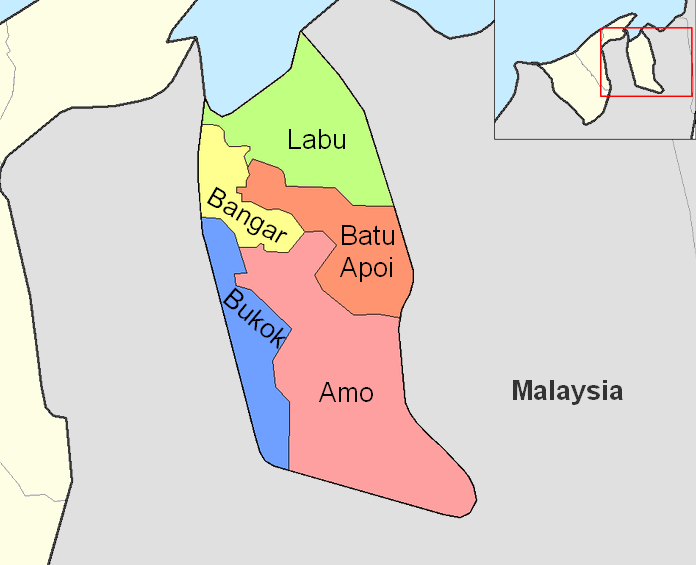
- Batu Apoi is in peach.
- Coordinates: 4°40′56″N 115°11′30″E
- Country: Brunei
- District: Temburong

Government
  - Penghulu: Sulaiman Nasir

Area
  - Total: 222 km^{2} (86 sq mi)

Population (2021)
  - Total: 1,355
  - Density: 6.10/km^{2} (15.8/sq mi)
- Time zone: UTC+8 (BNT)
- Postcode: PCxx51

Mukim Batu Apoi is a mukim in Temburong District, Brunei. It has an area of 222 square kilometres (86 sq mi); as of 2021, the population was 1,355.

== Etymology ==
Sungai Batu Apoi is where Batu Apoi gets its name. Long ago, there was a Murut longhouse there beside the river. Their myth states that a hot rock that was formerly upstream gave Batu Apoi its name. The presence of this rock rendered the entire area inhospitable and unusable to humans. Suddenly a Murut cultural hero appeared one day. He looked at the fiery rock and then tossed it into the sea far away with all of his might. He therefore made the entire region livable and secure so that the Muruts may settle there and live. Fiery rock is referred to as Batu Api or Batu Apoi in Murut, a term that has become extensively used up to this point. Apoi is the Murut word for api. The mukim could be named after Kampong Batu Apoi, one of the villages it encompasses.

== Geography ==
The mukim is located in the east of the Temburong District to the centre, bordering Mukim Labu to the north, the Malaysian state of Sarawak to the east, Mukim Amo to the south and Mukim Bangar to the west.

== Demography ==
As of 2021 census, the population was 1,355 with 53% males and 47% females. The mukim had 279 households occupying 241 dwellings. The entire population lived in rural areas.

Previously in 2014, Mukim Batu Apoi has a population of one thousand seven hundred and ninety six people (1,796) which is 950 males and 846 females consisting of Malay, Murut, Iban, Chinese, Dusun and other nationalities. From that number, 186 people received various forms of assistance from the government, namely 125 people received Old Age Pensions, 25 people received assistance from the Community Development Department (JAPEM), 9 people received assistance for the poor, 9 people received assistance for orphans, 5 people received help from new relatives, 10 people received help for handicapped while another 3 people received help for insanity.

== Administration ==
As of 2021, the mukim comprised the following villages:

Settlements	Population (2021)	Ketua kampung (2024)
Kampong Batu Apoi	84	Norasmadi bin Karim
Kampong Gadong Baru	143	—N/a
Kampong Lakiun	36	—N/a
Kampong Lamaling	71	—N/a
Kampong Luagan	43	—N/a
Kampong Negalang Ering	377	—N/a
Kampong Negalang Unat	74	—N/a
Kampong Peliunan	33	—N/a
Kampong Rebada	19	—N/a
Kampong Selapon	199	Norasmadi bin Karim (Overseer)
Kampong Selilit	0	—N/a
Kampong Simbatang (Note: Not to be confused with the village of the same name in Mukim Bokok)	85	—N/a
Kampong Sungai Radang	62	—N/a
Kampong Tanjong Bungar	129	Norasmadi bin Karim (Overseer)

== Villages ==
=== Kampong Negalang Ering ===
Luangan Si Ajap is located in Kampong Negalang Ering, and holds a unique story among the residents of the village. The term "luagan" refers to a water catchment area surrounded by land, slightly smaller than a lake. According to villagers, a luagan differs from a well, which is man-made by digging into the ground to extract water, while a luagan exists naturally. In the 1940s, the luagan was discovered by a villager named Si Ajap, who named it Luagan Si Ajap since no one had previously explored the area. This location served as a place for bathing, washing clothes, and as a source of drinking water. Legends say that a dragon named Naga Bungkar resides in the depths of the luagan.

Villagers who cultivated crops and rice near Luagan Si Ajap built huts and settled there, using the water for daily needs such as bathing, washing, cooking, and drinking. In the past, Luagan Si Ajap covered an area of about twenty feet and was regularly cleaned by the villagers. However, it has since been abandoned and overgrown with bushes, as the villagers now have piped water supplied to their homes. Despite the overgrowth, the water remains clear, and the luagan is occasionally visited by the villagers. It is only a fifteen-minute walk from the main road, surrounded by trees, and the path has been cleared for the construction of new houses. The last time Luagan Si Ajap was visited by villagers was around the 1970s. In an effort to preserve and maintain the historical significance of the site, villagers took the initiative to clear the bushes that had grown in the area.

=== Kampong Tanjong Bungar ===
Around the 1960s, the village was not located where it is now, but rather located in the area of the river bank of Kampong Batu Apoi where Bungar flowers were found. Since there were no road facilities at that time and they were often hit by floods, the residents moved and then settled in the village that is there now, which is around the 1980s. The longhouse was built in 1979. In addition to living in the longhouse, the residents of the village also live in private houses with a population of 242 people with different lifestyles, some of whom are Muslims, Christians include people who still hold fast to the old beliefs. The same is the case with the race where various races inhabit the village, namely the Dusun, Murut and Iban.

The longhouse in his village is one of the longest existing longhouses in Temburong District. Kampong Tanjung Bungar Longhouse is made of wood with only 8 doors (one door for a family) considering the limited area. The large space in front of each door is used to hold events of joy and sorrow including for social activities or a place to hold events such as cultural performances when welcoming guests.

== Economy ==
Touching on 1 Village 1 Product (1K1P) program, several villages in Mukim Batu Apoi have taken part in the project, which is known for its ambulong (sago) processing. Majlis Perundingan Kampung (MPK) Batu Apoi ambulong has received a favorable response from the public and MPK Batu Apoi often receives visitors especially from outside the district to witness the processing of ambulong. Meanwhile, MPK Tanjong Bungar handles handicraft products.

== Infrastructure ==
In 2014, the access road leading to Kampong Peliunan and Kampong Luagan was too small to make it difficult for Fire and Rescue vehicles to enter the villages in case of fire. In addition, DST and B-Mobile mobile phone services in some areas, especially in Kampong Selapon, cannot receive the service at all, as well as some areas in Kampong Batu Apoi. Also found in the mukim are three schools namely Sultan Hashim Batu Apoi Primary School, Selapon Primary School and Negalang Primary School. In addition, Mukim Batu Apoi also has a petrol station in Kampong Negalang and a mosque in Kampong Batu Apoi.

For the convenience of mukim residents to hold various community activities, the Ministry of Home Affairs through the Temburong District Office has built a community hall in Kampong Batu Apoi and another in Kampong Selapon. Meanwhile, in order to carry out sporting activities, a sports complex, the Temburong Sports Complex, has been built in Mukim Batu Apoi, which is located in Kampong Batu Apoi. The complex, which is used for free, gives many advantages to the residents of the subdistrict and all the residents of the Temburong District.

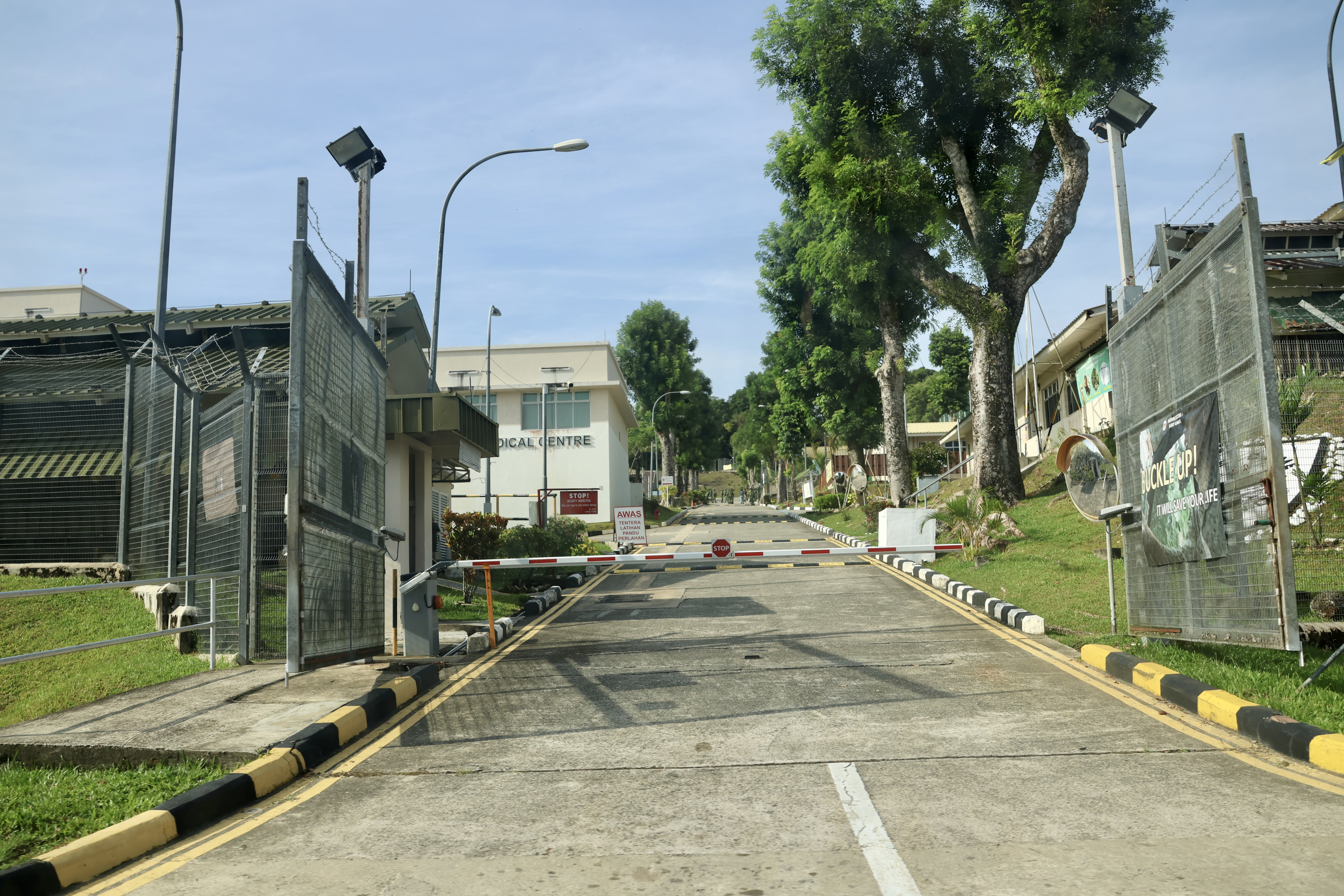
SAF Lakiun Camp

=== Military ===
Touching on the deployment of members of the Singapore Armed Forces (SAF) in Kampong Lakiun, their deployment did not cause any problems among the local residents. To date, a total of over 70 members of the SAF are permanently stationed at Lakiun Camp, not including the 200 to 300 members who undergo training every 3 weeks.

=== Places of interest ===
- Taman Aie Tenap is a park located in Kuala Sungai Selapon of Kampong Selapon. It was discovered and cultivated in the 2000s without any special allocation and was only cultivated to the extent that the local residents could. Now, rest huts have been set up to make it easier for visitors to have fun with their families in addition to providing barbecue grills.
- Wasai Rampadih is a wasai (small waterfall) located in Ulu (Inner) Sungai Selapon. Although the resort is surrounded by natural beauty and a very interesting waterfall, the wasai is very difficult to go to by having to travel for about two hours from Taman Aie Tenap making it difficult to advance and visit.
