= Omani-British Joint Training Area =

Joint military training area in central-eastern Oman

- Part of Ras Madrakah Training Area
- Duqm in Oman
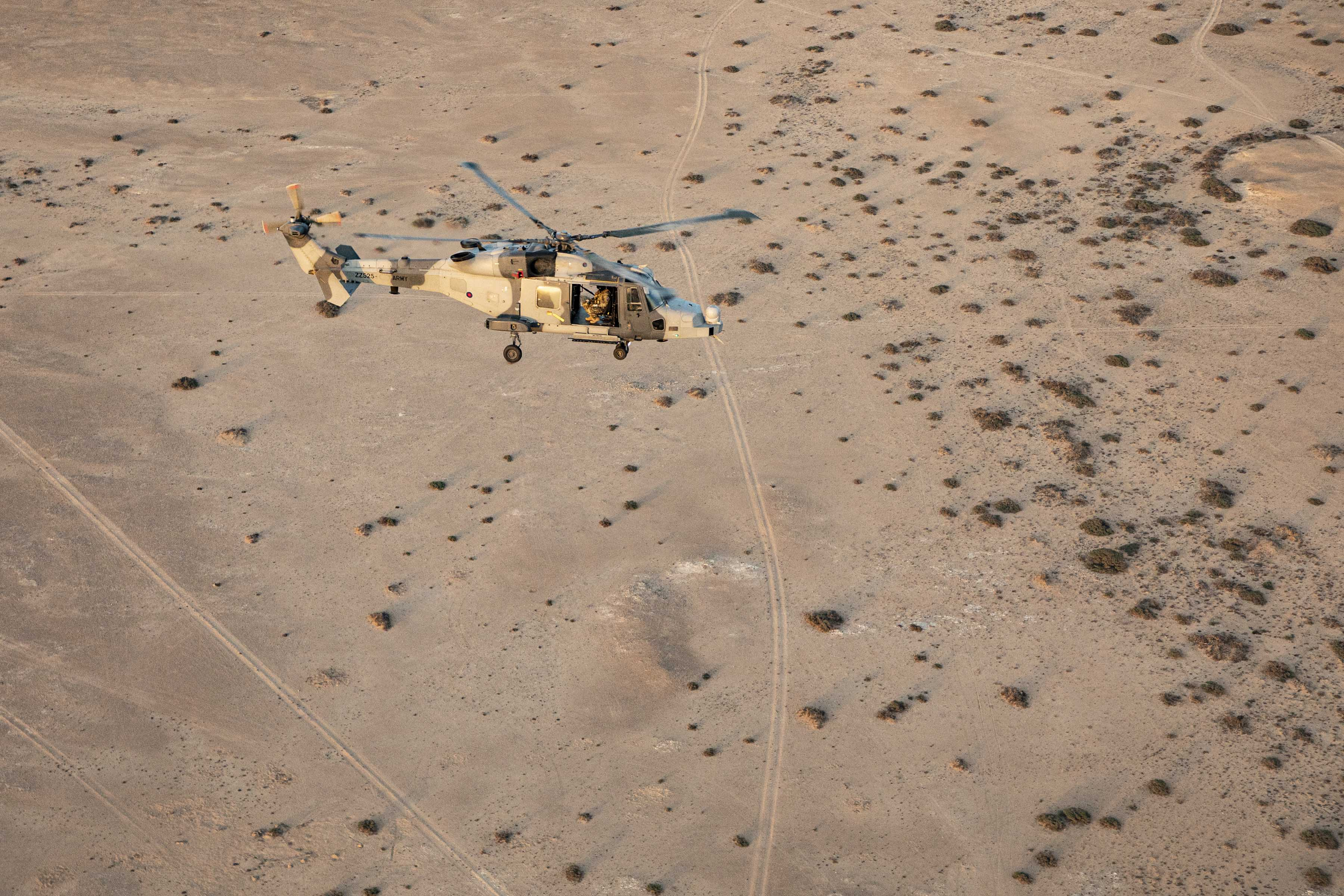
- An Army Air Corps AW159 Wildcat helicopter above the training area in 2021.

Site information
- Type: Training area
- Owner: Oman; United Kingdom
- Operator: Royal Army of Oman; British Army

Location
- Area: 4,000 square kilometres (1,500 mi^{2})

Site history
- In use: 2019–present

The Omani-British Joint Training Area is a training area established in 2019 for joint military training between Oman and the United Kingdom. It is also used as a Land Regional Hub for expeditionary warfare by the British Army.

== Background ==
Options for a permanent training area were first discussed at ministerial level in 2015. In November 2018, British Defence Secretary Gavin Williamson announced that a new Omani-British Joint Training Area would be established in 2019 to facilitate joint military training between the two countries on a long-term basis, as well as to help the UK maintain a forward presence in the region. A Joint Defence Agreement (JDA) was signed by the two countries on 21 February 2019 which officially mandated the creation of the base.

Oman and the UK have shared close cultural, economic and military ties since the 1970 Omani coup d'état which saw Qaboos bin Said installed as the Sultan of Oman with significant British support. The 2019 JDA was considered by some foreign policy analysts to be an attempt by the then-terminally ill Sultan to make institutional arrangements which will outlast his reign and ensure close relations with the UK continue under his successor. The agreement was also the result of intensifying British engagement in the wider region as the country sought to consolidate its global influence after leaving the European Union. The two countries have previously engaged in large-scale military exercises — the largest being Exercise Saif Sareea, which was held in 1986, 2001 and 2018.

== History ==
The training area opened sometime during 2019. Prior to opening, an exercise, named Exercise Khanjer Oman 19, was held to test its viability in March 2019. The exercise involved the British Army's Royal Tank Regiment, 1st Armoured Infantry Brigade and supporting units, such as No. 659 Squadron AAC and was concluded a success.

Located within the 4,000-square-kilometre (1,500 mi^{2}) Ras Madrakah training area near the Omani port town of Duqm, the Omani-British Joint Training Area is the largest training area used by the British Army—larger than both the British Army Training Unit Suffield (BATUS) in Canada and the Salisbury Plain Training Area (SPTA) in the United Kingdom. It enables a permanent British Army presence within the region, working closely with the UK Joint Logistics Support Base (UKJLSB) in the nearby Al Duqm Port & Drydock.

In 2021, the British Army announced that its battlegroups would spend longer periods at the base to enhance regional deterrence and persistent presence. The base will be used as a Land Regional Hub (LRH) by the British Army to support expeditionary warfare. Another Khanjar Oman exercise was held in October 2021 and featured 650 British soldiers, as well as Apache attack helicopters. The British and Omani battle groups on the ground received support from the aircraft carrier HMS Queen Elizabeth and her carrier strike group, including F-35B Lightning II strike aircraft.

== See also ==
- East of Suez
- Overseas military bases of the United Kingdom
- Oman–United Kingdom relations
