= Kampong Batu Apoi =

Village in Brunei

- Village
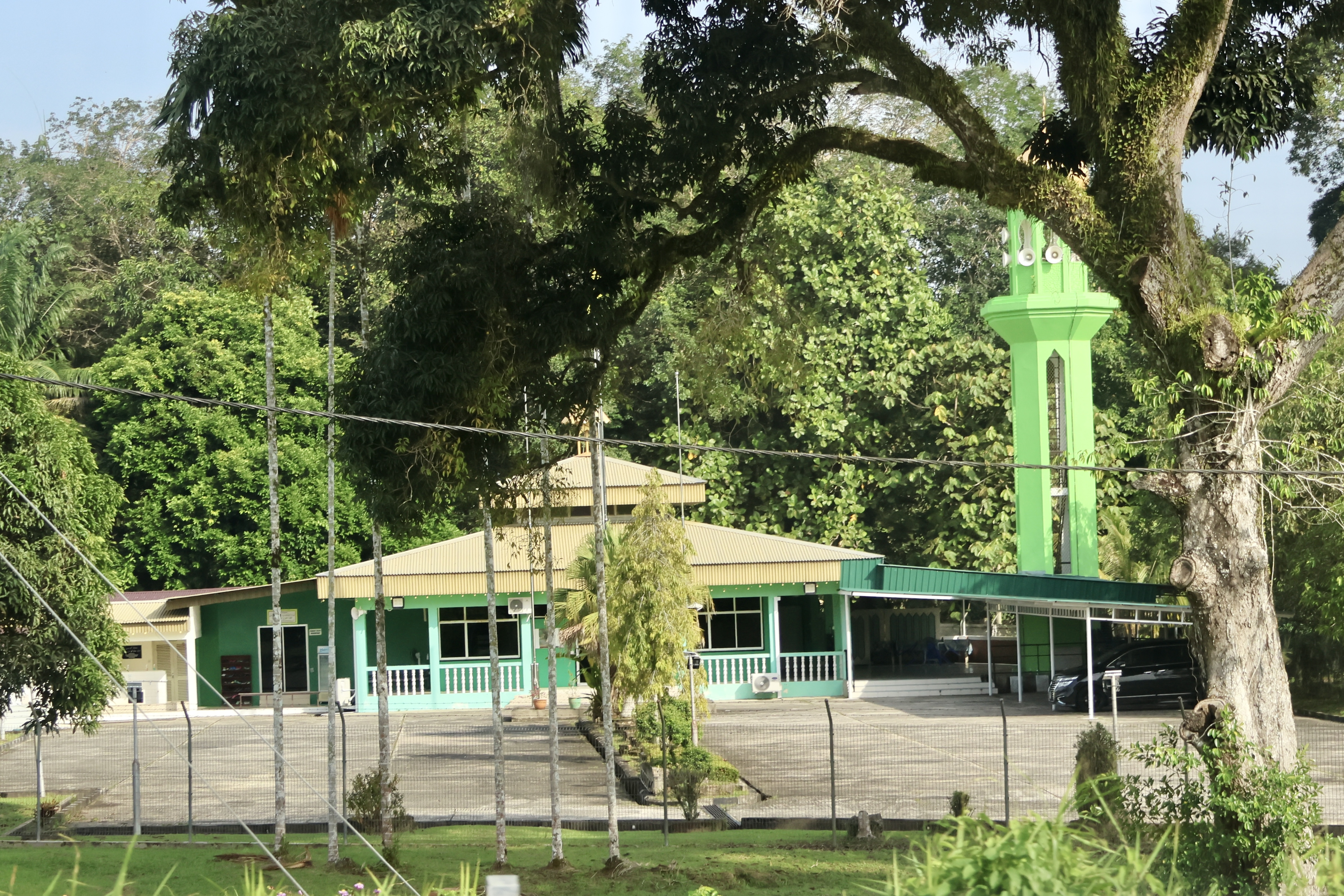
- Kampong Batu Apoi Mosque

- Location in Brunei
- Coordinates: 4°42′53″N 115°06′41″E
- Country: Brunei
- District: Temburong
- Mukim: Batu Apoi

Government
  - Village head: Norasmadi Karim

Population (2021)
  - Total: 84
- Time zone: UTC+8 (BNT)
- Postcode: PC1151

Kampong Batu Apoi is a village in Temburong District, Brunei, about 5 kilometres (3.1 mi) East from the district town Bangar. The population was 84 in 2021. It is one of the villages within Mukim Batu Apoi. The postcode is PC1151.

== Etymology ==
Sungai Batu Apoi is where Batu Apoi gets its name. Long ago, there was a Murut longhouse there beside the river. Their myth states that a hot rock that was formerly upstream gave Batu Apoi its name. The presence of this rock rendered the entire area inhospitable and unusable to humans. Suddenly a Murut cultural hero appeared one day. He looked at the fiery rock and then tossed it into the sea far away with all of his might. He therefore made the entire region livable and secure so that the Muruts may settle there and live. Firey rock is referred to as Batu Api or Batu Apoi in Murut, a term that has become extensively used up to this point. Apoi is the Murut word for api.

== Geography ==
At Batu Apoi Estate, an estimate of 258 inches (6,600 mm) of rainfall was recorded in 1938, which was the wettest year on record.

== History ==
Prior to the discovery of oil in Seria, mukims Labu and Batu Apoi were the main rubber-producing regions, and each mukim has a sizable rubber plantation. According to a 1916 report, a factory and other structures were built on the Batu Apoi Estate, which was owned by the Liverpool (Brunei) Para Rubber Estates, and all the necessary preparations were made to begin tapping over a small area in the new year. In 1934, Batu Apoi Estate and Biang Estate had a population of 229 and 130 laborers.

== Economy ==
A hamlet can grow as a result of the residents' inventiveness in creating a product. The economy of the village will be able to grow thanks to the range of local goods created by the residents themselves and not only relying on one commodity. Some of the people that live in Kampung Batu Apoi do it. The 1 Village 1 Product Program (1K1P) relies on the production of ambulung (sago) as a product, but the villagers also exercise their own ingenuity by broadening the village's already-existing resources.

The local delicacy known as kuih sapit is already well known to many of us. The ingredients for this dry meal that is popular among local foodies include flour, sugar, coconut milk, and eggs. However, Dayang Normah binti Ismail, the Women's Bureau Assistant for the Batu Apoi Village Consultative Council (MPK), had success in manufacturing sapit ambulung as a stream from the village's goods. He has broadened the production of the delicacy by creating kuih sapit made from sago on the advice of the Ketua Kampong Batu Apoi, Awang Haji Daud bin Haji Masri. Following then, the village's kuih sapit ambulung product appeared.

Manufacturing of kubals (classic dish that is frequently consumed with bananas) is another output of the MPK Batu Apoi stream in addition to sapit ambulung. MPK does produce ambulung, provides the sago used to manufacture the ambulung kubal. Additionally, the village had been claimed to be actively involved in the production of ambulung since 2013, when MPK Batu Apoi began processing them.

== Infrastructure ==
Sultan Hashim Primary School is the village's government primary school. It also shares grounds with Sultan Hashim Religious School, the village's government school for the country's Islamic religious primary education. The district's only secondary school, Sultan Hassan Secondary School, is also located in Kampong Batu Apoi.

The village mosque is Kampong Batu Apoi Mosque. It was inaugurated on 4 September 1987 and can accommodate 200 worshippers.

The village is also home to the PKBN Base Training Camp, the country's voluntary military national service.

Batu Apoi Industrial Complex, a small 5.4 hectares (13 acres) industrial estate.

The Batu Apoi Bridge was built around 1960. It spans the Batu Apoi River in Labu, near the Batu Apoi community hall and Batu Apoi Mosque, with a length of 300 feet and a width of 40 feet. This bridge serves as the main route to the Customs and Immigration Control Post and is also the primary access to Bukit Patoi, Mukim Labu. With its construction, the surrounding recreational area and the agricultural and other sectors have been able to develop and expand.
