= East of Suez =

British foreign policy in Asia

East of Suez is a term used in British military and political discussions in reference to interests east of the Suez Canal, and may or may not include the Middle East. The phrase was popularised by Rudyard Kipling in his 1890 poem "Mandalay". It later became a popular song when a tune was added by Oley Speaks in 1907.

"Ship me somewheres east of Suez, where the best is like the worst,
Where there aren't no Ten Commandments an' a man can raise a thirst;"

== 19th century ==
The opening of the Suez Canal in 1869 provided the shortest ocean link from Britain to the Far East by making the long journey around the Cape of Good Hope unnecessary. With the 1882 invasion and occupation of Egypt, the United Kingdom took de facto control of the country as well as joint control along with the French of the Suez Canal – which had been described as the “jugular vein of the Empire”.

The canal and the imperial outposts east of the canal were of genuine strategic value to the British Empire and its military infrastructure drew on sea lanes of communication through the Mediterranean Sea via the Suez Canal, alternatively round the Cape of Good Hope to India, and on to East Asia (Brunei, Burma, Malaya, Hong Kong, North Borneo, Singapore, Sarawak) and Australia.

== 20th century ==
=== Fall of Singapore ===
The capture of Singapore by the Japanese on 15 February 1942, which was preceded by the sinking of Prince of Wales and Repulse, severely damaged the Empire as it lost a strategic imperial outpost and presaged the end of British imperial power post–Second World War. Then, with the Partition of India later in 1947, there was a gradual decrease of the military presence "East of Suez", marking the end of the Empire.

=== Suez Crisis ===
The Suez Crisis—a diplomatic and military confrontation in November 1956, caused by the nationalisation of the Suez Canal by Egyptian President Gamal Abdel Nasser—ended in Egypt taking complete control of the canal. Both the United States and the USSR threatened the British to relent, exposing the now marginalised economic and military influence of the UK and its loss of superpower status, limiting its access to its bases in the Middle East and Asia.

=== Devaluation of the pound ===
In January 1968, a few weeks after the devaluation of the pound, the Labour Party Prime Minister Harold Wilson and his Defence Secretary, Denis Healey, announced that British troops would be withdrawn in 1971 from major military bases in South East Asia, "east of Aden", primarily in Malaysia and Singapore as well as the Persian Gulf and the Maldives (both of which are sited in the Indian Ocean), which is when the phrase "East of Suez" became part of the vernacular. In June 1970, Edward Heath's Conservative government came to power and retained a small political and military commitment to South East Asia through the Five Power Defence Arrangements. Prior to the 1997 handover of Hong Kong to China, Britain based several units in Hong Kong.

== 21st century ==
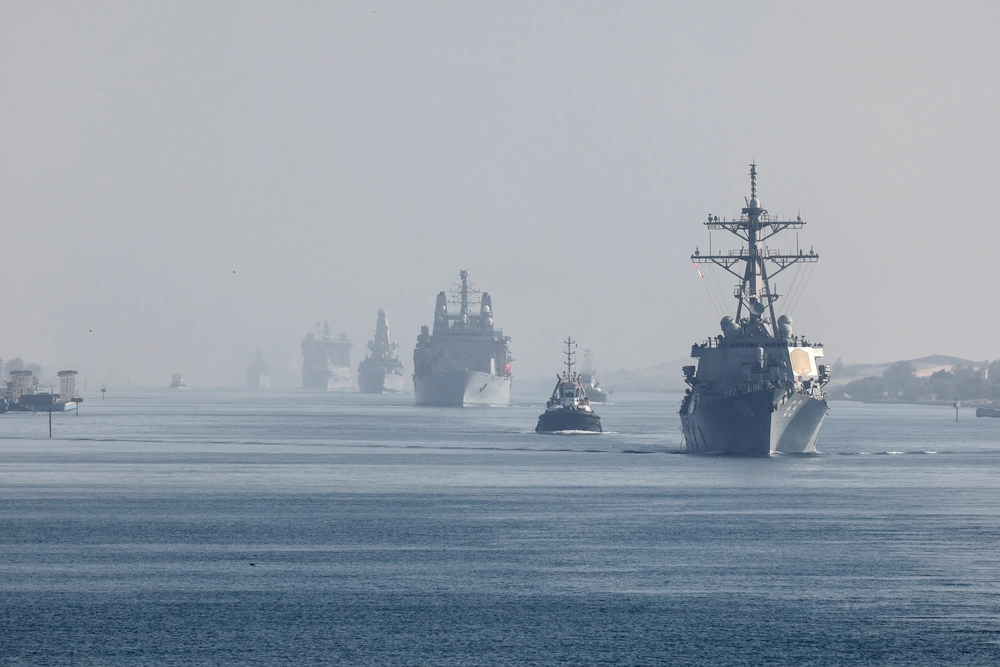
Ships of UK Carrier Strike Group 21 transiting the Suez Canal in July 2021

In April 2013, a British research institute, the Royal United Services Institute (Rusi), published a report which stated that the UK is in the process of a strategic shift back to an east of Suez policy. The report stated that a permanent military presence was being established at Al-Minhad in the United Arab Emirates (UAE), by the RAF, as well as the continuing buildup of British troops in the Persian Gulf states as Britain begins to withdraw its troops from Afghanistan. Furthermore, the report argued that as Britain begins to relocate its troops from Germany by 2020, the British base in the UAE could become their permanent home.

The think tank also explained that as the United States begins to concentrate more on the Asia-Pacific region in its attempt to balance China's rise as a world power, a strategic vacuum would emerge in the Persian Gulf region which was being filled incrementally by Britain. This shift of troops to the UAE coincided with establishment of the Royal Navy's UK Maritime Component Command (UKMCC) in Bahrain. In December, the UK's Chief of Defence Staff, General Sir David Richards, said: "After Afghanistan, the [Persian] Gulf will become our main military effort". Overall this would signal a reversal of Britain's East of Suez withdrawal.

In 2014, the Foreign and Commonwealth Office (FCO) announced that the UK would expand its naval facilities in Bahrain to accept larger Royal Navy ships deployed to the Persian Gulf. HMS Jufair is the UK's first permanent military base located East of Suez since it withdrew from the region in 1971. The base will reportedly be large enough to accommodate Type 45 destroyers and Queen Elizabeth-class aircraft carriers. The Strategic Defence and Security Review 2015 stated new British Defence Staffs will be established in the Middle East, Asia Pacific and Africa in 2016. In 2017, the UK Joint Logistics Support Base was established in Oman, followed by a new Omani-British Joint Training Area in 2019.

Britain maintains a Jungle Warfare Training School in Brunei, and a battalion of the Royal Gurkha Rifles in addition to some aircraft of the Army Air Corps as part of the British Military Garrison Brunei. There is also a small British military presence remaining on Diego Garcia in the British Indian Ocean Territory, and a refuelling station (manned by Royal Navy personnel) in Sembawang, Singapore, as part of the Five Power Defence Arrangements.

== See also ==
- British foreign policy in the Middle East
- Indo-Pacific
