= Kampong Selapon =

Village in Brunei

- Village
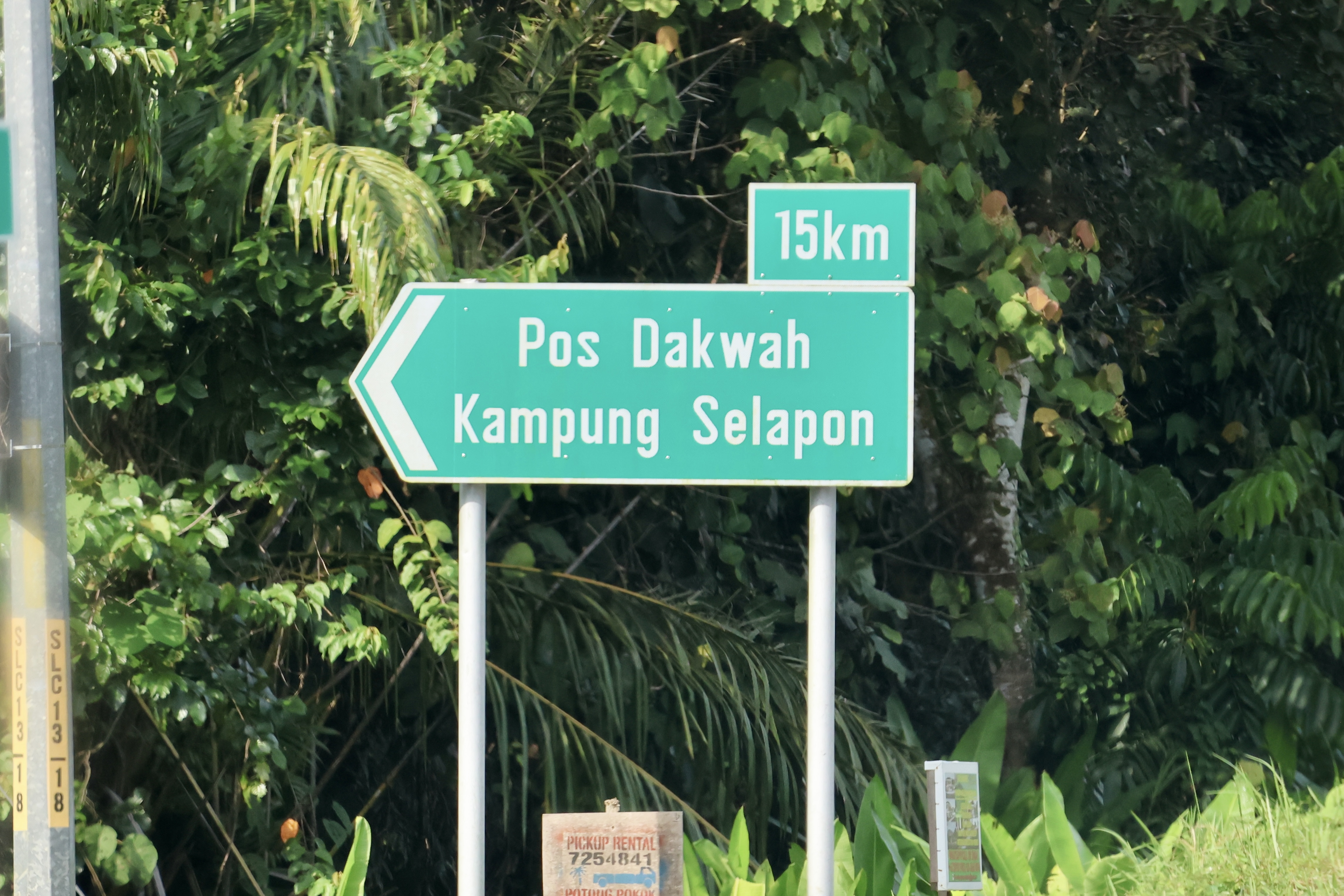
- Road sign to Selapon

- Location in Brunei
- Coordinates: 4°40′34″N 115°11′56″E
- Country: Brunei
- District: Temburong
- Mukim: Batu Apoi

Government
  - Village head: Norasmadi Karim

Population (2016)
  - Total: 224
- Time zone: UTC+8 (BNT)
- Postcode: PC3351

Kampong Selapon is a village is Temburong District, Brunei, about 19 kilometres (12 mi) from the district town Bangar. The population was 224 in 2016. It is one of the villages within Mukim Batu Apoi. The postcode is PC3351.

== Infrastructure ==
Selapon Primary School is the village's government primary school. It also shares grounds with Selapon Religious School, the village's government school for the country's Islamic religious primary education.

=== Education ===
Selapon Primary School was established as a temporary structure in 1973 on an 8.93 acres (3.61 ha) plot of land in Selapon, it was constructed through cooperative efforts by village residents, with materials provided by the government through the Department of Education. The initial building measured 60 by 20 feet (18.3 m × 6.1 m), featuring wooden posts, wooden floors and walls, and a zinc roof. A temporary teachers' house was also built in 1973 to accommodate the teachers. The school began operations on 19 April 1974, with an enrolment of 43 students in Grade 1 and only two teachers, including the headteacher. In 1987, a new semi-permanent building was constructed near the old site, funded entirely by Sultan Hassanal Bolkiah through the Ministry of Education, and it was officially opened on 20 October 1988. Currently, it is equipped with various facilities, including seven classrooms, a library, a resource room, a computer room with eight computers, a teachers' workroom, restrooms, a headteacher's office, a school kitchen, and a wudu area, and it has operated a full-day integrated schooling system since 3 January 2005.
