= UK Joint Logistics Support Base =

British military base in central-eastern Oman

United Kingdom Joint Logistics Support Base
- Part of Al Duqm Port and Drydock
- Duqm, Al Wusta governorate in Oman
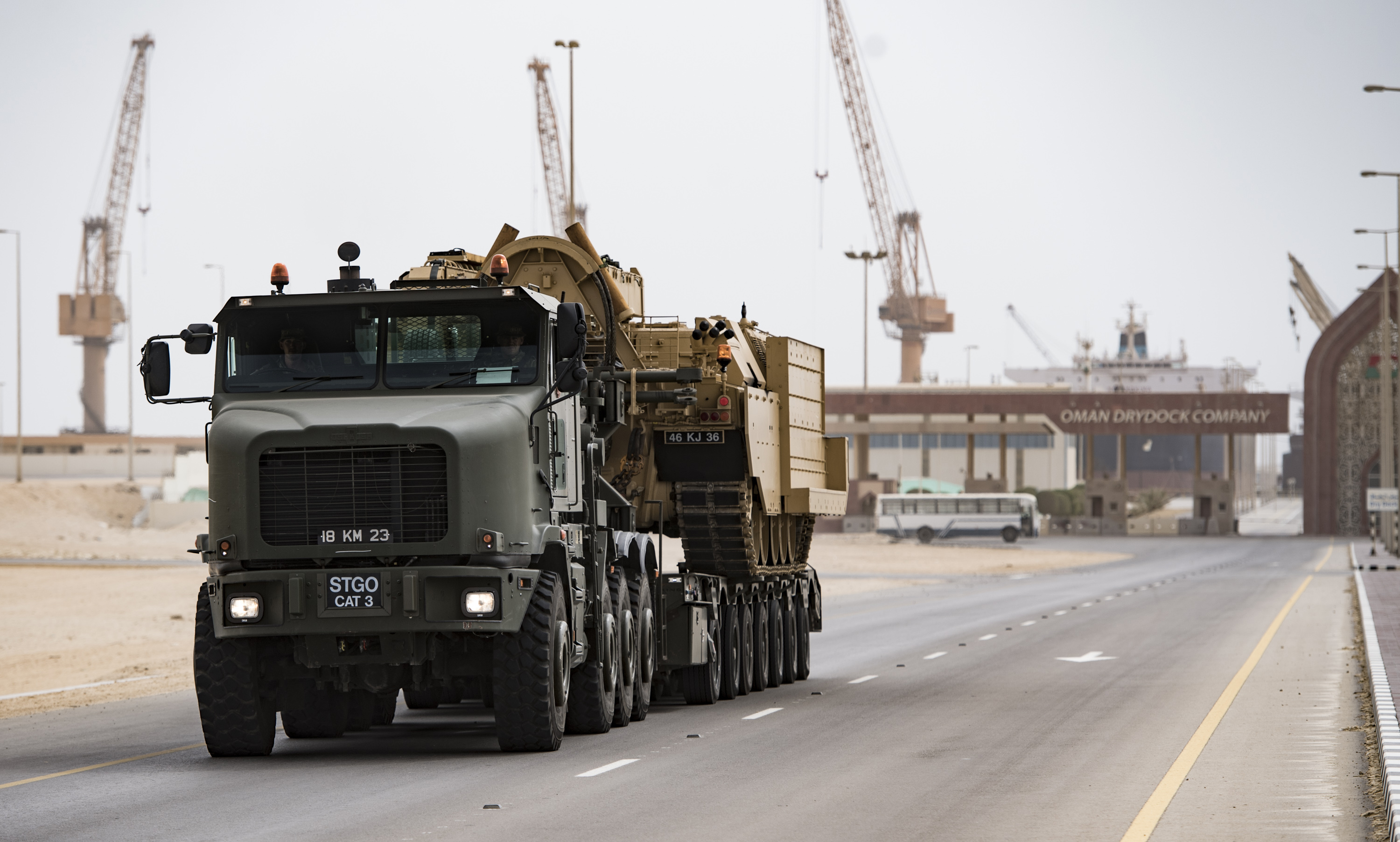
- A British armoured vehicle being transported from UKJLSB by an Oshkosh 1070F to Exercise Saif Sareea 3.

Site information
- Type: Military logistics support base
- Owner: United Kingdom, Ministry of Defence
- Operator: British Armed Forces, (United Kingdom) Royal Navy
- Controlled by: Strategic Command
- Condition: Operational

Location
- Coordinates: 19°40′07″N 57°42′22″E

Site history
- Built: 2017; 9 years ago
- Built by: Babcock International
- In use: 2018–present

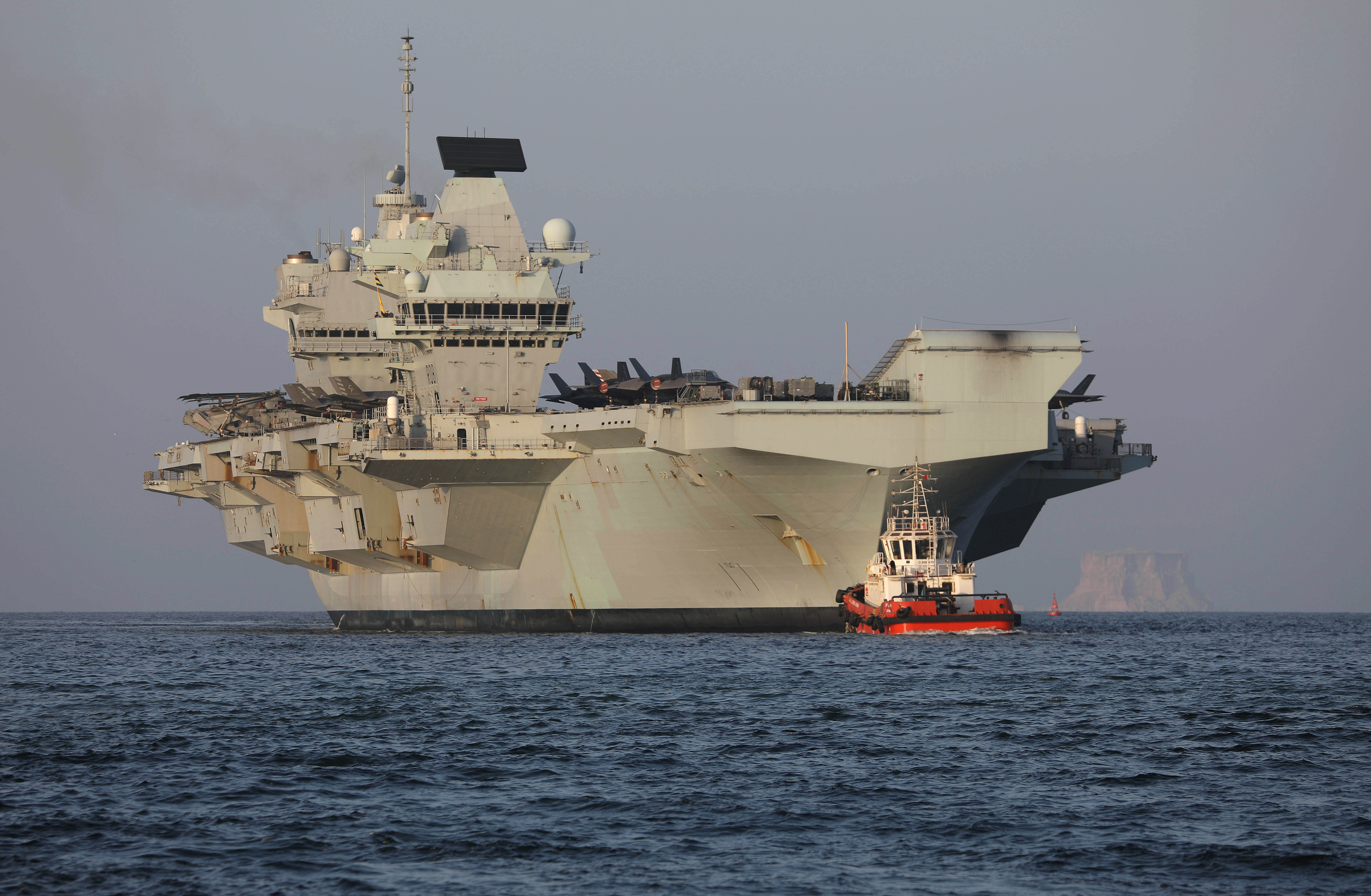
HMS Queen Elizabeth arriving at Duqm Port, Oman in November 2021.

The United Kingdom Joint Logistics Support Base (UKJLSB) is a military base located within the Al Duqm Port and Drydock of Duqm in the Al Wusta governorate of Oman. As a British overseas military base, it is used to facilitate the deployment of the British Armed Forces in the Persian Gulf and Indian Ocean, along with the wider British maritime operations in the region.

== History ==
In March 2016, the British government secured a joint venture between the British-based Babcock International and the Omani-based Oman Drydock Company to develop the Al Duqm Port & Drydock into a strategic port capable of supporting naval operations. In late August 2017, following a signed a Memorandum of Understanding and Services Agreement by Sir Michael Fallon, the then British Defence Secretary, an agreement was subsequently announced to construct logistical support infrastructure especially for the British Armed Forces, named the United Kingdom Joint Logistics Support Base (UKJLSB). The location was chosen by the United Kingdom (UK) due to its strategic position, which is east of the Suez Canal but outside the Persian Gulf. It is part of the UK's wider foreign policy strategy to re-engage globally after Brexit, in particular within the Middle East and Asia-Pacific. Other British military bases within the region include HMS Jufair and RAF Al Udeid, which are located in Bahrain and Qatar, respectively. Prior to construction, the Royal Navy (RN) helped survey the approaches to the harbour.

Following construction by Babcock International, the UKJLSB was officially opened in October 2018, and was used during Exercise Saif Sareea 3 (Swift Sword 3), the largest British military exercise in the region for over 15 years. The base is large enough to accommodate the Royal Navy's nuclear submarines and Queen Elizabeth-class aircraft carriers, which will utilise the facilities operationally from 2021. Dry dock facilities large enough to accommodate the aircraft carriers are also available for use. As a joint base, it is controlled by Strategic Command (previously Joint Forces Command), and is currently leased for 37 years.

During a trip to the Middle East in September 2020, British Secretary of State for Defence, Ben Wallace, announced that the UKJLSB would be tripled in size, following a £23.8 million investment to better facilitate British Army training. Another facility, a joint training area, was also established in the nearby Ras Madrakah training area, named the Omani-British Joint Training Area, in 2019.

In January 2021, the Type 23 frigate HMS Montrose became the first Royal Navy ship to be overhauled at the facility. In November 2021, the base hosted HMS Queen Elizabeth and her carrier strike group for the first time, prior to their participation in joint military training with Omani forces. From 2023, the base was to have been the principal facility for vessels of the British task group, Littoral Response Group (South).

== See also ==
- Omani-British Joint Training Area
- British foreign policy in the Middle East
- East of Suez
