= 2020 in Brunei =

- Decades: 2000s; 2010s; 2020s
- See also: Other events of 2020; Timeline of Bruneian history

Events in the year 2020 in Brunei.

== Incumbents ==
Photo	Post	Name
	Sultan of Brunei	Hassanal Bolkiah

== Events ==
Ongoing — COVID-19 pandemic in Brunei

- 9 March – The Ministry of Health confirms the first case of COVID-19.
- 15 March – The Bruneian Government barred all citizens and foreign residents from leaving as a result of the COVID-19 pandemic. Mass gatherings are also banned.
- 31 March – Kristal-Astro, sole operator of Brunei's multi-channel pay-TV service shuts down after 22 years in operation due to 'fast-changing technology trends'.
- 2 June – Most schools partially reopened and the majority of classes resumed as normal.

== Sports ==
- 28 July – 8 August: Brunei at the 2022 Commonwealth Games
- The Football Association of Brunei Darussalam suspends all games due to the COVID-19 pandemic.

== Death ==
- 24 October – Prince Azim of Brunei, 38, Bruneian royal and film producer (You're Not You)
