= 2013 in Brunei =

- Decades: 1990s; 2000s; 2010s; 2020s
- See also: Other events of 2013; Timeline of Bruneian history

The following lists events that happened during 2013 in Brunei Darussalam.

== Events ==
- The Royal Brunei Air Force (RBAirF) receive the first of twelve Poland-manufactured Sikorsky S-70i Blackhawk helicopters, to replace their ten ageing Bell 212 helicopters.

=== April ===
- April 7 — Taiwan plans to expand a pier on one of the disputed Spratly Islands, parts of which are also claimed by Vietnam, Brunei, China, Malaysia, and the Philippines, as the other claimants strengthen military deployment in the South China Sea.

=== October ===
- October 9 — the 25th Association of Southeast Asian Nations summit and 8th East Asia Summit are held in Brunei.

=== December ===
December 3 to 7 — the fourth edition of the biannual military trade fair, BRIDEX 2013 took place, co-located at the BRIDEX International Conference Centre and Royal Brunei Air Force Base, Rimba.
