= 2012 in Brunei =

- Decades: 1990s; 2000s; 2010s; 2020s
- See also: Other events of 2012; Timeline of Bruneian history

The following lists events that happened during 2012 in Brunei Darussalam.

== Events ==
=== July ===
- July 21 - a RBAirF Bell 212 was due to return to the airbase later that same morning, but subsequently was found crashed with the loss of 12 out of 14 military personnel in Rampayoh, Mukim Labi. Investigations by the Supreme Board of Inquiry of the Royal Brunei Armed Forces (RBAF) concluded that the crash was caused by human error whilst in flight; specifically 'unauthorised low-level flying' which resulted in a controlled flight into terrain (CFIT).
