= 2014 in Brunei =

- Decades: 1990s; 2000s; 2010s; 2020s
- See also: Other events of 2014; Timeline of Bruneian history

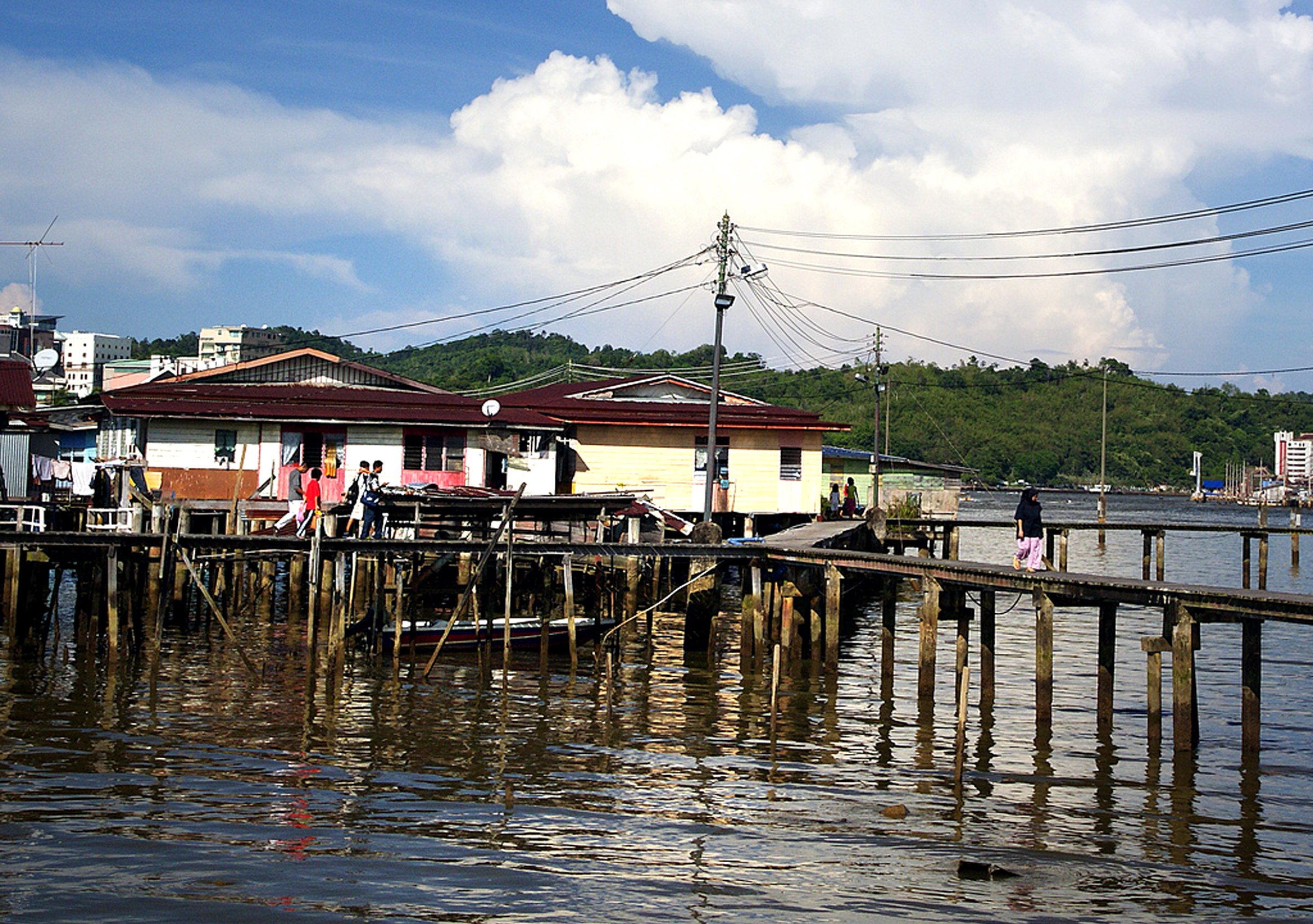
The village of Brunei

The following lists events that happened during 2014 in Brunei.

== Events ==
- The National Service Programme, (Malay: Program Khidmat Bakti Negara - PKBN), a voluntary programme for Bruneian youths was made permanent in 2014, following its pilot study.

=== April ===
- April 30 — the Sultan of Brunei has announced a controversial new penal code that will eventually include stoning, amputation, and flogging as punishments; as 'Phase one' of Islamic law.
