= 2019 in Brunei =

- Decades: 1990s; 2000s; 2010s; 2020s
- See also: Other events of 2019; Timeline of Bruneian history

Events in the year 2019 in Brunei.

== Incumbents ==
| Photo | Post | Name |
|---|---|---|
| | Sultan of Brunei | Hassanal Bolkiah |

== Events ==
- September – Brunei was affected by the 2019 Southeast Asian haze.

== Sports ==
- The Brunei Continental Cycling Team was founded.
- Kuala Belait FC was founded.
