= Exercise Saif Sareea =

Series of joint military exercises held by the United Kingdom and Oman

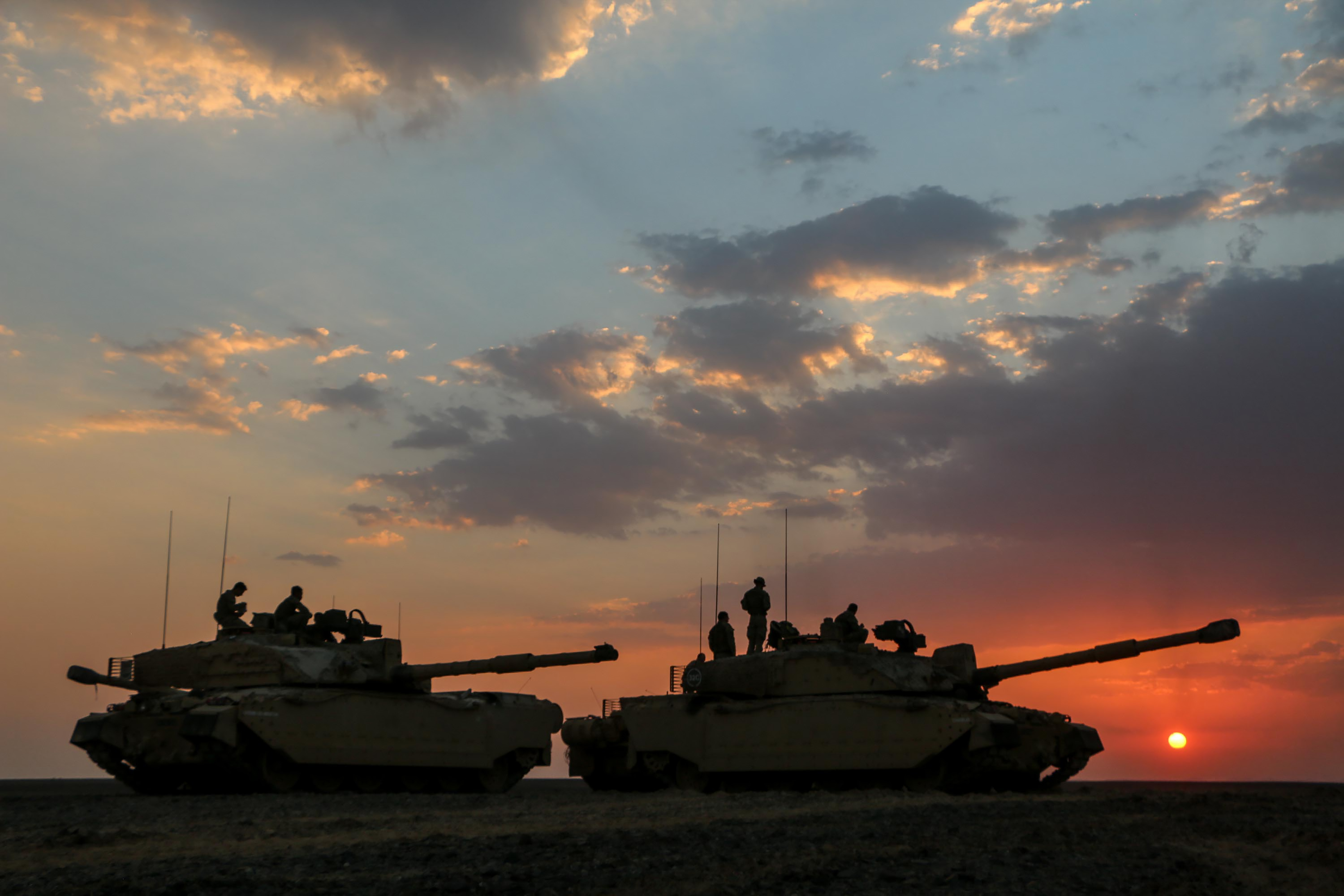
- British and Omani Challenger 2 tanks during Exercise Saif Sareea 3 in 2018.
- Location: Oman
- Objective: Demonstrate the UK's ability to conduct a strategic deployment of a warfighting force to the Middle East.; Strengthen the UK's relationship with Oman and assist in the development of its military capabilities.
- Date: Saif Sareea 1; 15 November 1986 - 8 December 1986 Saif Sareea 2; 15 September 2001 - 26 October 2001 Saif Sareea 3; 5 October 2018 - 3 November 2018
- Executed by: United Kingdom; Oman

Exercise Saif Sareea (Arabic: سيف سريع, lit. 'Swift Sword') is a series of military exercises undertaken by the United Kingdom and Oman which first began in 1986 and most recently took place in 2018.

== Saif Sareea 1 ==
Exercise Saif Sareea 1 was the first exercise held between 15 November and 8 December 1986. Nearly 5,000 British military personnel deployed for the exercise. Units that took part from the British Army included elements of 5th Airborne Brigade and 3 Commando Brigade. It also involved ships from the Royal Navy task group, and a detachment of Tornado GR1 and FR3 aircraft and air transport resources from the Royal Air Force. The exercise was the largest deployment to the Middle East in a single operation by the UK since the Suez Crisis in 1956.

The joint headquarters for the exercise was at RAFO Masirah airbase, on Masirah Island in Oman. The exercise involved a demonstration parachute drop by 5th Airborne Brigade on a desert airstrip, with air support from the Tornado aircraft, and Omani Hunter aircraft forming the opposing force.

== Saif Sareea 2 ==
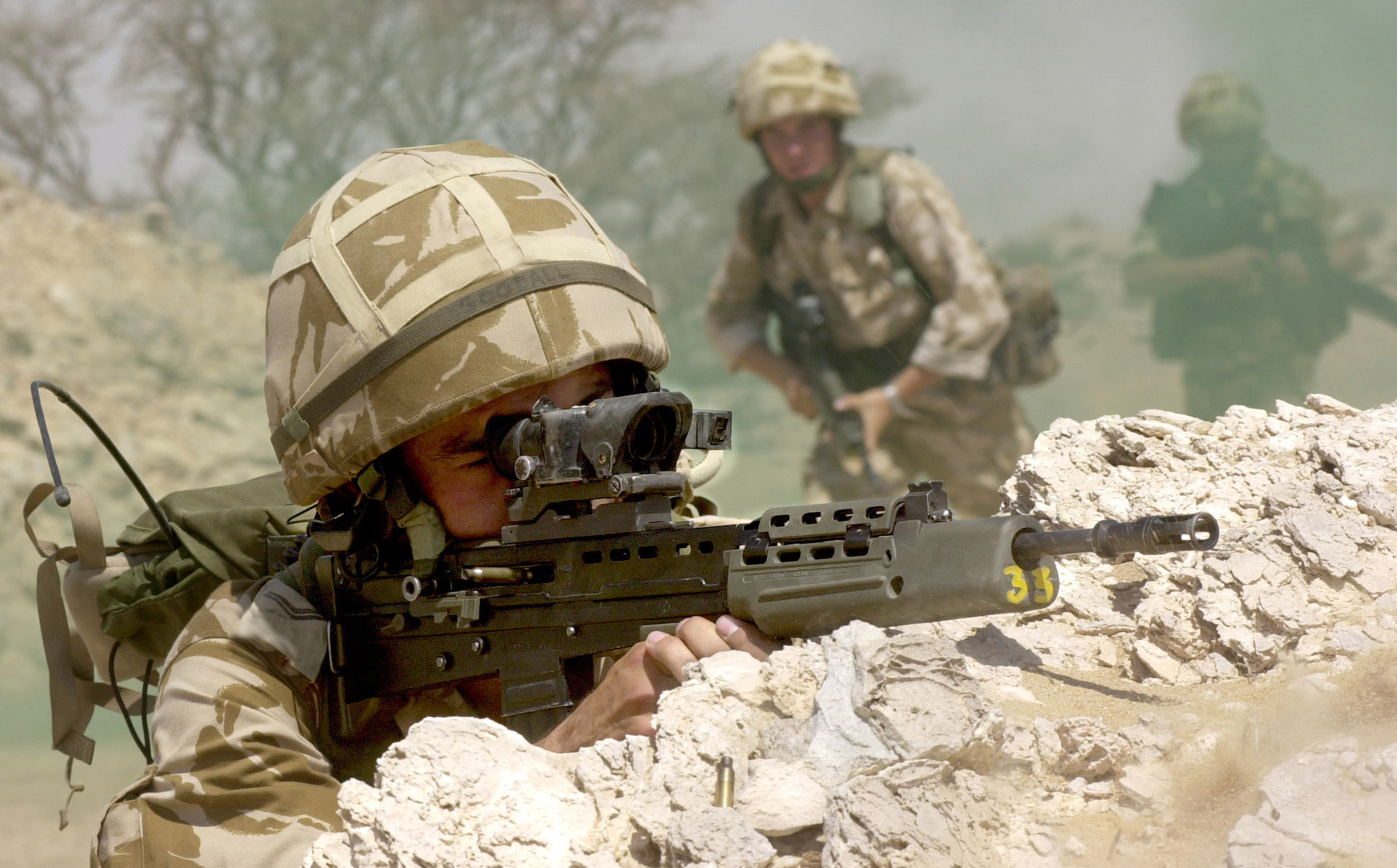
A British soldier with an SA80 assault rifle participating in the exercise.

Exercise Saif Sareea 2 was the second and largest Saif Sareea exercise which was held between 15 August and 26 October 2001. It was the largest single deployment of the British Armed Forces since the Gulf War in 1991 and trialed the newly-formed Joint Rapid Reaction Force. Over 22,500 personnel, 6,500 vehicles, 21 naval vessels, 49 fixed-wing aircraft and 44 helicopters were deployed; compared with the previous largest force of around 5,000 personnel. In addition over 11,000 Omani forces took part.

=== Results ===
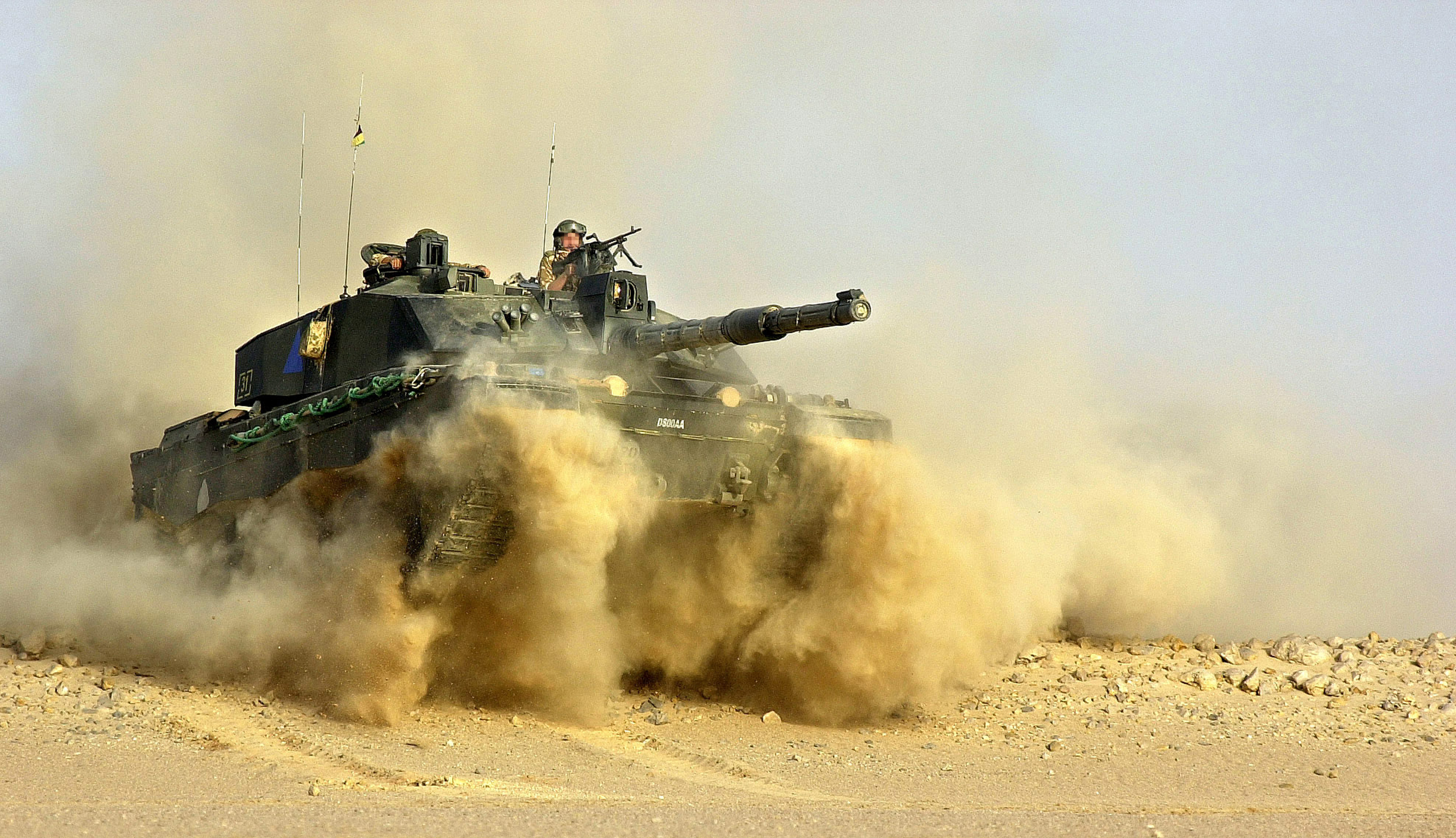
A Challenger 2 tank at speed during the exercise, located to the north of Thumrait.

This exercise illustrated a number of problems in the British Army; the traditional "make-do" attitude to shortages of modern equipment and essential spares fell down in the face of the Omani weather.

- Soldiers reported their uniform was too hot and those who had not been issued with desert boots suffered from foot problems as their combat boots melted in the heat.
- The 66 Challenger 2 tanks suffered from poor reliability. This was not due to any inherent defect with the tank, but rather due to the failure of the Army to adequately 'desertise' the tanks (apparently on grounds of cost). The failure to fit appropriate filters led to substantial engine damage due to the ingress of sand and dust. Two squadrons of tanks were withdrawn from the exercise.
- The SA80A1 rifle (the unmodified variant) suffered stoppages and jamming due to sand and dust ingress.
- Westland Lynx helicopters became unserviceable as their rotor blades' flying time was reduced from 500 hours to 27 hours.
- The Clansman radio system performed so poorly it was judged "incapable" of operating in combat. Unable to communicate by radio and with no mobile phone service, tank commanders had to pull up during manoeuvres to check orders with each other.
- Plastic filters on the AS-90 self-propelled artillery melted in the heat, rendering the gun useless.
- Some of the Army's trucks were so old that the only way to keep the engines from overheating was to turn the cabin heaters on full, which meant the drivers had to get out every few minutes because of the heat.

Some of these problems - mostly with Challenger 2 and the AS-90 self-propelled gun were fixed in time for the invasion of Iraq in 2003.

Some equipment performed extremely well in the operation.

- The recently introduced C-17 provided a level of strategic lift not previously available to the RAF.

A report by the National Audit Office stated that "given that the joint rapid reaction forces are intended to be able to operate anywhere in the world, it is a concern that the MoD does not hold sufficient stocks of desert combat suits to equip the Forces." Despite these myriad problems, the MoD called the exercise a "success" and said that "the key point of major exercises is that they allow us to identify the challenges our forces might face when actually operating in such testing conditions. We have made comprehensive arrangements for identifying lessons and, where necessary, we will make improvements to our equipment and procedures." The House of Commons Committee of Public Accounts concluded that the exercise had been of benefit to the subsequent British invasion of Iraq, Operation TELIC.

=== Equipment ===
==== Royal Air Force ====
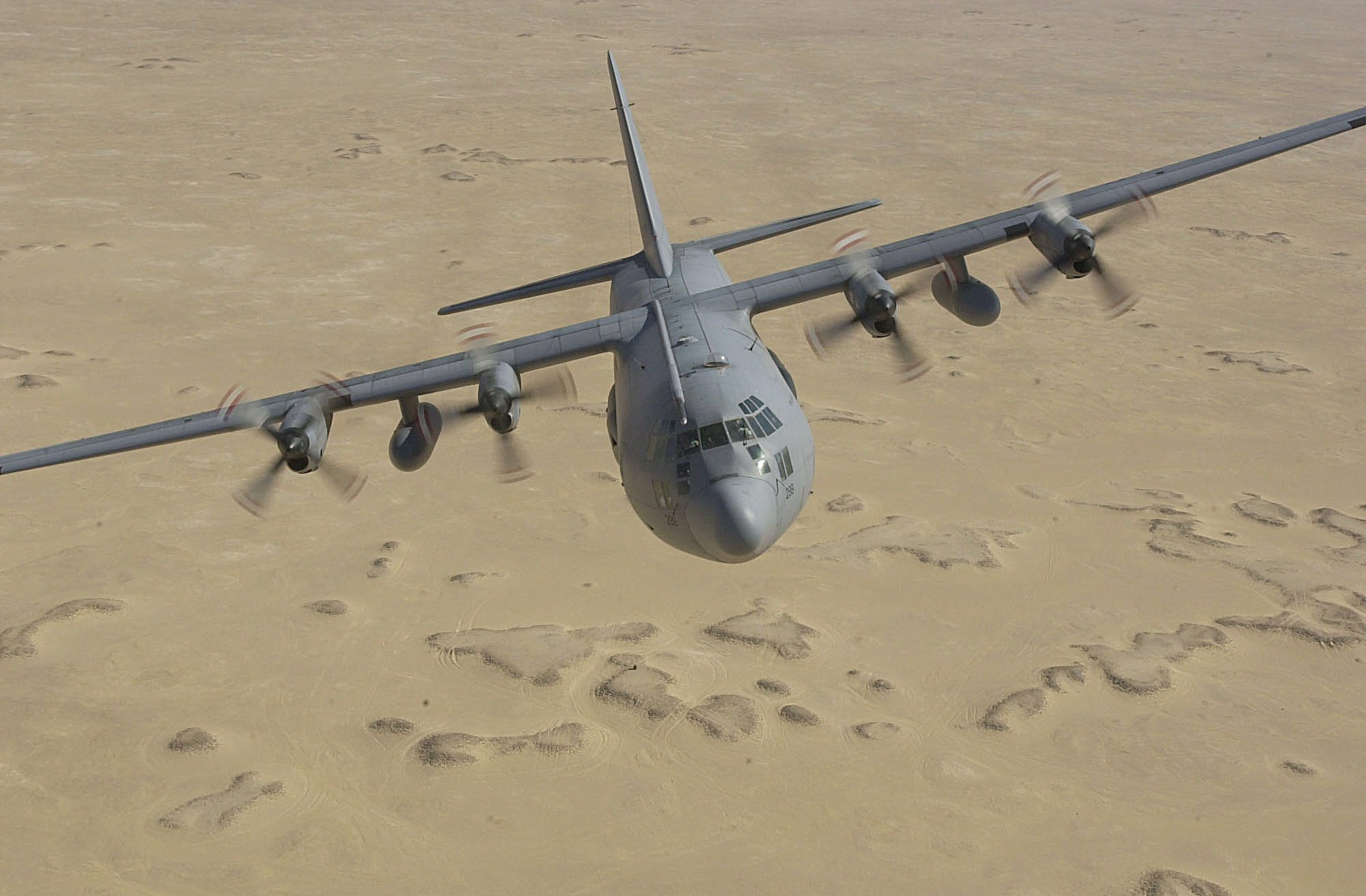
An RAF C-130 Hercules participating in the exercise.

- Tornado GR4 (strike aircraft)
- Harrier GR7 (strike aircraft)
- Tornado F3 (fighter)
- Chinook (transport helicopter)
- Sentry AEW1 (airborne early warning)
- Puma HC1 (transport helicopter)
- C-130 Hercules (transport aircraft)
- VC10 (transport aircraft/aerial refueling tanker)
- Nimrod MR2 (anti-submarine warfare)
- Falcon 20EW (Operated by F R Aviation in support of RAF assets)

==== Royal Navy ====
- HMS Illustrious (R06) (aircraft carrier)
- HMS Ocean (L12) (landing platform helicopter)
- HMS Fearless (L10) (landing platform dock)
- HMS Cornwall (F99) (frigate)
- HMS Marlborough (F233) (frigate)
- HMS Monmouth (F235) (frigate)
- HMS Southampton (D90) (destroyer)
- HMS Nottingham (D91) (destroyer)
- HMS Inverness (M102) (minehunter)
- HMS Cattistock (M31) (minehunter)
- HMS Quorn (M41) (minehunter)
- HMS Walney (M104) (minehunter)
- HMS Beagle (A319) (survey vessel)
- HMS Roebuck (H130) (survey vessel)
- RFA Fort Victoria (replenishment ship)
- RFA Fort Rosalie (replenishment ship)
- RFA Sir Tristram (landing ship logistics)
- RFA Sir Galahad (landing ship logistics)
- RFA Sir Percivale (landing ship logistics)
- RFA Sir Bedivere (landing ship logistics)
- RFA Oakleaf (replenishment ship)
- FA2 Sea Harrier (strike fighter)
- Sea King HAS Mk6 (anti-submarine warfare helicopter)
- Sea King Mk4 (transport helicopter)
- Lynx Mk7 (utility helicopter)
- Sea King AEW Mk 2 (airborne early warning)

==== British Army ====
- Challenger 2 (main battle tank)
- Lynx AH7 (utility helicopter)
- Gazelle AH1 (scout helicopter)

== Saif Sareea 3 ==
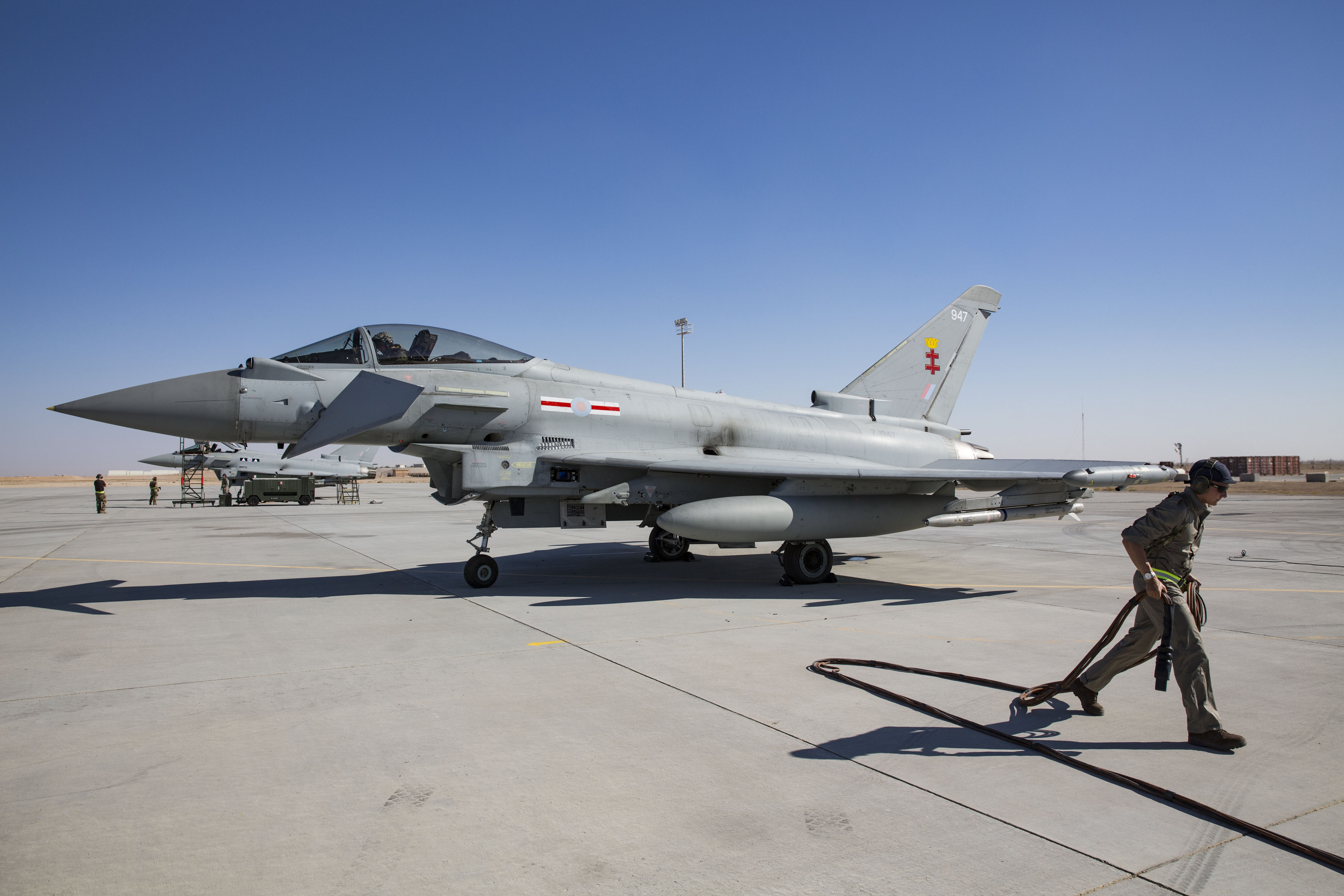
RAF Typhoons conducted sorties from RAFO Thumrait in Oman.

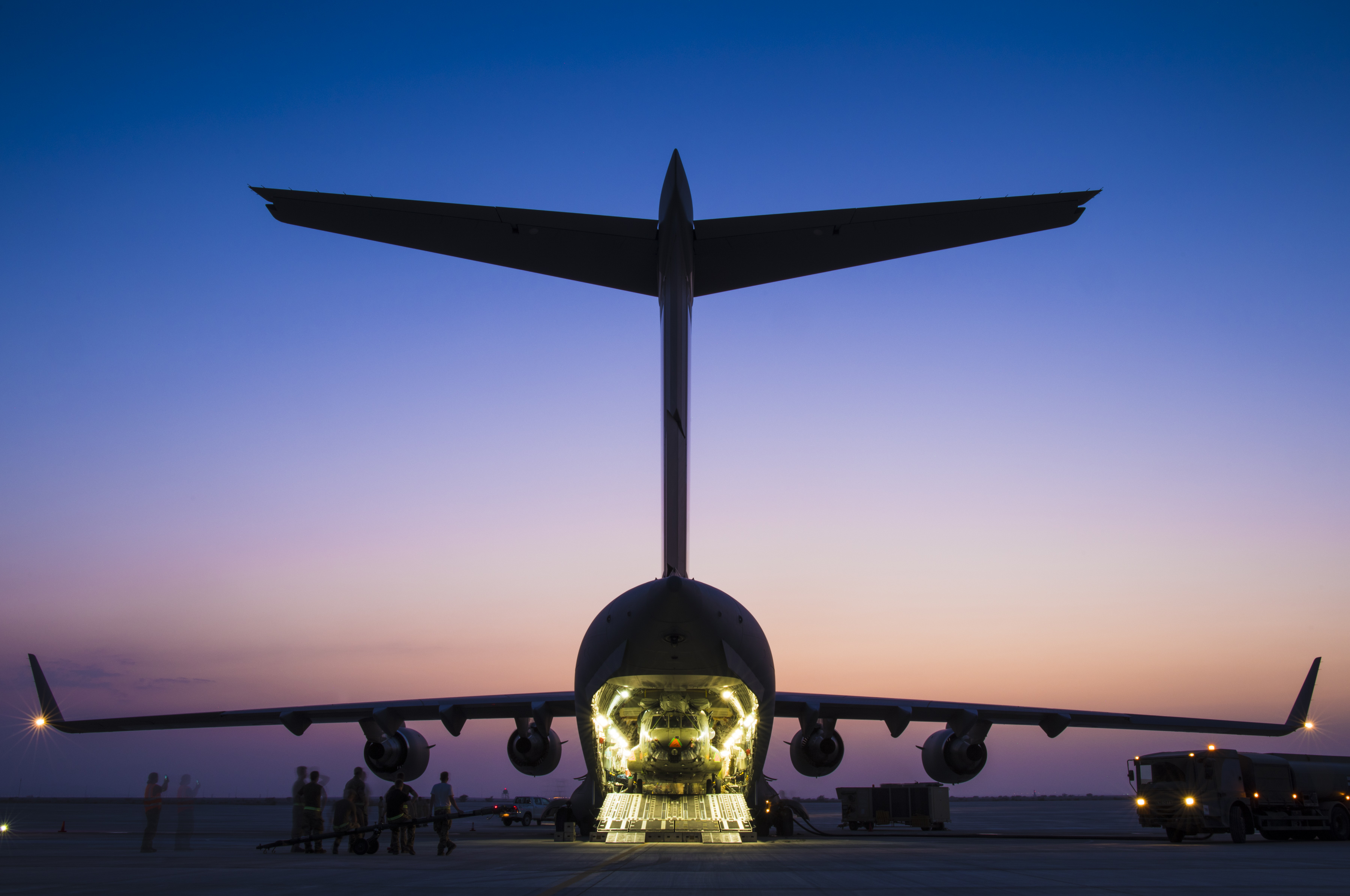
An RAF C-17 prepares to unload an RAF Chinook.

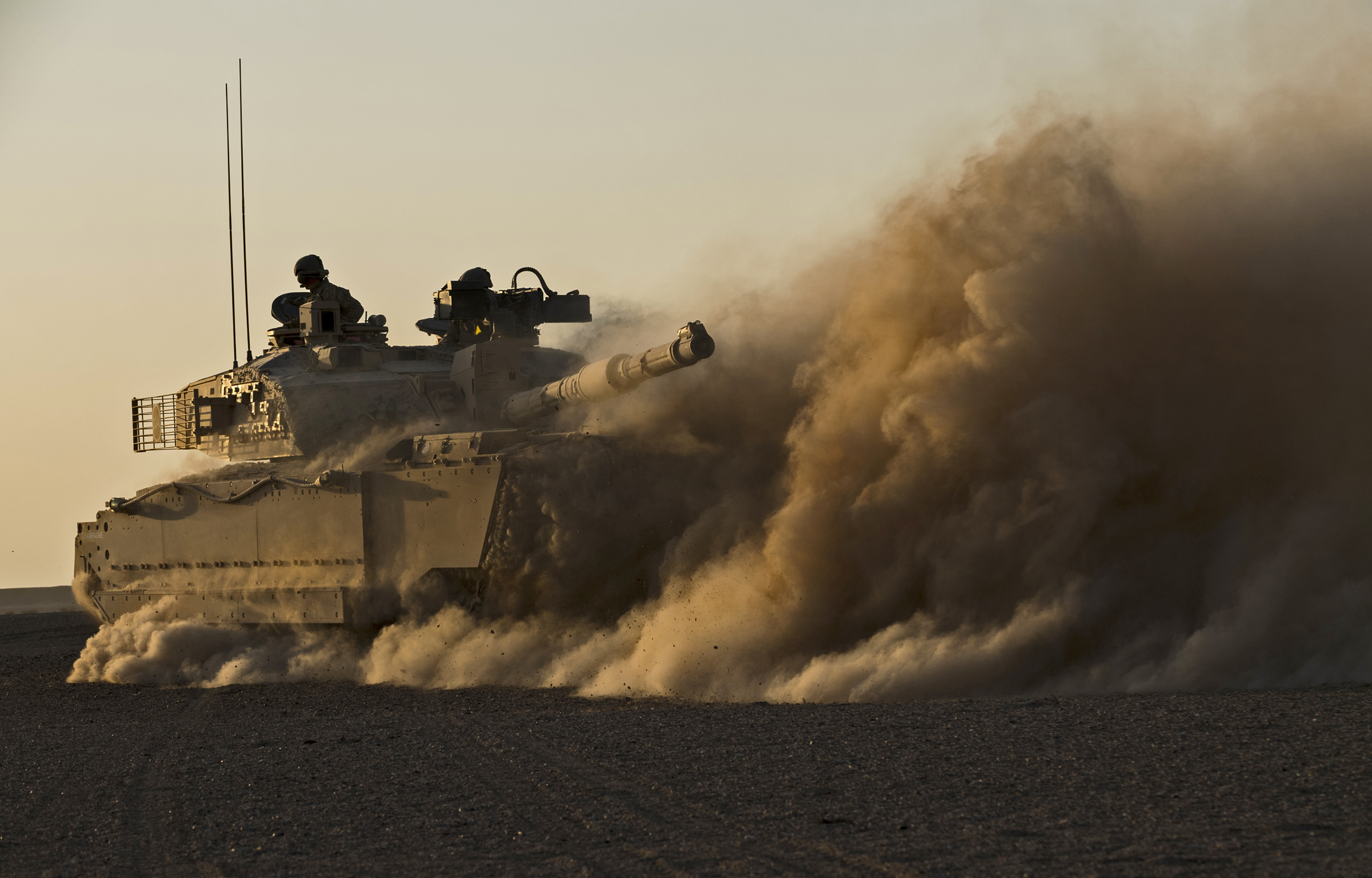
A Challenger 2 of the 1st Royal Tank Regiment crossing the Omani desert.

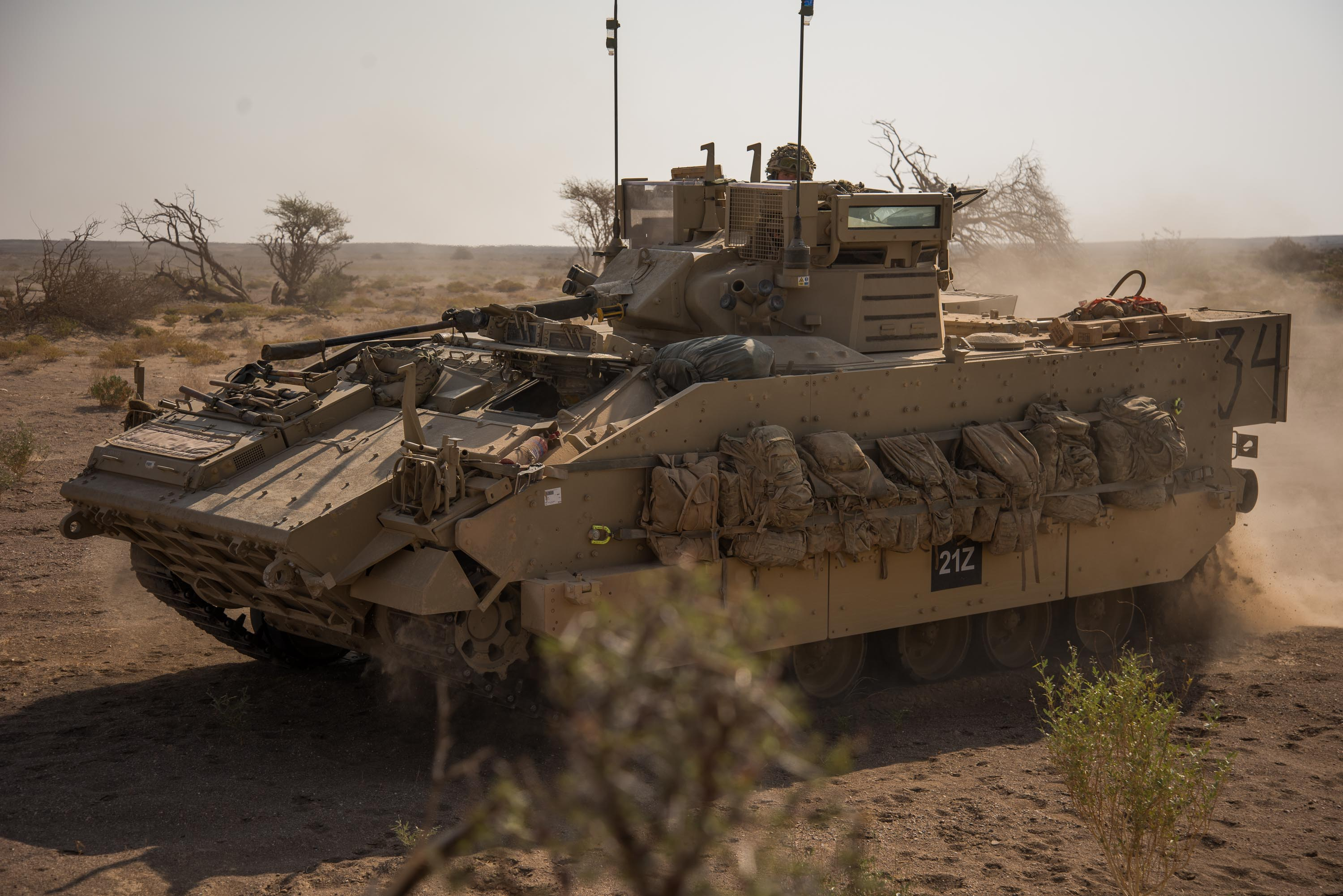
A Warrior infantry fighting vehicle of the 1 MERCIAN battlegroup.

Exercise Saif Sareea 3 was the third exercise held between 5 October and 3 November 2018. It was the UK's largest deployment to Oman since the previous Saif Sareea exercise 17 years before. Over 70,000 personnel from the Sultan of Oman's Armed Forces took part, as well as 5,500 from the British Armed Forces. The exercise lasted 10 days and consisted of five phases: Phase 1 involved the deployment from the UK to Oman of 2,000 soldiers and 185 armoured fighting vehicles, which was followed by Phase 2 consisting of national forces training. Phase 3 saw the integration of the UK Battle Group with Omani forces, followed by Phase 4, a final test exercise. The exercise culminated in Phase 5 which involved a firepower demonstration showcasing the combined effects of UK and Omani forces with a beach assault, aided by naval gunfire support, and a display of airborne firepower. The exercise's simulated enemy was Russia.

The exercise was the first to be facilitated by the newly-established UK Joint Logistics Support Base in Al Duqm Port & Drydock, Oman. It ran concurrently with the UK's involvement in Exercise Trident Juncture 2018, a NATO exercise in Norway.

=== Equipment ===
==== Royal Air Force ====
- 8 × Typhoon FGR4 (multirole fighter) (No. 2 Squadron RAF)
- 3 × Chinook HC6 (transport helicopter) (No. 27 Squadron RAF)
- 3 × Puma HC2 (transport helicopter) (No. 230 Squadron RAF)
- 2 × Sentry AEW1 (airborne early warning) (No. 8 Squadron RAF)
- 2 × Voyager KC3 (aerial refueling tanker)
- 1 × Atlas C1 (transport aircraft)
- 2 × C-17 Globemaster III (transport aircraft) (No. 99 Squadron RAF)
- 1 × BAe 146 (transport aircraft)
- Foxhound, Panther and Jackal armoured vehicles (No. 1 Squadron RAF Regiment)

==== Royal Navy ====
- HMS Albion (L14) (landing platform dock)
- HMS Dragon (D35) (destroyer)
- HMS Blyth (M111) (minehunter)
- HMS Ledbury (M30) (minehunter)
- RFA Cardigan Bay (L3009) (landing ship dock)
- RFA Lyme Bay (L3007) (landing ship dock)
- MV Anvil Point (sealift ship)

==== British Army ====
- 18 × Challenger 2 (main battle tank)
- 61 × Warrior (armoured fighting vehicle)
- 43 × Scimitar (armoured fighting vehicle)
- 4 × AS-90 (self-propelled artillery)
- 54 × Bulldog (armoured personnel carrier)
- 3 × Apache AH1 (attack helicopter) (No. 664 Squadron AAC)
- Wildcat AH1 (utility helicopter) (No. 659 Squadron AAC)

The smaller scale of Saif Sareea 3 has been blamed on defence cuts, however, whilst the exercise was undeniably smaller than previous exercises, this has been attributed to the greater capability of newer equipment. Saif Sareea 2, for example, involved six landing ships but these were old, smaller and far less capable than the newer Albion and Bay-class landing ships involved in Saif Sareea 3. The Albion class of landing ships have now all been withdrawn and as of mid 2026 have not been replaced.
