= Duqm Port =

Seaport in central-eastern Oman

Port of Duqm
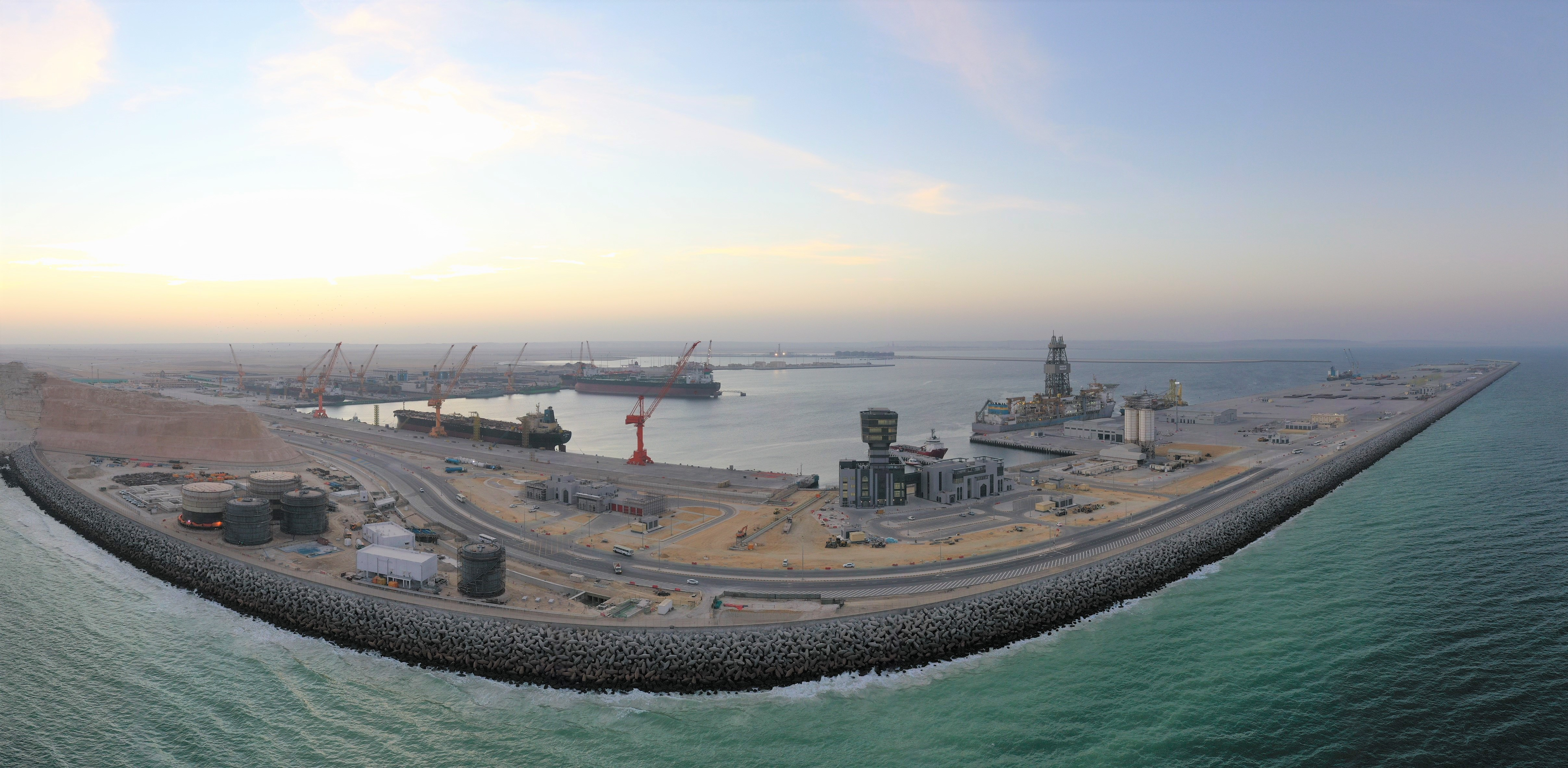
- Port of Duqm
- Interactive map of Port of Duqm
- Port of Duqm location in Oman
- Native name: ميناء الدقم (Arabic)

Location
- Country: Oman
- Location: Duqm, Al Wusta Governorate
- Coordinates: 19°39′N 57°42′E
- UN/LOCODE: OM DQM

Details
- Opened: 2012; 14 years ago
- Operated by: Oman Dry Dock Company (SAOC)
- Owned by: Government of Oman
- Type of Harbor: Commercial and military
- Land area: 453,000 square metres (112 acres)
- Size: 2,200 metres (7,200 feet) quay 2,800 metres (9,200 feet) total
- No. of berths: nine
- Draft depth: 10 metres (33 feet)
- Cranes: 14 sets of jib cranes
- Docks: two graving docks
- Ship capacity: 600,000 tonnes (661,387 tons)
- Environmental standard: MARPOL compliance

Statistics
- Annual TEU: 1.5 million
- Annual revenue: US$ 1.5 billion
- Website https://portofduqm.om

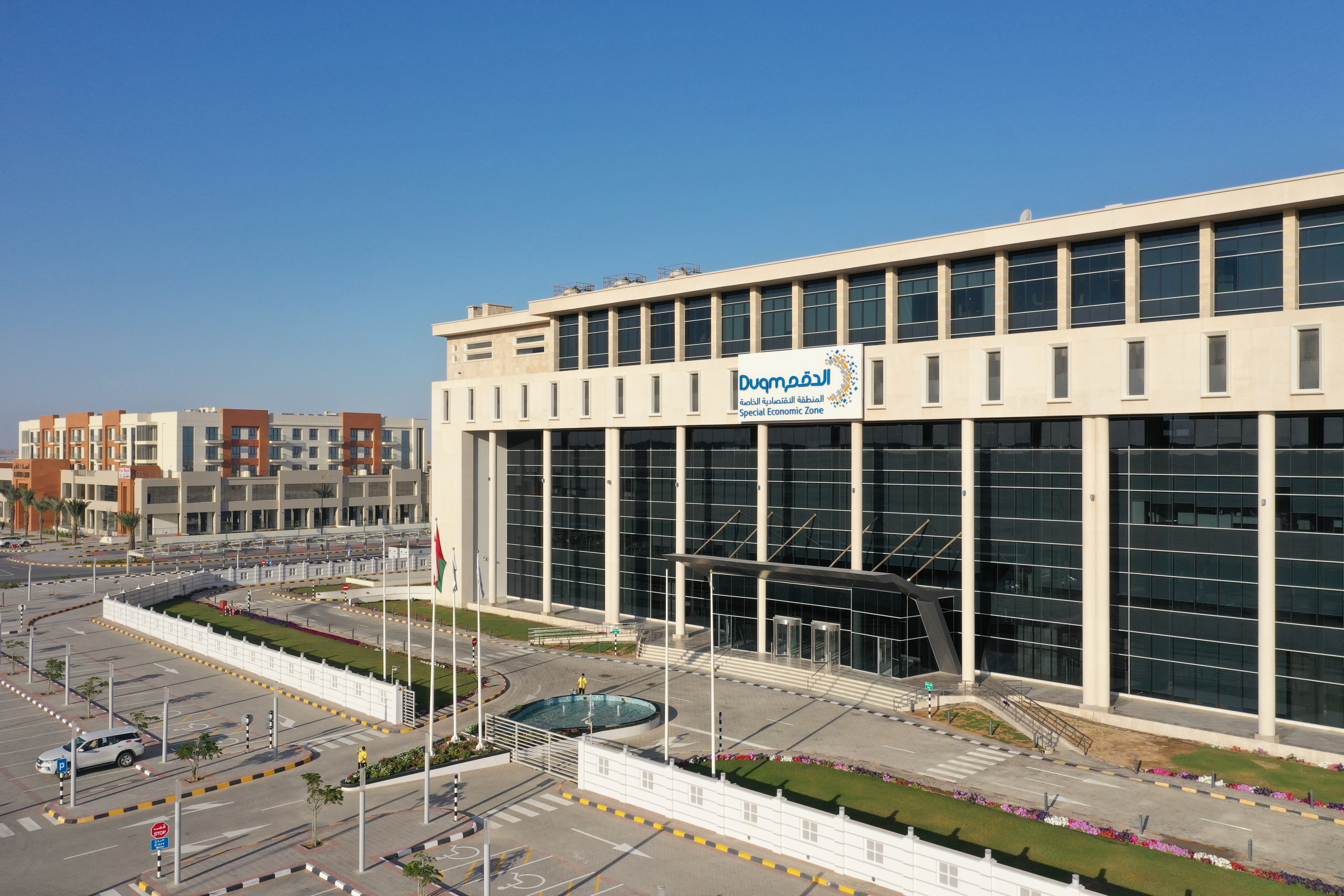
The Port of Duqm is integrated in the Special Economic Zone at Duqm (SEZAD)

The Port of Duqm, also known as Duqm Port, is a seaport and road terminal located at Duqm in the Al Wusta governorate of Oman. Duqm Port, integrated in the Special Economic Zone at Duqm (SEZAD), and located 550 kilometres (342 miles) south of capital Muscat, is equipped with a ship repair yard and dry dock facility. Overlooking the Arabian Sea and the Indian Ocean, the Port of Duqm is a joint-venture between ASYAD Ports and Consortium Antwerp Port. Although operating since 2012, it was not officially opened until 4 February 2022 by Mr. Asa'ad bin Tariq Al Said, Deputy Prime Minister for International Relations and Cooperation Affairs and Personal Representative of His Majesty the Sultan of Oman.

The Port of Duqm has a total area of 188 square kilometres (73 square miles), and includes land for industry, an oil storage terminal, commercial and government berths, a dry dock, and associated logistical lands. It is protected by a main breakwater and a secondary one; the height of the main breakwater is 11 metres (36 feet) above sea level and more than 22 metres (72 feet) on average to the sea floor, and is 4.1 kilometres (3 miles) in length. The length of the secondary breakwater is 4.6 kilometres (3 miles).

Its commercial berth has four stations, including two container terminals with a length of about 1,600 metres (5,249 feet) and an annual capacity to handle about 3.5 million standard containers, a terminal for dry bulk materials with an annual capacity of about 5,000,000 tonnes (5,511,557 tons), and a multi-use terminal with an annual capacity of about 800,000 tonnes (881,849 tons) and a Ro-Ro capacity of 200,000 cars per annum.

== International agreements ==
In August 2017, the Oman and the United Kingdom (UK) governments jointly established the UK Joint Logistics Support Base (UKJLSB) at Duqm Port. The port has sufficient space and depth to berth the Royal Navy's latest Queen Elizabeth-class aircraft carriers. In 2018, the port was used for Exercise Saif Sareea 3 (Exercise Swift Sword 3), a 10-day long, bilateral tri-service military exercise. Also in 2018, the Indian government announced that it would use Duqm Port for maintenance of Indian military vessels.

In March 2019, the United States embassy announced an agreement for USA access to the ports at Salalah and Duqm. In September 2020, the UK Defence Secretary announced a plan to triple the size of its UK Joint Logistics Support Base at the Omani port, with a further £23.8 million investment.

== Dry dock ==
The dry dock complex, originally known as Oman Drydock Company, now known as Asyad Drydock, includes ship repair and maintenance facilities. It was opened a year before the main port in 2011. In 2021, the yard completed the build of its first ship, an Omani-owned logistics support ship.

== See also ==
- Duqm Airport
- Duqm Refinery
- Port of Antwerp-Bruges
