= 2024 in Brunei =

- Decades: 2000s; 2010s; 2020s
- See also: Other events of 2024; Timeline of Bruneian history

The following lists events that happened during 2024 in Brunei.

== Incumbents ==
Photo	Post	Name
	Sultan of Brunei	Hassanal Bolkiah

== Events ==
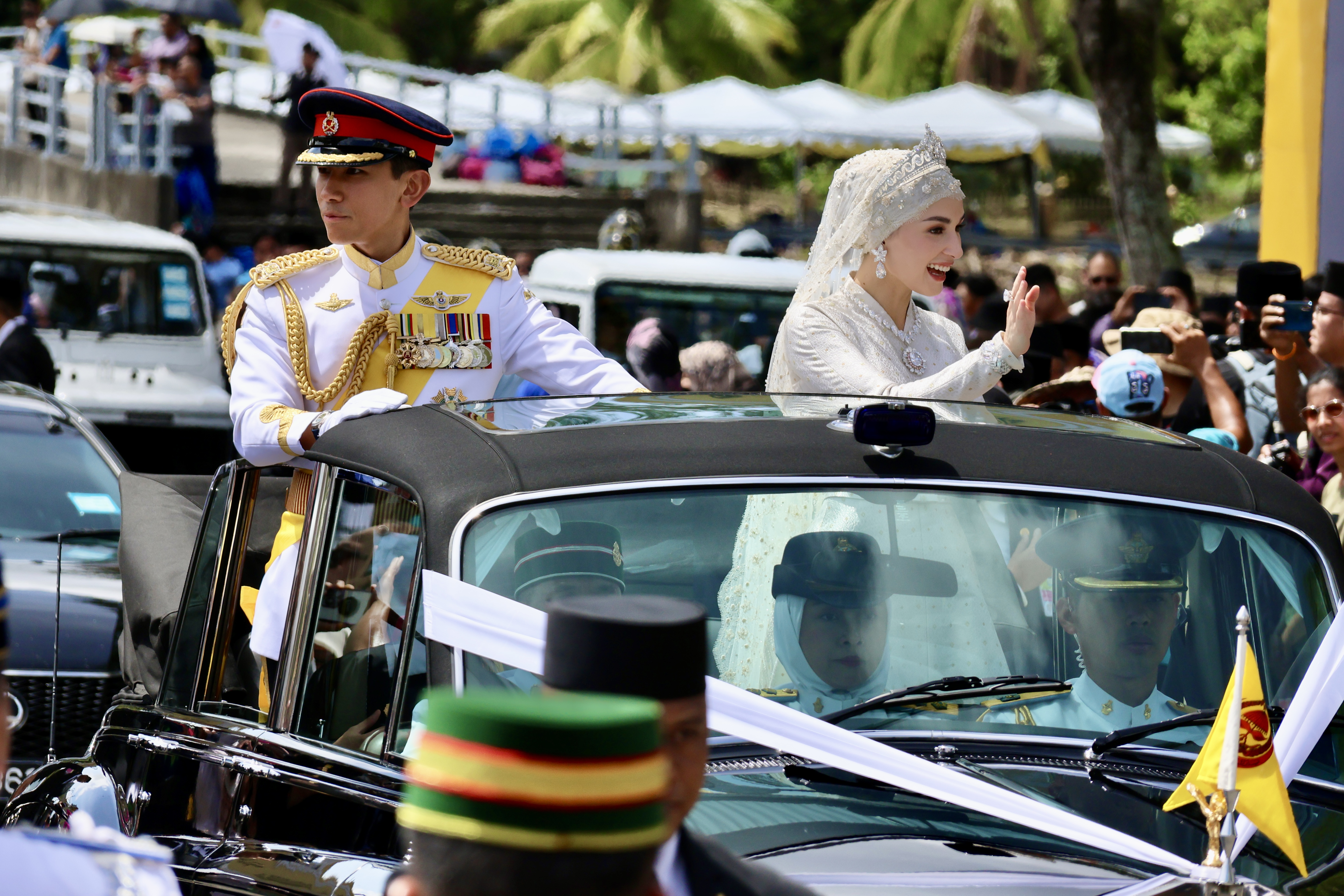
Wedding ceremony of Prince Abdul Mateen and Anisha Rosnah

=== January ===
- 7–16 January – Wedding ceremony of Prince Abdul Mateen and Anisha Rosnah.
- 24–28 January – 28th Consumer Fair held at International Convention Centre, Berakas.
  - 27 January – Meet the Legends event featuring John Arne Riise and Teddy Sheringham.

=== February ===
- 3–4 February – Ministry of Education's 9th Higher Education Expo held at BRIDEX, Jerudong.
- 14 February – Airbus C-295MW officially entered service with the Royal Brunei Air Force.
- 24 February – 40th National Day of Brunei celebration at Hassanal Bolkiah National Stadium.
- 28 February – Attorney General Ahmad Isa was officially announced to be replaced by Nor Hashimah.

=== March ===
- 9 March – 40th National Day of Brunei celebration's drone show and fireworks displays at Taman Mahkota Jubli Emas. The Ministry of Home Affairs states that the claw machines are prohibited and classified as haram.

=== December ===
- 4 December – The kebaya is recognised as part of UNESCO's Intangible Heritage list.

== Deaths ==
- 2 February – Abdul Hamid Bakal, Member of the Legislative Council. (b. 1939).
