= 2007 in Brunei =

- Decades: 1980s; 1990s; 2000s; 2010s; 2020s
- See also: Other events of 2007; Timeline of Bruneian history

The following lists events that happened during 2007 in Brunei Darussalam.

== Events ==
=== May ===
- May 31 to June 2 – launched by the Ministry of Defence Brunei Darussalam (MinDef), the Brunei Darussalam International Defence Exhibition (BRIDEX), a new military trade fair and exhibition was held at the International Convention Centre.
