= 2025 in Brunei =

- Decades: 2000s; 2010s; 2020s
- See also: Other events of 2025; Timeline of Bruneian history

The following lists events that happened during 2025 in Brunei.

== Incumbents ==
Photo	Post	Name
	Sultan of Brunei	Hassanal Bolkiah

== Holidays ==
- 1 January – New Year's Day
- 27 January – Isra' and Mi'raj
- 29 January – Chinese New Year
- 23 February – National Day
- 1 March – Ramadan
- 18 March – Nuzul Al-Quran
- 30 March to 1 April – Eid al-Fitr Holiday
- 31 May – Armed Forces Day
- 5 June to 9 June — Eid al-Adha
- 26 June – Islamic New Year
- 15 July – His Majesty the Sultan's Birthday
- 5 - 6 September – Prophet Muhammad's Birthday
- 25 December – Christmas Day

== Events ==
- March 6 – Brunei introduces a Long-Term Pass to boost investment and skilled workforce.
- March 7 – Brunei launches the BruneiID initiative.
- March 8 – Brunei starts implementing visa-free entry for Chinese citizens.
- March 9 – The prime minister announces a national fiscal consolidation programme will be implemented on the aspect of national security.
- March 12 – The Royal Brunei Police Force arrest a foreign national suspected of being in a Macau crime syndicate.
- March 26 – Twenty people are arrested in a drug bust in Tutong District.
- November 20–28 – 2025 ASEAN School Games.
- December 9—20 — Brunei at the 2025 SEA Games
