= 2026 in Brunei =

- Decades: 2000s; 2010s; 2020s
- See also: Other events of 2026; Timeline of Bruneian history

The following lists events that happened during 2026 in Brunei.

== Incumbents ==
Photo	Post	Name
	Sultan of Brunei	Hassanal Bolkiah

== Events ==
- 15 April – Sultan Hassanal Bolkiah and Australian Prime Minister Anthony Albanese sign an agreement to supply Bruneian oil and fertilisers to Australia.
- 4 June – Sultan Hassanal Bolkiah implements a cabinet reshuffle that sees the inclusion of his sons Prince Abdul Malik as Minister in the Prime Minister’s Office and Prince Abdul Mateen as foreign minister.

== Holidays ==
- 1 January – New Year's Day
- 16–17 January – Isra' and Mi'raj
- 17 February – Chinese New Year
- 23 February – National Day
- 1 March – Ramadan
- 7 March – Nuzul Al-Quran
- 20–24 March – Eid al-Fitr
- 27 May – Eid al-Adha
- 31 May – Armed Forces Day
- 17 June – Islamic New Year
- 15 July – His Majesty the Sultan's Birthday
- 25 August – Prophet Muhammad's Birthday
- 25 December – Christmas Day
