= National Service Programme =

Voluntary youth service in Brunei Darussalam

Coordinates: 4°42′44″N 115°06′38″E

- Program Khidmat Bakti Negara
- Program Khidmat Bakti Negara badge
- Founded: December 2011; 14 years ago
- Country: Brunei Darussalam
- Allegiance: Sultan of Brunei
- Type: Voluntary national service, military service
- Role: Youth development
- Size: 4,552 alumni
- Headquarters: Batu Apoi Base Camp, Temburong District, Brunei Darussalam
- Nickname: PKBN
- Mottos: Bersedia, Berkhidmat, Berbakti (Ready, Served, Dedicated)
- Colours: blue
- Website: PKBN.gov.bn

Commanders
- Supreme Commander: Sultan Hassanal Bolkiah
- Commandant: Mohammad Dollah

The National Service Programme, (Malay: Program Khidmat Bakti Negara - PKBN), is the voluntary national service programme in Brunei Darussalam for youth citizens aged 16 to 21. The programme lasts three months, and engagement is voluntary. The programme started in December 2011; 14 years ago, as a pilot study, and was made permanent in 2014. It is managed by the Ministry of Culture, Youth and Sports.

== History ==
The idea to establish a national service programme in Brunei Darussalam began in September 2011; 15 years ago, when His Majesty Sultan Hassanal Bolkiah consented for the Ministry of Culture, Youth and Sport to lead in the implementation and introduction of Program Khidmat Bakti Negara (PKBN) as Brunei Darussalam National Service Programme.

To undertake the task, a PKBN Task Force was formed, with members from Prime Minister office, and the following Ministries: Defence, Finance, Education, Health, Industry and Prime Resources, Development, Communication, Home Affairs, Religious Affairs, Culture Youth and Sports, as well as Attorney General's Chamber.

In February 2025, during the Passing Out Parade for the 13th PKBN Intake, His Majesty the Sultan has proposed extending Program Khidmat Bakti Negara (PKBN) training period from 3 months to 6 months to improve discipline, resilience, and skill- building among youth. This initiative aims for a more comprehensive training experience to meet evolving demands, with potential for further attachments to uniformed units. This extension reflects a significant shift from the previous 3-month structure, aiming to ensure trainees are well-prepared for both personal and professional challenges. The proposal highlights a long-term commitment to nurturing patriotic and disciplined individuals.

In 9th August 2026, Brunei has launched the six-month National Service Programme (PKBN) Pilot Project at the National Service Programme Training Camp in Batu Apoi, Temburong. A total of 28 youths, comprising 15 males and 13 females aged between 20 and 25, are participating in the six-month PKBN Pilot Project.

== Aims ==
Program Khidmat Bakti Negara is a youth development programme (Calak Brunei), aimed to awaken the potential and give consciousness to youth to become members of society who are physically strong, with self-esteem, disciplined, insightful, decorum, a believer, volunteerism and entrepreneurial spirit, love for country and king, and support the concept of Melayu Islam Beraja (MIB), Wawasan Negara 2035, realising a State of Zikir, and implement Sharia Law.

Objectives of PKBN are to develop and enhance the spirit of patriotism, commitment and resilience in youths, to enhance the spirit of solidarity and unity, to develop positive characteristics among younger generation through good values, to instil a spirit of caring and volunteerism, to produce healthy, confident, responsible and virtuous youths, and to produce excellent Bruneian youths in line with the Goals of National Youth Policy.

"The state wants to see coaches serve as role models, encouragement, mentoring, and a catalyst in the development of families, communities and countries which include social welfare, society, entrepreneurial and religious", as described by the Minister of Culture, Youth and Sports; Pehin Orang Kaya Pekerma Laila Diraja Dato Seri Setia Awang Haji Abdullah bin Haji Hazair, during the Council Session Meeting with former trainees and trainers PKBN.

Trainees play a role in maintaining peace and stability in the country and care on community welfare. The implementation of PKBN is intended to function as a national youth development programme, with extensive filling and create a patriotic youth with commitment to the king, race, religion, and country.

== Training ==
The PKBN's three months' training process is to train the trainee in the form of discipline, nationality, spirituality, entrepreneurship, community, and understanding the concept of Malay Islamic Monarchy (MIB), and does not stop once the trainees graduate and leave the training camp PKBN. Upon completion of training, the trainees are urged to continue to practice and to contribute to the family, community, and country full, with the knowledge and skills and experience learned and earned during training.

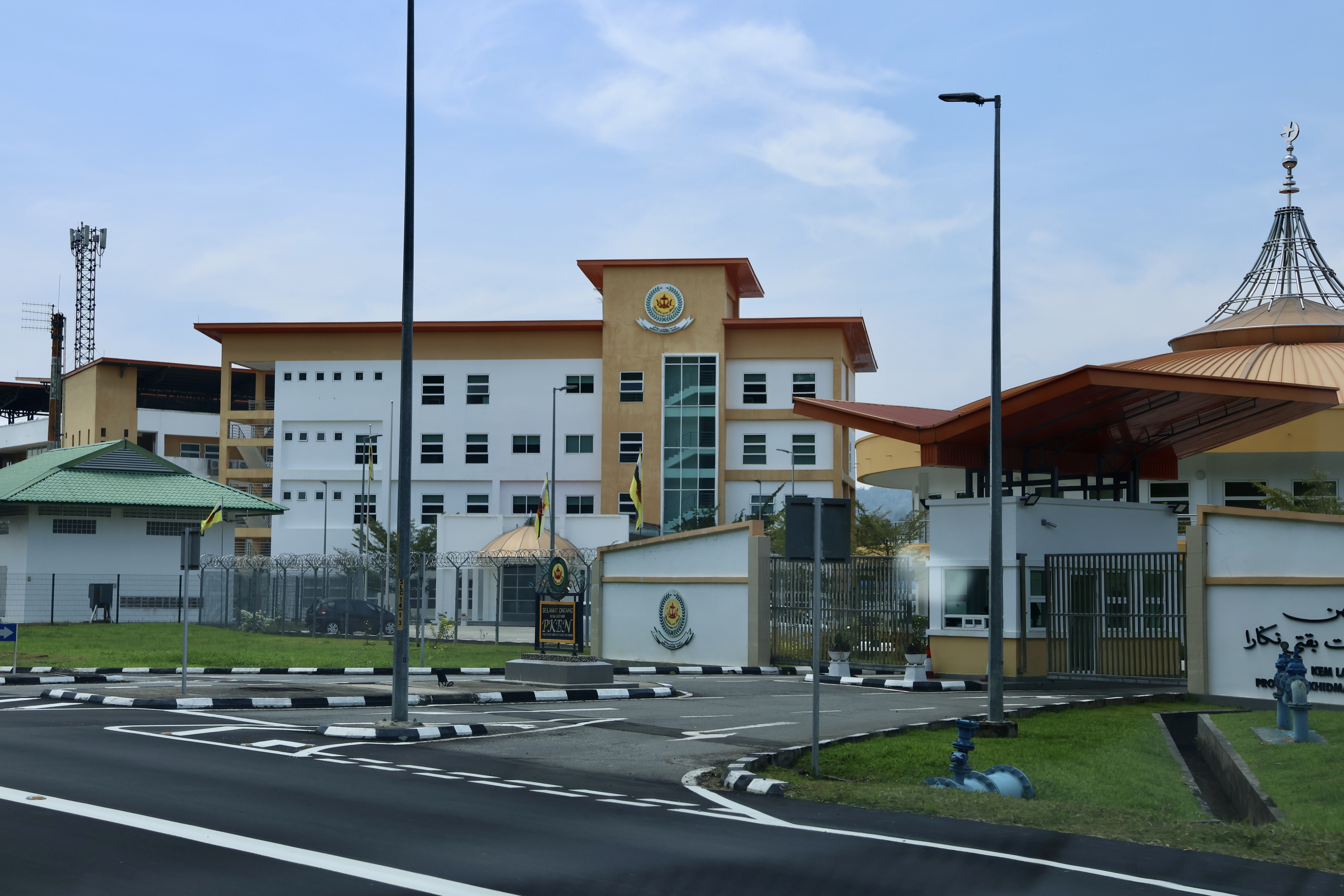
Batu Apoi Training Camp

== New Base Training Camp ==
The original PKBN Base Training Camp is at the Sports Village in Berakas, near to the Indoor Stadium and the Sports School. In 2014, a new B$26 million camp for Programme Khidmat Bakti Negara (PKBN) was built in Kampong Batu Apoi in Temburong District. The construction was completed in June 2014.
