= 2022 in Brunei =

- Decades: 2000s; 2010s; 2020s
- See also: Other events of 2022; Timeline of Bruneian history

Events in the year 2022 in Brunei.

== Incumbents ==
Photo	Post	Name
	Sultan of Brunei	Hassanal Bolkiah

== Events ==
=== June ===
- 7 June – Sultan Hassanal Bolkiah announced a cabinet reshuffle.

=== August ===
- 25 August – Sultan Hassanal Bolkiah concludes a two day state visit to Singapore. Four Memorandums of Understanding are signed during the trip.
- 31 August – Bangladeshi Foreign secretary Masud Bin Momen attends a foreign office consultation meeting in Brunei.
