= 2015 in Brunei =

- Decades: 1990s; 2000s; 2010s; 2020s
- See also: Other events of 2015; Timeline of Bruneian history

The following lists events that happened during 2015 in Brunei Darussalam.

== Establishments ==
- Tabuan Muda (English: Young Wasps) were established as a Bruneian football team.
- The Royal Brunei Air Force (RBAirF) receive the last of twelve Poland-manufactured Sikorsky S-70i Blackhawk helicopters, to replace their ten ageing Bell 212 helicopters.

== Events ==
- January 8 - Brunei officially bans all future public celebrations of Christmas, in accordance with its conservative Islamic law Shariah.
- Late June 2015 Southeast Asian haze began.

== Sports ==
- 2015 SEABA Championship
- Brunei at the 2015 World Aquatics Championships
- Brunei at the 2015 Southeast Asian Games
- Brunei at the 2015 World Championships in Athletics
