= 2021 in Brunei =

- Decades: 2000s; 2010s; 2020s
- See also: Other events of 2021; Timeline of Bruneian history

Events in the year 2021 in Brunei.

== Incumbents ==
- Sultan: Hassanal Bolkiah

== Events ==
Ongoing — COVID-19 pandemic in Brunei

== Deaths ==
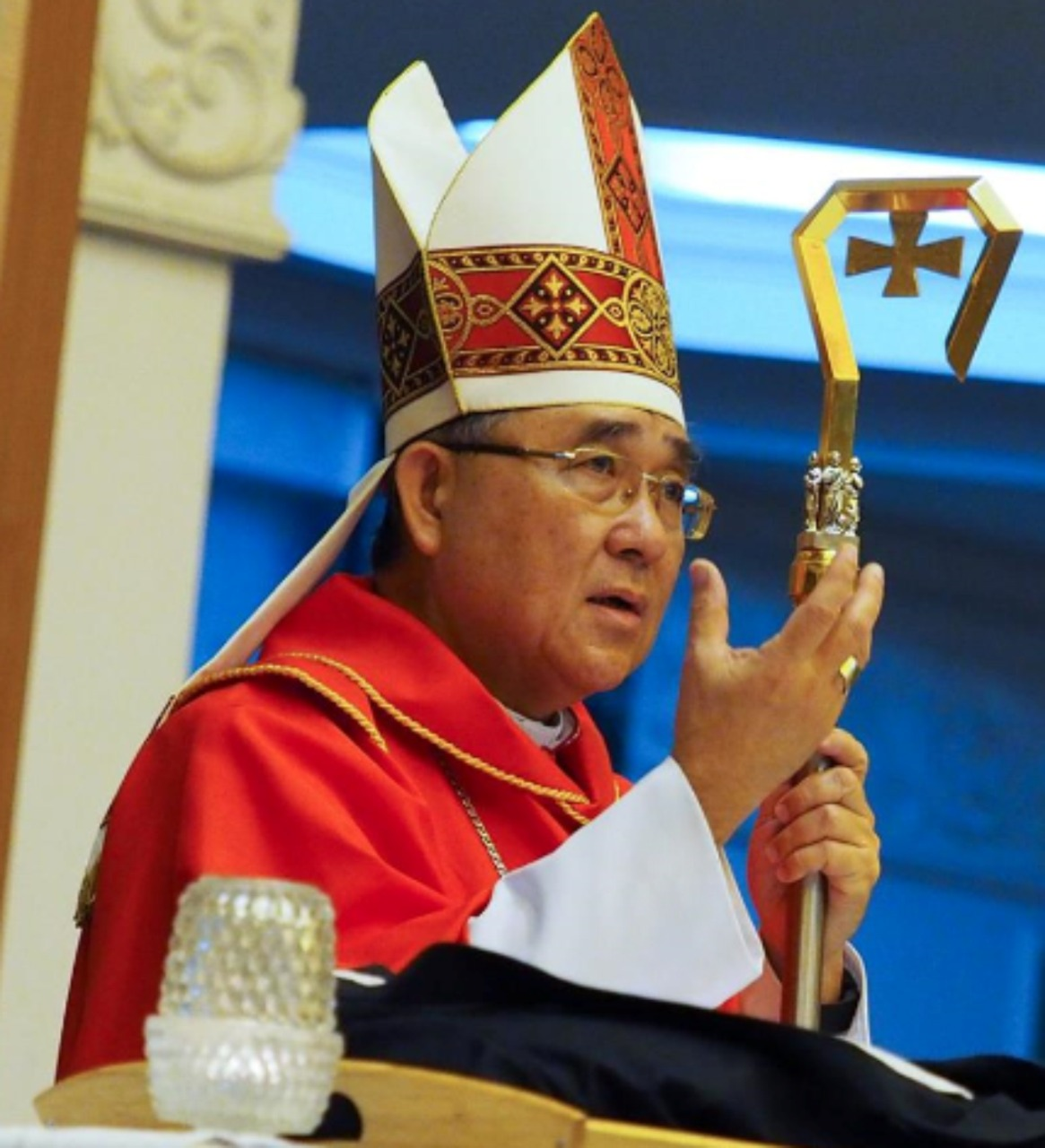
Cornelius Sim

- 29 May – Cornelius Sim, Roman Catholic cardinal and apostolic vicar of Brunei. (b. 1951).
- 15 June – Muslim Burut, recipient of the S.E.A. Write Award and Mastera Literary Award. (b. 1943).
