= 1984 in Brunei =

- Decades: 1960s; 1970s; 1980s; 1990s; 2000s
- See also: Other events of 1984; Timeline of Bruneian history

The following lists events that happened during 1984 in Brunei.

== Events ==
=== January ===
- 1 January - Brunei becomes a fully independent state and joins the Commonwealth of Nations.
- 7 January - Brunei becomes the sixth member of the Association of Southeast Asian Nations.
- 16 January – Brunei becomes the 45th member of the Organisation of Islamic Cooperation.

=== February ===
- 13 February – The Legislative Council of Brunei is dissolved; as a result, a Cabinet is created.
- 23 February – The country's first National Day takes place.

=== September ===
- 21 September – Brunei becomes the 159th member of the United Nations.
