= 2023 in Brunei =

- Decades: 2000s; 2010s; 2020s
- See also: Other events of 2023; Timeline of Bruneian history

The following lists events that happened during 2023 in Brunei.

== Incumbents ==
Photo	Post	Name
	Sultan of Brunei	Hassanal Bolkiah

== Events ==
=== January ===
- 8–17 January – Wedding ceremony of Princess Azemah Ni'matul Bolkiah and Prince Bahar.

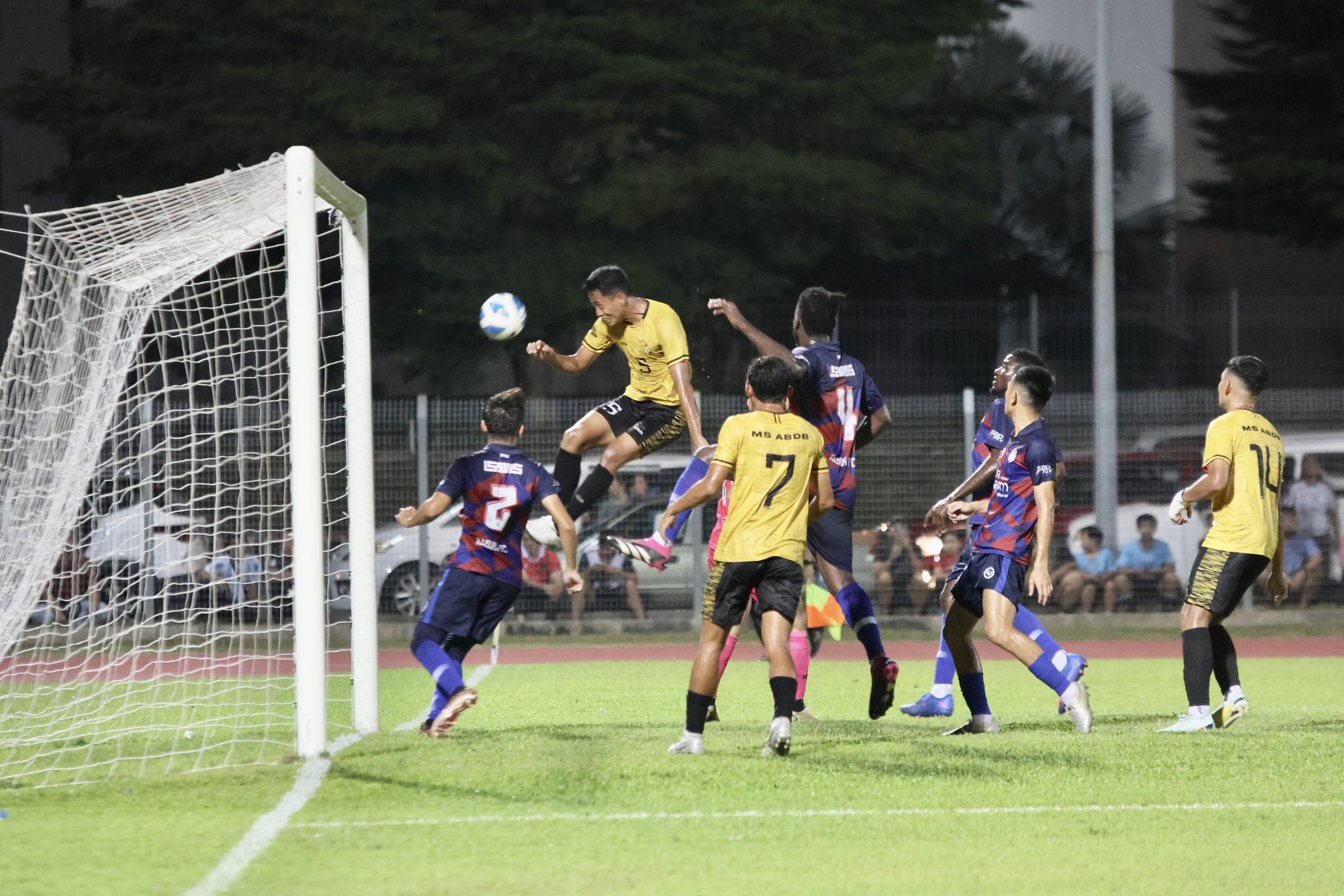
2023 Brunei Super League match being played on 2 June

=== March ===
- 3 March – First match day of the 2023 Brunei Super League was played.
- 21 March – Commissioning ceremony of KDB As-Siddiq at Jetty Bravo, Muara Naval Base.

=== August ===
- 25 August – Mohd Nawawi Taha, private and confidential secretary to the Sultan, had his Privy Council membership and title stripped.

=== October ===
- 24 October – Matsatejo Sokiaw, Deputy Minister of Energy at the Prime Minister's Office, had his tenure terminated.

=== November ===
- 1 November – Sultan Ibrahim Iskandar and Tunku Idris Iskandar visited the Sultan.

=== December ===
- 7 December – Khairul Khalil, former husband to Princess Majeedah of Brunei, had his title stripped.
- 13 December – Commissioning ceremony of KDB Al-Faruq at Jetty Bravo, Muara Naval Base.

== Deaths ==
- 12 May – Umar Apong, second local to be appointed Brunei's police commissioner (b. 1940).
