= Amo =

Amo or AMO may refer to:

== Places ==
- Amo, Indiana, United States, a town in Hendricks County
- Amo Creek, a river in Alaska
- Amu Darya, a river in Central Asia, sometimes referred to as "Amo"
- Amo Township, Cottonwood County, Minnesota
- Kampong Amo, a village in Brunei
- Mao Airport (IATA code: AMO), serving the town of Mao, Chad
- Mukim Amo, a mukim of Brunei

== People ==
- Amo (surname)
- Adam Morrison or Amo (born 1984), American professional basketball player
- Anton Wilhelm Amo, 18th century philosopher

== Arts, entertainment, and media ==
- Amo (TV series), a 2017 Philippine crime drama series
- AMO (band), a Slovak band
- Amo (Bring Me the Horizon album), 2019
- Amo (Miguel Bosé album), or the title track, 2014
- AMO, a character in the animated series Adventure Time episodes "The More You Moe, the Moe You Know"
- "Amo", a 2022 song by Swedish rapper Dani M

== Organizations ==
- AMO, the research arm of the Office for Metropolitan Architecture
- Advanced Medical Optics, a corporation specializing in eye care products
- American Maritime Officers, a labor union
- Archery Trade Association or Archery Manufacturer and Merchant's Organization
- Association of Municipalities of Ontario
- Australian Music Online, an Australian music website
- Avtomobilnoe Moskovskoe Obshchestvo or Zavod Imeni Likhocheva, a Soviet automobile factory
- Air and Marine Operations, an arm of the US Customs & Border Protection agency
- Adams Morgan Organization, a neighborhood group in Washington, DC

== Computing and technology ==
- addons.mozilla.org, also known as Mozilla Add-ons, the Mozilla Foundation's official online repository
- Analysis services Management Object model, the administration and management object model in Microsoft Analysis Services
- Atomic Memory Operation, a special kind of an Atomic Operation in programming

== Healthcare and science ==
- Ablation of osteosynthesis material, a medical procedure, also known in French as ablation du matériel d'ostéosynthèse
- Ammonia monooxygenase, an enzyme
- Atlantic multidecadal oscillation, a climate cycle expressed in the North Atlantic sea surface temperature
- Atomic, molecular, and optical physics

== Other uses ==
- Amo language
- Australian Mathematical Olympiad (AMO), an annual competition
- Karuka is called amo in the Imbongu language
- USAMO
- Wharenui or amo, an architectural feature of a Māori meeting house

== See also ==
- AM0
- Amoo
- Ammo (disambiguation)
