= Selirong Island =

Island in Brunei

Native name: Pulau Selirong Nickname: Mosquito Island
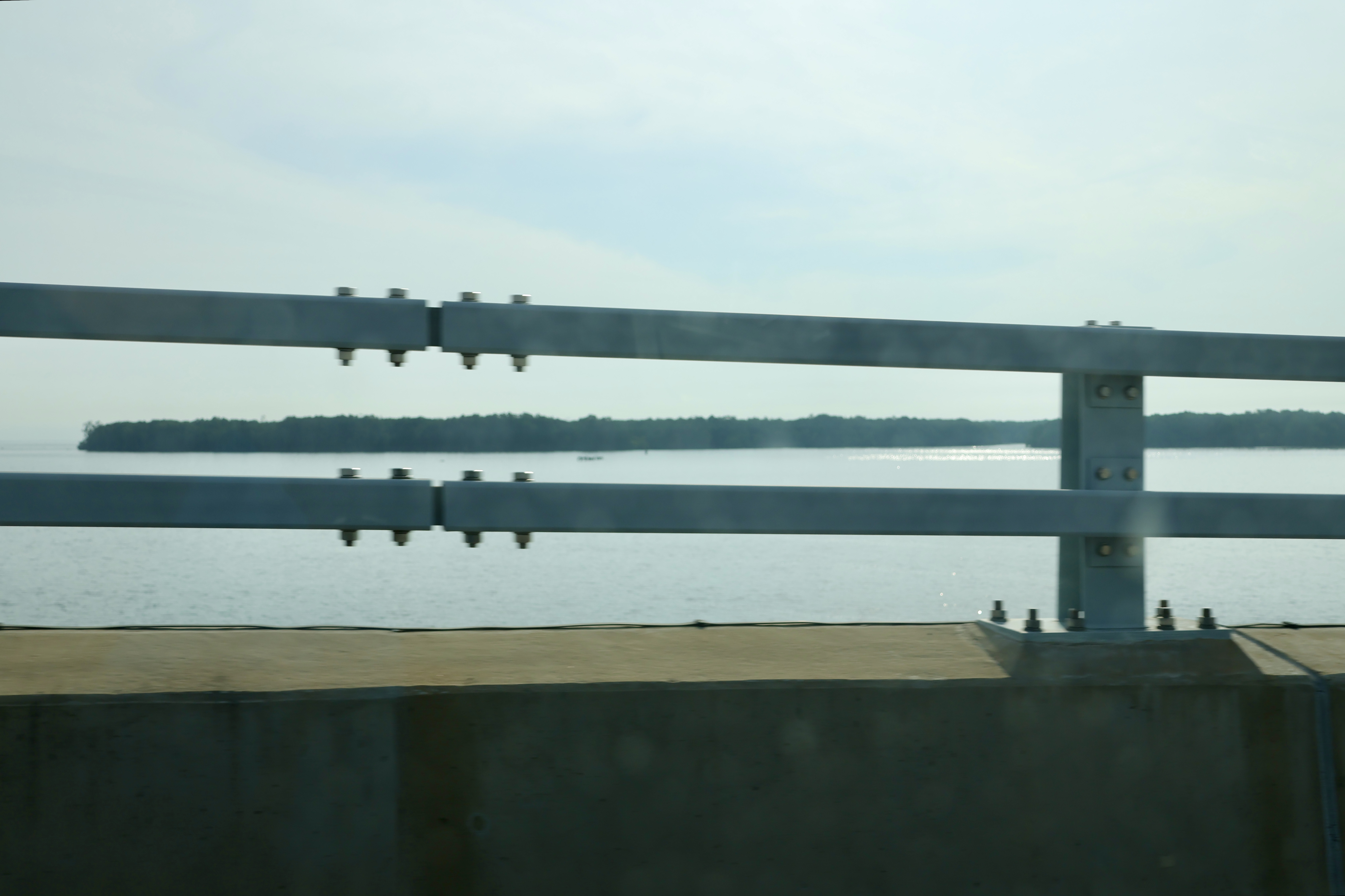
- Selirong Island as seen from Sultan Haji Omar Ali Saifuddien Bridge

- Location in Brunei

Geography
- Location: Brunei Bay
- Coordinates: 4.8818999°N 115.1298164°E
- Archipelago: Malay Archipelago
- Area: 25 km^{2} (9.7 sq mi)
- Highest elevation: 1 m (3 ft)

Administration
- Brunei
- District: Temburong
- Mukim: Labu

Demographics
- Population: 0

Selirong Island (Malay: Pulau Selirong), also known as Mosquito Island, is an island located within the Brunei Bay and Mukim Labu, Temburong District, Brunei. The island also sits at the river delta of the Temburong River.

== Geography ==
Approximately 2,409 hectares (5,950 acres) hectares of the island are covered with mangrove forests, which have been designated as a research and study area for the flora, fauna, and animal species of the country. This area is known as the Pulau Selirong Recreational Forest Park.

== History ==
In 1948, the 2,499 hectares Labu–Selirong Wildlife Sanctuary was established. Initially in 1950, plans for both the Andulau and Selirong Forest Reserve were set to begin within that year but later fell through. Later in 1954, the Labu–Selirong Wildlife Sanctuary was later expanded to an area of 8,984 hectares (22,200 acres). Since 1995, the Forestry Department, along with the Ministry of Industry and Primary Resources, has been working to improve the island, which has now been turned into a recreational park. As part of the 6th National Development Plan, the island was developed into a park by the Forestry Department in 1998.

== Tourism ==
It is home to the Selirong Island Mangrove Park and Selirong Forest Reserve. The island consisted of the largest mangrove swamps and wildlife reserve with an area of 2,566 hectares (6,340 acres). Selirong is one of the ten islands used for ecotourism, research and educational purposes. In order to monitor and investigate the wildlife on the island, notably a 2 kilometres (1.2 mi) walkway and an observation tower were built.

Animals such as the proboscis monkeys, macaques, kingfishers and eagles made up the fauna. Meanwhile, plants such as the nipah palms, stilt roots, bakau trees can be found in the Pulau Selirong Forest Recreation Park.

== Transportation ==
The island can only be accessed by speedboats from Bandar Seri Begawan. The estimated time to reach the island from Muara is 45 minutes as it is required to pass through the Brunei River and across the Brunei Bay.

== See also ==
- Protected areas of Brunei
