= Tudal Hill =

Hill in Temburong District, Brunei

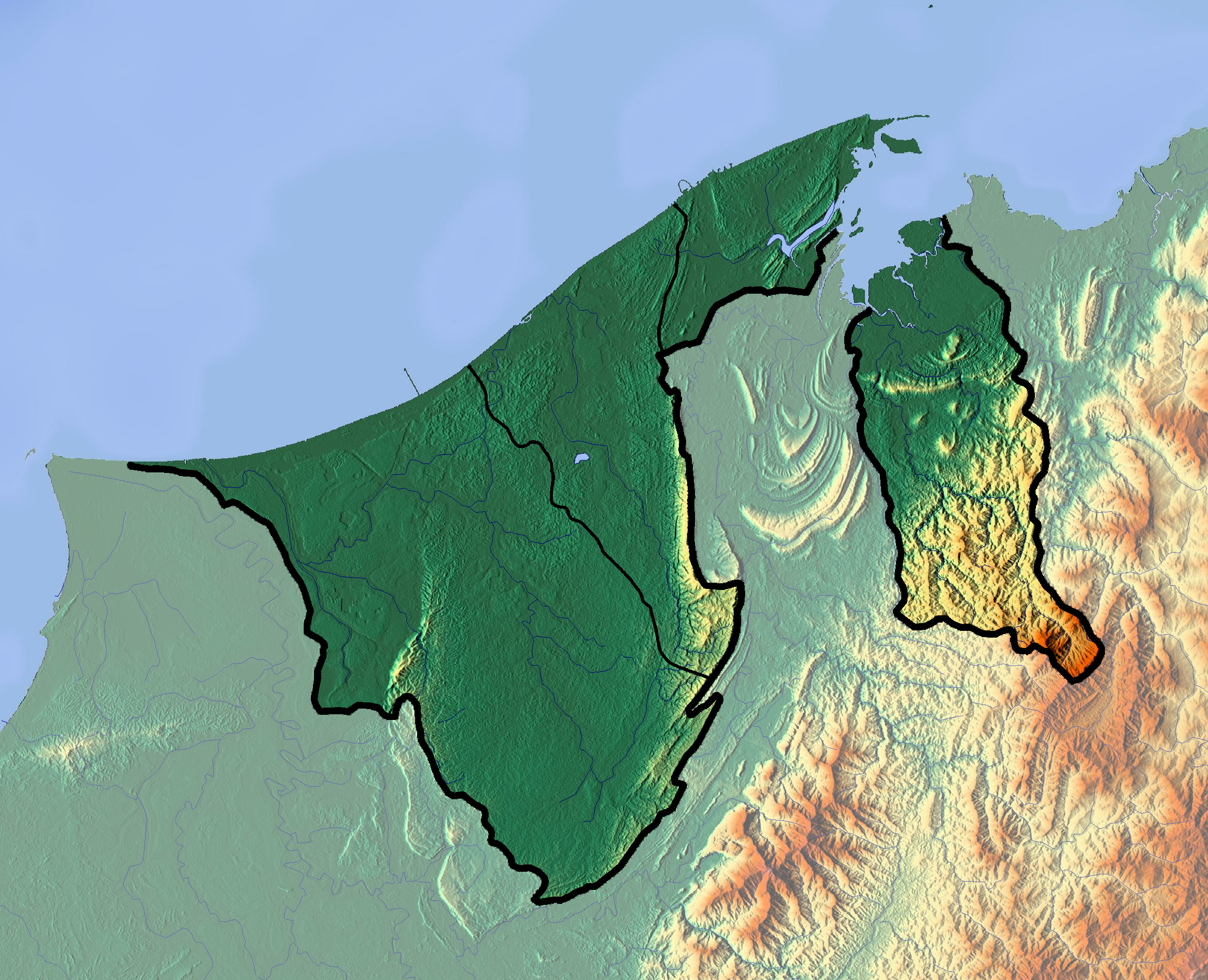
- Location within Brunei

Highest point
- Elevation: 1,181 m (3,875 ft)
- Coordinates: 4°23′38″N 115°18′45″E

Naming
- Native name: Bukit Tudal (Malay)

Geography
- Countries: Brunei and Malaysia
- District: Sarawak and Temburong
- Region: Amo and Limbang

Tudal Hill (Malay: Bukit Tudal), is one of the major hills shared between Mukim Amo, Temburong District of Brunei and Limbang Division, Sarawak of Malaysia.

== Description ==
Retak Hill sits at the north of Pagon Hill with a height of 1,181 metres (3,875 ft), and remained one of the major hills in Brunei. Lasianthus bruneensis were found on the hill, alongside Meligan sandstone found on headwaters of the Temburong River between Tudal Hill and Lesong Hill. Mix of hill forests also grow on the hills of Tudal and Pagon.
