= Kampong Parit =

The name Kampong Parit may refer to:

- Batu Satu also known as Kampong Parit, village in Mukim Kianggeh, Brunei-Muara District, Brunei
- Kampong Parit, Pengkalan Batu, Brunei-Muara District, Brunei
- Kampong Parit, Temburong, village in Mukim Amo, Temburong District, Brunei
