= Amoo =

Amoo is a surname. Notable people with this name include:

- Ray Amoo
- Ryan Amoo
- Seth Amoo
- Chris Amoo
- David Amoo
- Akosua Addai Amoo
- Elijah Amoo Addo
- George Isaac Amoo
- Mohsen Amoo-Aghaei
- Eddie Amoo
- Amoo norooz
- Akinkunmi Amoo

== See also ==
- Amo (disambiguation)
- Ammo (disambiguation)
