= Retak Hill =

Hill in Temburong District, Brunei

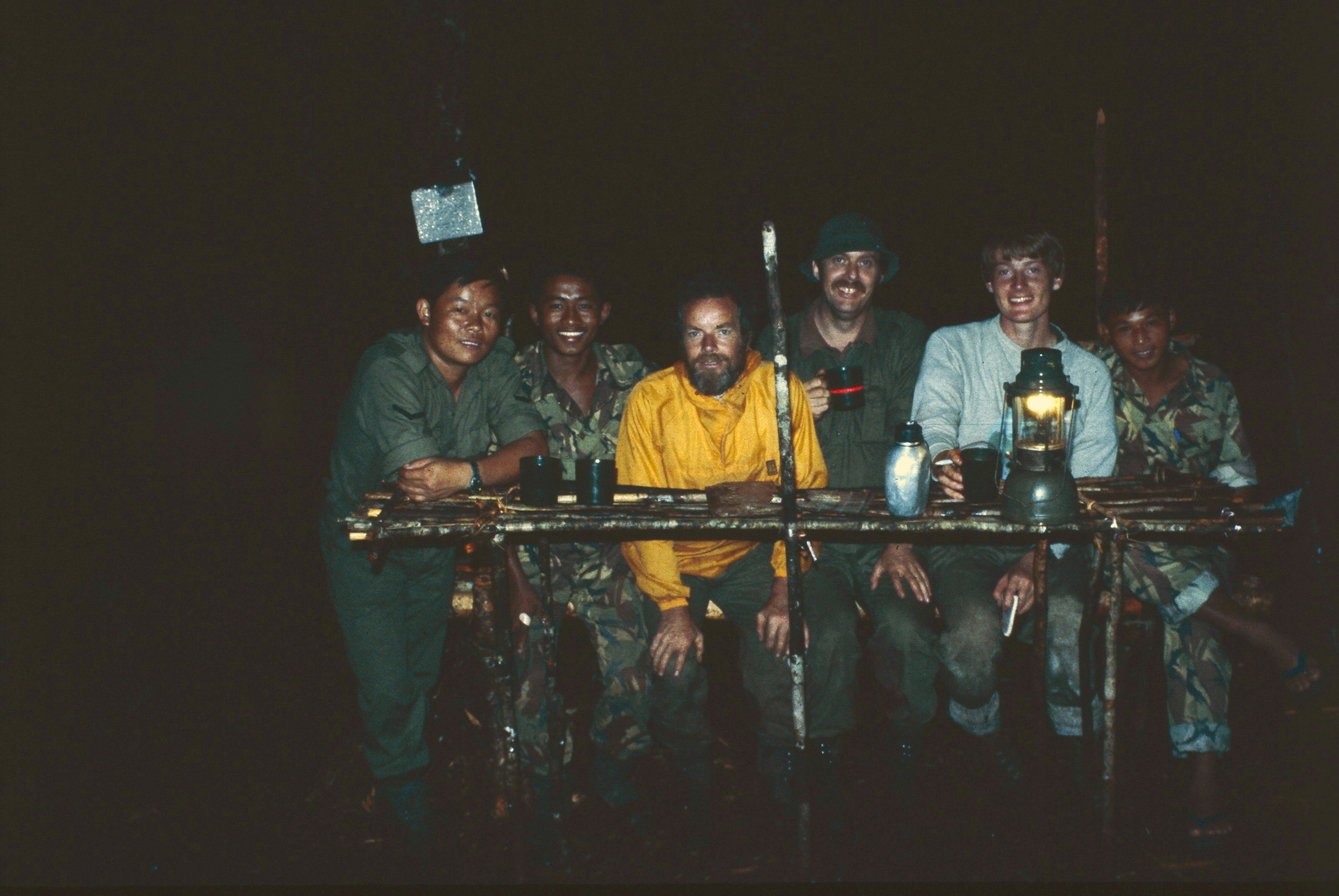
- Retak Hill, 1981 expedition team

Highest point
- Elevation: 1,618 m (5,308 ft)
- Coordinates: 4°20′18″N 115°17′47″E

Naming
- Native name: Bukit Retak (Malay)

Geography
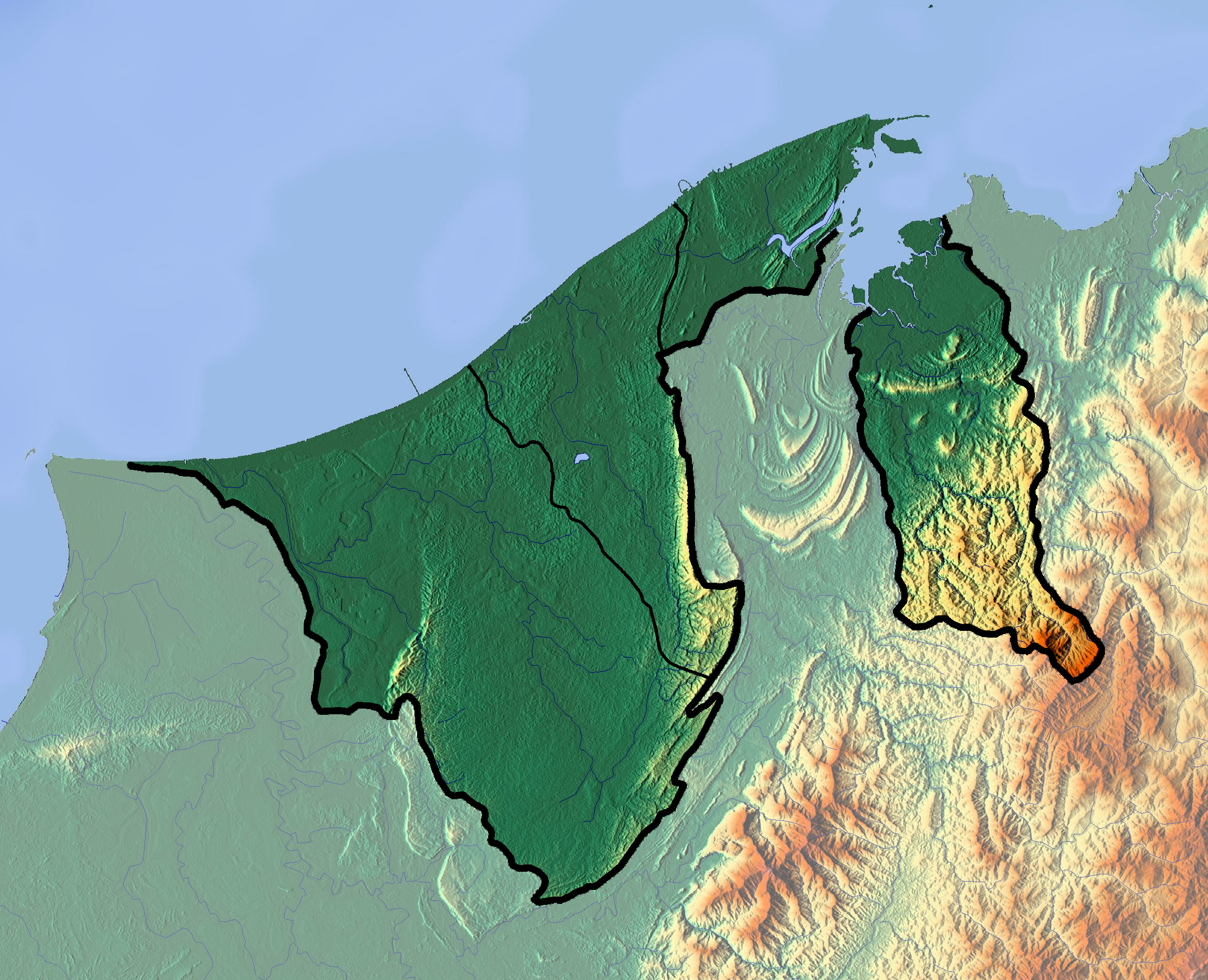
- Location within Brunei Location within Malaysia
- Countries: Brunei and Malaysia
- District: Sarawak and Temburong
- Region: Amo and Limbang

Retak Hill (Malay: Bukit Retak), is one of the major hills shared between Mukim Amo, Temburong District of Brunei and Limbang Division, Sarawak of Malaysia.

== Description ==
Retak Hill sits at the north of Pagon Hill with a height of 1,618 metres (5,308 ft), and remained one of the major hills in Brunei. Montane forest covers the hill, followed by the presence of quartzite rocks and metamorphosed siltstones.

== History ==
A crucial expedition team was sent to the forests around Tembikai and Retak Hill in 1978. In the early 1980s, it was known that Netelia harmani wasps were found on the hill. Moreover, Papilio acheron butterflies were also found on the mountain.
