= Sultan Haji Omar Ali Saifuddien Bridge =

Automotive bridge in SE Asia which connects the Brunei mainland to its exclave

Sultan Haji Omar 'Ali Saifuddien Bridge Jambatan Sultan Haji Omar 'Ali Saifuddien جمبتن سلطان حاج عمر علي سيف الدين
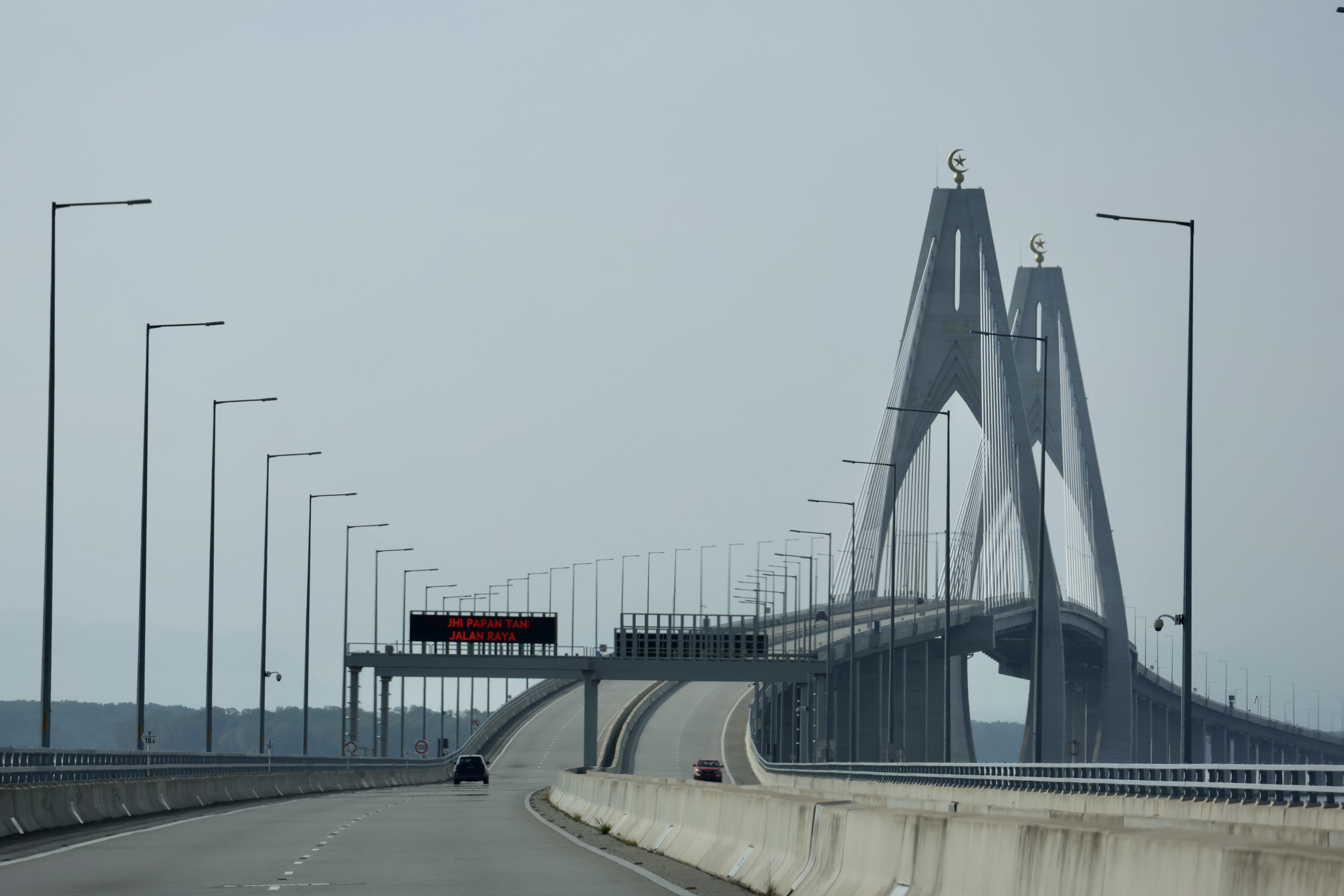
- Coordinates: 4.8857°N 115.0818°E
- Carries: Motor vehicles
- Crosses: Brunei Bay
- Locale: Brunei
- Named for: Sultan Omar Ali Saifuddien III
- Maintained by: Public Works Department

Characteristics
- Design: Box girder and cable-stayed bridge
- Total length: 30 km (19 mi)

History
- Designer: Arup Group
- Constructed by: Daelim (construction division); China State Construction Engineering
- Construction start: mid-2014
- Construction end: 2019
- Construction cost: B$1.6 billion
- Opened: 17 March 2020; 6 years ago

Location
- Interactive map of Sultan Haji Omar 'Ali Saifuddien Bridge

Sultan Haji Omar 'Ali Saifuddien Bridge (Malay: Jambatan Sultan Haji Omar 'Ali Saifuddien, Jawi: جمبتن سلطان حاج عمر علي سيف الدين), also known as Temburong Bridge (Malay: Jambatan Temburong, Jawi: جمبتن تمبوروڠ), is a dual-carriageway bridge in Brunei that spans across Brunei Bay, connecting the Bruneian mainland with its semi-exclave of Temburong District. It is the longest bridge in Southeast Asia, at 30 kilometres (19 mi) long.

== Design and features ==
The bridge features several unique architectural elements that reflect Brunei's cultural and religious identity. At the highest points, star and crescent symbols are prominently displayed, signifying Brunei as a Muslim state, similar to their placement atop mosque domes. Road signs featuring the three kalimahs (Islamic declarations) are strategically placed along the bridge to remind drivers to remember Allah while travelling. The bridge's triangular, gem-like structure, resembling two hands holding firmly, symbolises the nation's strength and resilience. Additionally, a dome-like structure represents the unity of Brunei's four districts, emphasising national cohesion and harmony.

== Construction ==
The 2006–2025 National Land Use Master Plan calls for increased connection between Brunei–Muara and Temburong Districts, citing the geographical isolation of the Temburong District as a developmental constraint. In 2012, Public Works Department consultants conducted a feasibility study for a bridge link, which verified that the project was technically possible, fiscally viable, and environmentally manageable. After that, a thorough environmental impact assessment was put out to bid in September 2012. By June 2013, pre-qualification offers for construction were issued, encompassing important infrastructure such tunnels beneath the Subok ridgeline and sea viaducts. The bridge, which was anticipated to be finished by 2018, would complete a portion of the Pan Borneo Highway and improve Temburong's growth, strengthening Brunei and Sabah's economic relations.

The construction of the bridge was divided into six 'packages' or contracts. The first was CC1 or the Mentiri Tunnels which involved the construction of a series of tunnels through the Mentiri Ridges which connects Jalan Utama Mentiri, a controlled-access dual carriageway with Jalan Kota Batu. Other construction packages included CC2, CC3 and CC4 comprising marine viaducts, navigation bridges and Temburong viaduct respectively. CC2 and CC3 were awarded to Daelim, a South Korean company, which was responsible for constructing a system of viaducts and two cable-stayed bridges that crosses the Brunei Bay. Meanwhile, China State Construction Engineering was awarded the CC4 contract and was responsible for constructing the land viaduct which traverses the mangrove swamp of Labu Forest Reserve. CC5A and CC5B are the traffic control and survelliance system, and power supply system respectively. The project is reported to cost 1.6 billion Brunei dollars (US$1.2 billion as of March 2018).

Construction on the bridge started in 2014 and was expected to be completed and opened by the end of 2019, but it ultimately opened during March 2020. Due to the COVID-19 pandemic, the bridge was opened ahead of schedule on 17 March 2020, a day after Brunei barred most non-resident foreigners from entering the country, and most citizens and residents from leaving, which would have otherwise disconnected Temburong from the rest of the country.

On 14 July 2020, on the occasion of Sultan Haji Hassanal Bolkiah's 74th birthday, the bridge was named the Sultan Haji Omar 'Ali Saifuddien Bridge in honour of the Sultan's late father, Sultan Haji Omar 'Ali Saifuddien Saadul Khairi Waddien, who is widely regarded as the architect of modern Brunei.

== Route ==
The road system is a controlled-access dual carriageway which begins at a grade-separated interchange with Jalan Utama Mentiri between the Sungai Akar roundabout and the Salambigar intersection. The road then goes through two parallel tunnels and ends at another grade-separated interchange with Jalan Kota Batu. This section is 3.6 kilometres (2.2 miles) long. The bridge then begins, with a 14.5-kilometre (9.0-mile) viaduct across the Brunei Bay, passing across the tip of Pulau Berambang, then in between Pulau Pepatan and Pulau Baru-Baru, up to Tanjung Kulat in Temburong. Finally, another 11.8-kilometre (7.3-mile) viaduct begins from Tanjung Kulat and ends at Jalan Labu, traversing through Labu Forest Reserve, and includes a bridge which crosses the Labu River, before intersecting with Jalan Labu at a roundabout.

It connects Mengkubau and Sungai Besar in Brunei-Muara District with Labu Estate in Temburong District. This is the only road bridge in the country that directly links the mainland with the Temburong exclave, which are physically separated by the Sarawakian district of Limbang in Malaysia and Brunei Bay in the South China Sea. The bridge allows commuters to travel between the two territories without having to go through Malaysia, bypassing four immigration checkpoints along the mainland route and shortening travel times between Temburong and the capital Bandar Seri Begawan. Previously, the only direct connection between the capital and Bangar, the district town, was via water taxi services, which took about 45 minutes.

== Junction list ==
| District | Mukim | Location | km | mi | Destinations | Notes |
|---|---|---|---|---|---|---|
| Brunei-Muara | Kota Batu | Mengkubau | | | Jalan Penghubung Mentiri – Sungai Akar, Subok, Pulaie, Salambigar, Lambak | Under construction |
| Brunei-Muara | Kota Batu | Mengkubau | | | Mentiri Tunnel 1 (under construction) | |
| Brunei-Muara | Kota Batu | Mengkubau | | | Mentiri Tunnel 2 (under construction) | |
| Brunei-Muara | Kota Batu | Sungai Besar | | | Jalan Kota Batu – Sungai Besar, Mentiri, Tanah Jambu, Muara, Kota Batu, Bandar Seri Begawan | Northwest-bound exit and southeast-bound entrance only |
| Brunei-Muara | Kota Batu | Brunei River estuary | | | Temburong Bridge over the Brunei River | |
| Brunei-Muara | Kota Batu | Brunei River estuary | | | Allocation for future connection to Pulau Berambang | |
| Brunei-Muara | Kota Batu | Brunei Bay | | | Temburong Bridge over the Brunei Bay | |
| Brunei-Muara | Kota Batu | Brunei Bay | | | Allocation for future connections to Pulau Pepatan and Pulau Baru-Baru | |
| Limbang, Limbang, Sarawak, Malaysia | | | | | Temburong Bridge over the Brunei Bay | |
| Temburong | Labu | Labu Forest Reserve | | | Sungai Pasu Gadong bridge | |
| Temburong | Labu | Labu Estate | | | Labu River bridge | |
| Temburong | Labu | Labu Estate | | | Jalan Labu: Labu, Bangar, Puni, Ujong Jalan, Batu Apoi, Amo | |
1.000 mi = 1.609 km; 1.000 km = 0.621 mi: Proposed; Incomplete access; Unopened
