= List of rivers of Brunei =

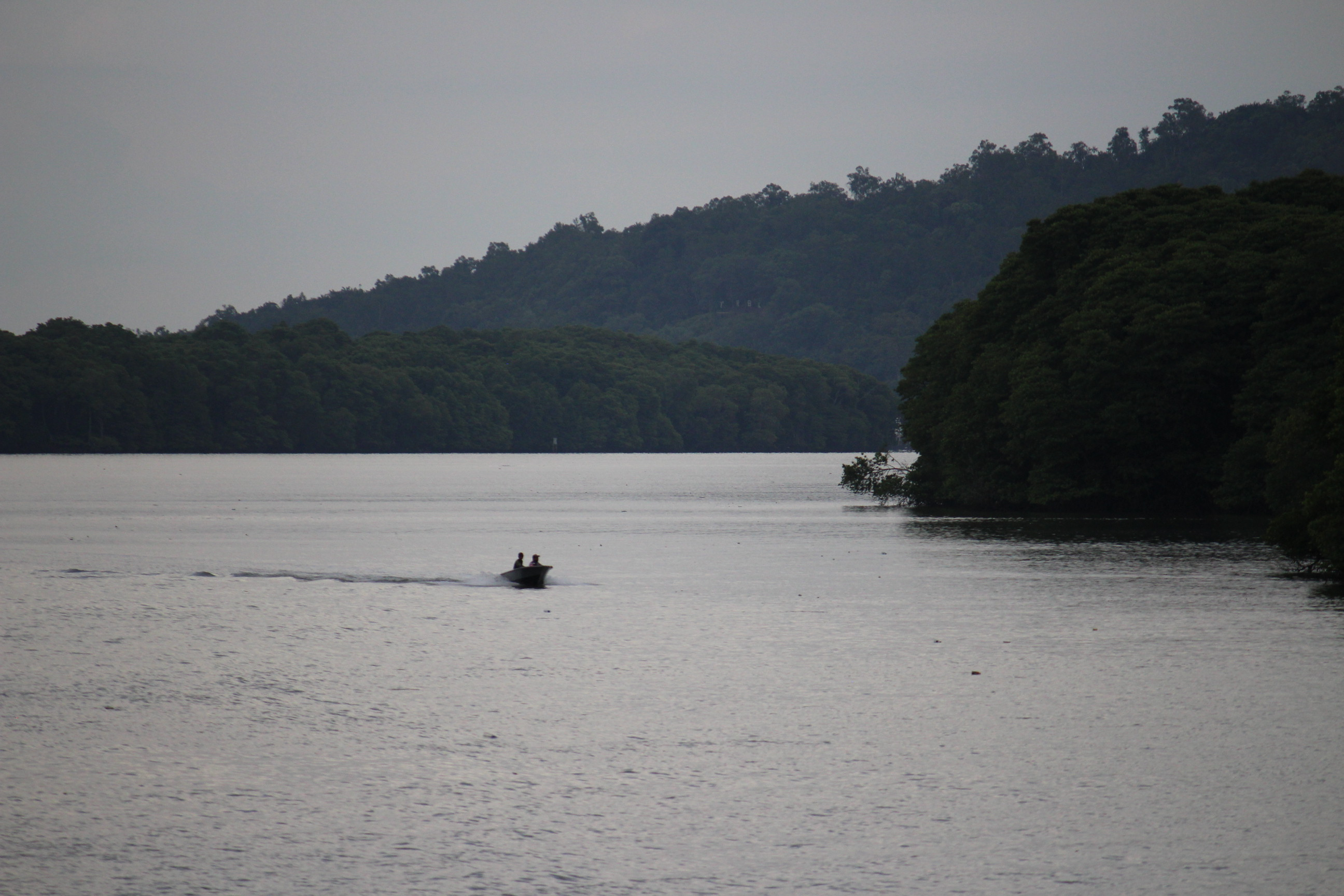
Brunei River

This is a list of rivers in Brunei.

== Longest river by district ==
Longest rivers in each district
State/territory	River name	Length		Source
State/territory	River name	km	miles	Source
Belait	Belait River	209	129.86	
Tutong	Tutong River	137	85.13	
Temburong	Temburong River	98	60.89	
Brunei-Muara	Brunei River	41	25.48	

== Rivers by district ==
=== Belait ===
- Belait
- Geriting
- Gana
- Lumut
- Kang
- Liang Kecil
- Kayu Ara
- Anduki
- Bera
- Seria
- Mendaram
- Damit
- Bedas
- Premat
- Baran

=== Tutong ===
- Tutong
- Kelakas
- Danau
- Birau
- Sembatang
- Kalamang
- Kelugus
- Pentyatang
- Pepakan
- Tempikku
- Telamba

=== Temburong ===
- Pandaruan
- Temburong
- Belayang
- Kibi
- Labu
- Luagan
- Lamaling Besar
- Lakiun
- Kutop

=== Brunei-Muara ===
- Brunei
- Berakas
- Limbang
- Butir
- Menunggul
- Kedayan
- Damuan
- Teritip
- Mentiri
- Salar
- Pagalayan
- Mangsalut
- Kianggeh
