= Kampong Selangan =

Village in Brunei

- Village
- Location in Brunei
- Coordinates: 4°38′51″N 115°05′51″E
- Country: Brunei
- District: Temburong
- Mukim: Amo

Government
  - Village head: Dulamit Burot

Population (2021)
  - Total: 241
- Time zone: UTC+8 (BNT)
- Postcode: PD2751

Kampong Selangan is a village in Temburong District, Brunei, about 9.5 kilometres (5.9 mi) from the district town Bangar. The population was 241 in 2021. It is one of the villages within Mukim Amo. The postcode is PD2751.

== Facilities ==
Selangan Primary School is the village's government primary school. It also shares grounds with Selangan Religious School, the village's government school for the country's Islamic religious primary education.

The village mosque is Kampong Selangan Mosque; it was inaugurated on 14 December 1979 and can accommodate 200 worshippers.
