= Kampong Parit, Temburong =

Kampong Parit
- Village
- Location in Brunei
- Coordinates: 4°38′08″N 115°06′13″E
- Country: Brunei
- District: Temburong
- Mukim: Amo

Government
  - Village head: Dulamit Burot
- Postcode: PD2351

Kampong Parit is a village in Amo, a mukim (subdistrict) in Temburong District, Brunei. The postcode for Kampong Parit is PD2351.

== Name ==
Kampong Parit comes from the Malay name which translates as 'Parit Village'.
