= Kampong Sibut =

Village in Brunei

Sibut
- Village
- Kampong Sibut
- Location in Brunei
- Coordinates: 4°36′58″N 115°06′24″E
- Country: Brunei
- District: Temburong
- Mukim: Amo

Government
  - Village head: Suhaili Badas

Population (2021)
  - Total: 192
- Time zone: UTC+8 (BNT)
- Postcode: PD2151

Kampong Sibut (Malay: Kampung Sibut) or simply known as Sibut, is a village in Temburong District, Brunei, about 13 kilometres (8.1 mi) from the district town Bangar. The population was 192 in 2021. It is one of the villages within Mukim Amo. The postcode is PD2151.

== Economy ==
In order to reveal their homestay to tourists, Majlis Perundingan Kampung (MPK) Sibut has partnered with travel agents who take tourists to Ulu Belalong National Park where staying at Lubuk Batu Mas Homestay, Kampung Sibut is also included in the travel package offered by the agents concerned. The reception of the tourists is encouraging where visits are increasing from time to time including tourists from Europe, Kenya, Spain, Italy, Hungary and Africa. The operation of a country home certainly brings many benefits such an enterprise can reveal the culture of the Iban tribe to foreign countries both in terms of food, clothing and so on. This is because visitors staying at the Lubuk Batu Mas Homestay, Kampung Sibut can participate in a number of activities following the packages that have been prepared such as watching Iban cultural performances, traditional Iban food preparation activities, watching handicraft exhibitions and other necessary activities.

== Infrastructure ==
=== Places of interest ===
- The village mosque is Balai Ibadat Kampong Sibut ("Kampong Sibut Worship Hall"). The construction began in 1993 and completed in the following year. It can accommodate 160 worshippers.
- Homestay Lubuk Batu Mas, Kampung Sibut, a longhouse and homestay that won the ASEAN Homestay Award in January 2019.
