= Brunei Bay =

Bay on the north-west coast of Borneo

Brunei Bay Teluk Brunei
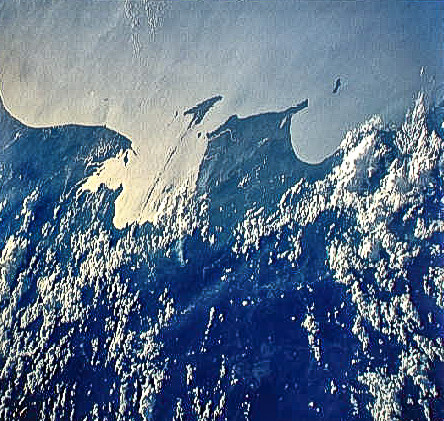
- Brunei Bay from space

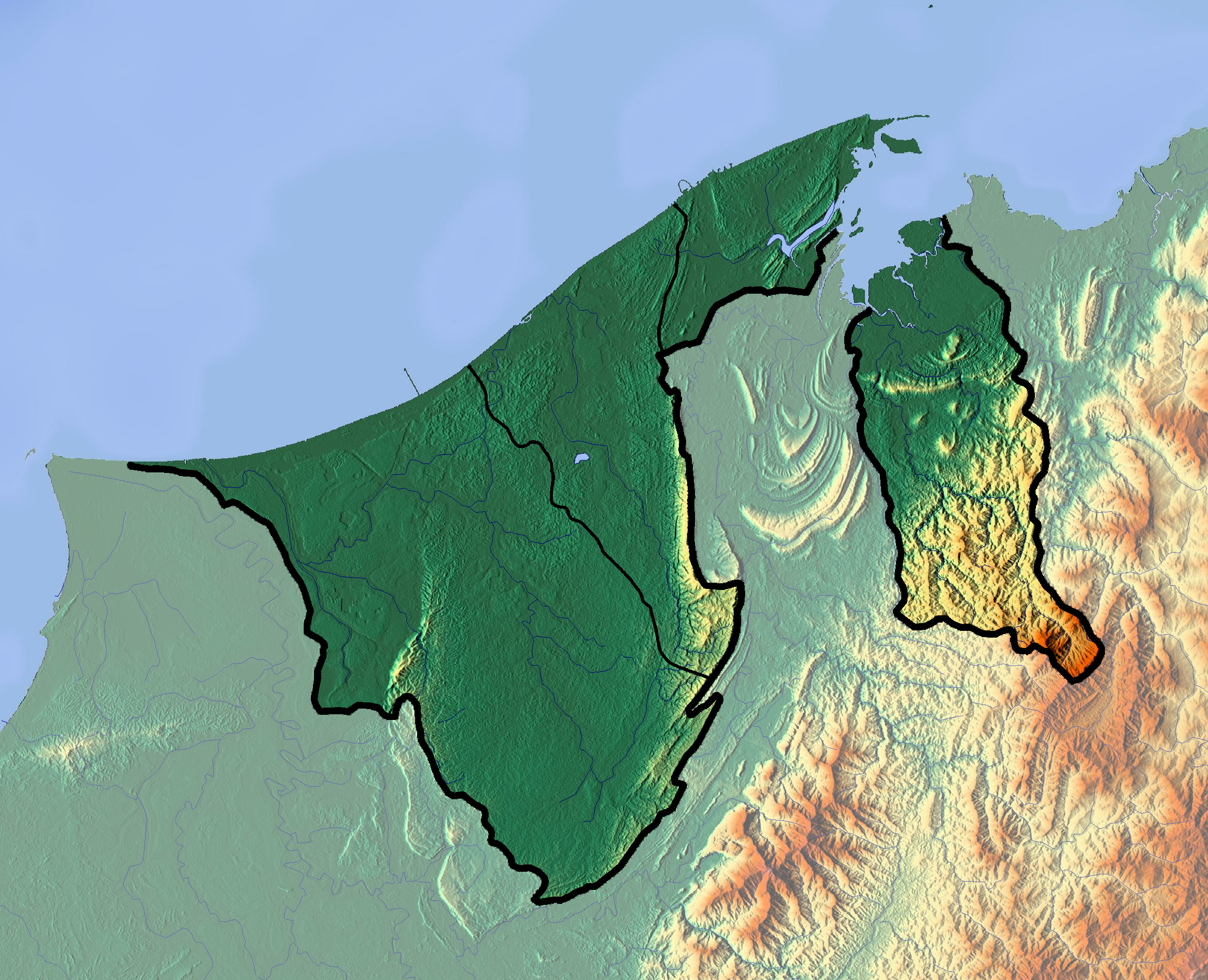
- Location within Brunei
- Location: Southeast Asia
- Coordinates: 5°00′43.44″N 115°17′26.66″E
- Type: Bay
- Primary inflows: South China Sea
- Basin countries: Brunei, Malaysia

Brunei Bay (Malay: Teluk Brunei) is a bay on the northwestern coast of the island of Borneo in Brunei and Malaysia. It is a Key Biodiversity Area and an Important Bird Area, the latter because it supports significant populations of various bird species.

== Description ==
Brunei Bay is part of both Brunei and Malaysia. It borders the Malaysian states of Sarawak and Sabah and the Brunei-Muara and Temburong districts of Brunei on the island of Borneo. Sarawak separates the two districts.

Completed in 2018, the Sultan Haji Omar Ali Saifuddien Bridge connects the districts. It is the longest bridge in Southeast Asia at 30 kilometres (19 mi); 14 kilometres (8.7 mi) is actually over the bay.

The rivers that flow into the bay include the Brunei River (in the western part of Brunei), Temburong River (in Temburong District) and the Limbang River (in Sarawak).

== Environment ==
Brunei Bay has tidal mudflats and sandflats, seagrass beds, coral reefs, mangroves, and sandstone islets.

An area of 1,441.25 square kilometres (556.47 sq mi) was designated a Key Biodiversity Area.

In 2004, BirdLife International the bay an Important Bird Area because it supports significant populations of various bird species, including Bonaparte's nightjars, lesser adjutants, Storm's storks, Chinese egrets, greater sandplovers, spotted greenshanks and roseate terns.

Animal species include the proboscis monkey and giant mudskipper.

Mangroves flourish on the shore of the bay. Nypah fruticans grow on the edges of the mangrove forests.

== Threats ==
Threats include inshore trawling, waterbird hunting, and habitat fragmentation through mangrove clearance.

Cargo ships and oil tankers anchor in the bay.
