= Amo Creek =

Stream in North Slope Borough, Alaska, U.S.

Coordinates: 68°57′N 160°12′W

Amo Creek is a stream in North Slope Borough, Alaska, in the United States. It is a tributary of the Colville River

The name Amo is derived from the Eskimo word meaning "wolf".

== See also ==
- List of rivers of Alaska
