= Ray Amoo =

Nigerian boxer

Personal information
- Nationality: Nigerian
- Weight: fly/super fly/bantamweight

Boxing career

Boxing record
- Total fights: 8
- Wins: 3 (KO 0)
- Losses: 4 (KO 3)
- Draws: 0
- No contests: 1

Ray Amoo is a Nigerian professional fly/super fly/bantamweight boxer of the 1970s and '80s who won the Commonwealth flyweight title, and was a challenger for the West African Boxing Union flyweight title against Nana Yaw Konadu.
