= Temburong River =

River in Brunei

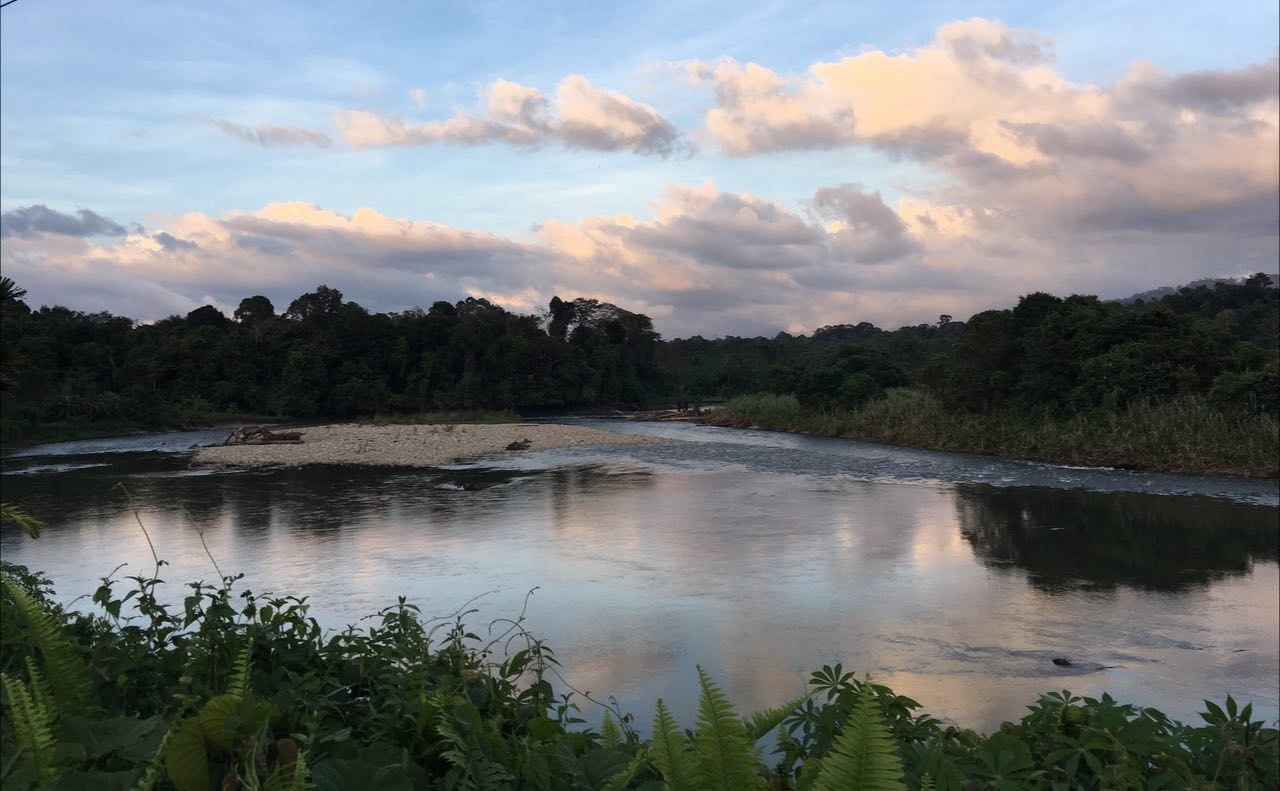
- View of Temburong River from Jalan Batang Duri
- Native name: Sungai Temburong

Location
- Country: Brunei
- District: Temburong

Physical characteristics
- Source
  - location: Belait River, Belait, Brunei
  - coordinates: 4°09′59″N 114°43′17″E
- Mouth
  - location: Temburong, Brunei
  - coordinates: 4.8171551°N 115.0555029°E
- Length: 98 km (61 mi)
- Basin size: 430 km^{2} (170 sq mi)

Basin features
- Tributaries
  - left: Balalong
  - right: Lamaling Besar, Labu

The Temburong River (Malay: Sungai Temburong) is a river in Temburong District, an exclave of Brunei, which flows generally north into Brunei Bay.

Its headwaters lie between Tudal Hill and Lesong Hill in Ulu Temburong National Park. The upper basins of the Temburong River and the Belalong River, its main upper tributary, lie in the southeastern and southwestern parts, respectively, of the park. The Belalong merges into the Temburon near the middle of the park's western border. The Temburong then exits the park, continues north to the town of Bangar and drains into the estuary of Brunei Bay.

It drains a catchment area of around 840 square kilometres (320 sq mi).

Saltwater extends about 4 kilometres (2.5 mi) inland from Bangar; the Iban people have historically settled and fished in the freshwater sections.

According to a 1972 report, the possibility of generating hydroelectric power on the river was investigated. The report also described abundant deposits of quartzitic sandstone, useful as building aggregate, at the river's headwaters, though its remote location poses a problem.

Some of Brunei's historical sites are located along the river banks, including:

- Ulu Temburong National Park, the first national park of Brunei, which was protected in 1991.
- Utama Mohammad Salleh Mosque, a 1968 mosque in Bangar Town.
- Labu Estate Rubber Industrial Site, a plantation and agriculture site from the 1900s.

The Bangar Bridge was built around 1969. It is located across the Temburong River, measuring 300 feet (91 m) in length and 40 feet (12 m) in width. Previously, the residents in this area used boats to cross to other regions. Once the bridge was completed, it became the main connection between the old Bangar Town, new Bangar Town, Labu Estate, and the surrounding areas. The construction of the bridge was part of the National Development Plan.
