= Bukit Pagon =

Hill in Temburong District, Brunei

Pagon Hill
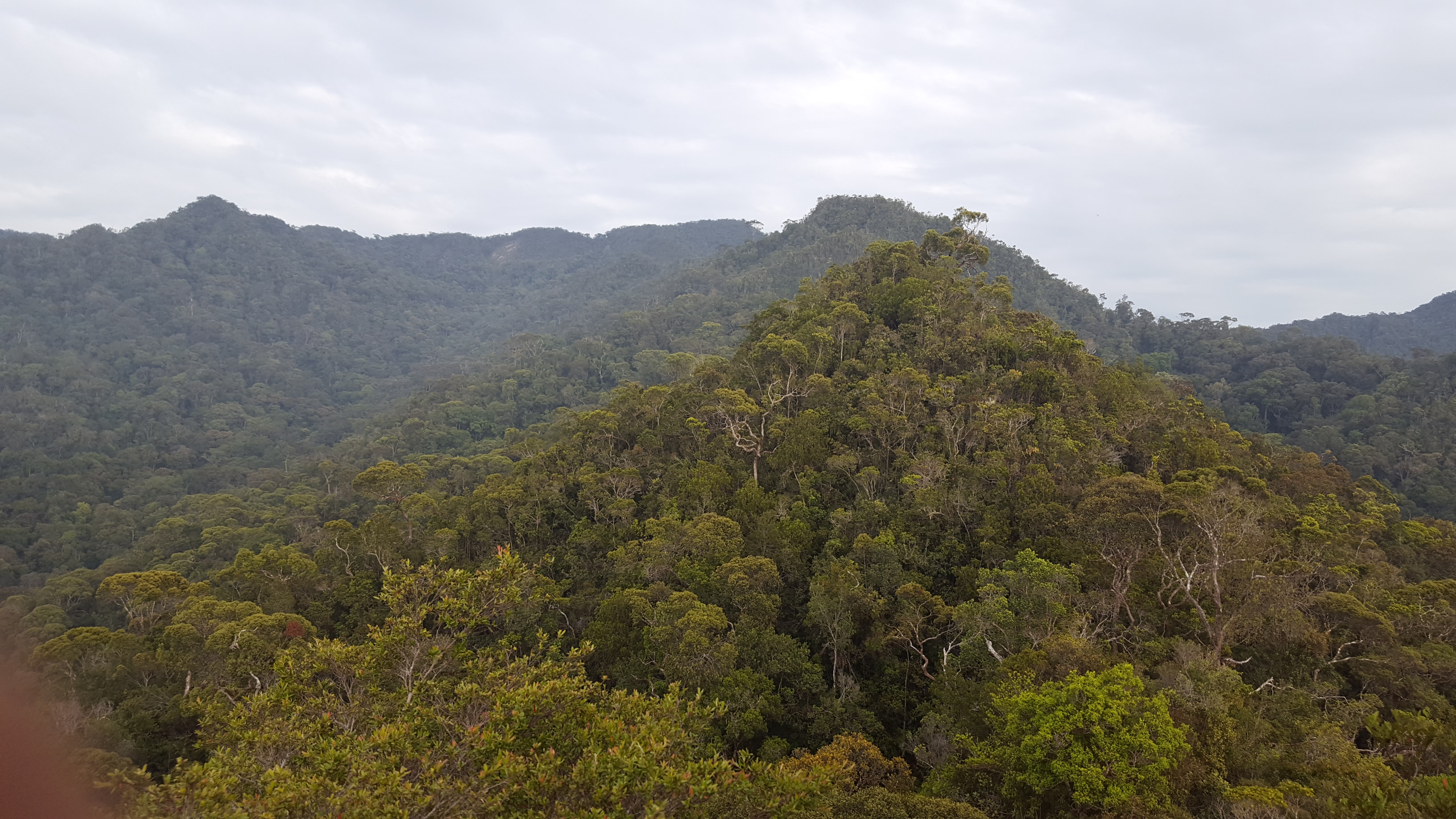
- Bukit Pagon in 2019

Highest point
- Elevation: 1,841 m (6,040 ft) (Note: Although Bukit Pagon is commonly cited as being 1,541 metres high, other sources have reported its elevation as 1,843 or even 1,850 metres.)
- Listing: Country high point
- Coordinates: 4°17′40″N 115°19′20″E

Naming
- Native name: Bukit Pagon (Malay)

Geography
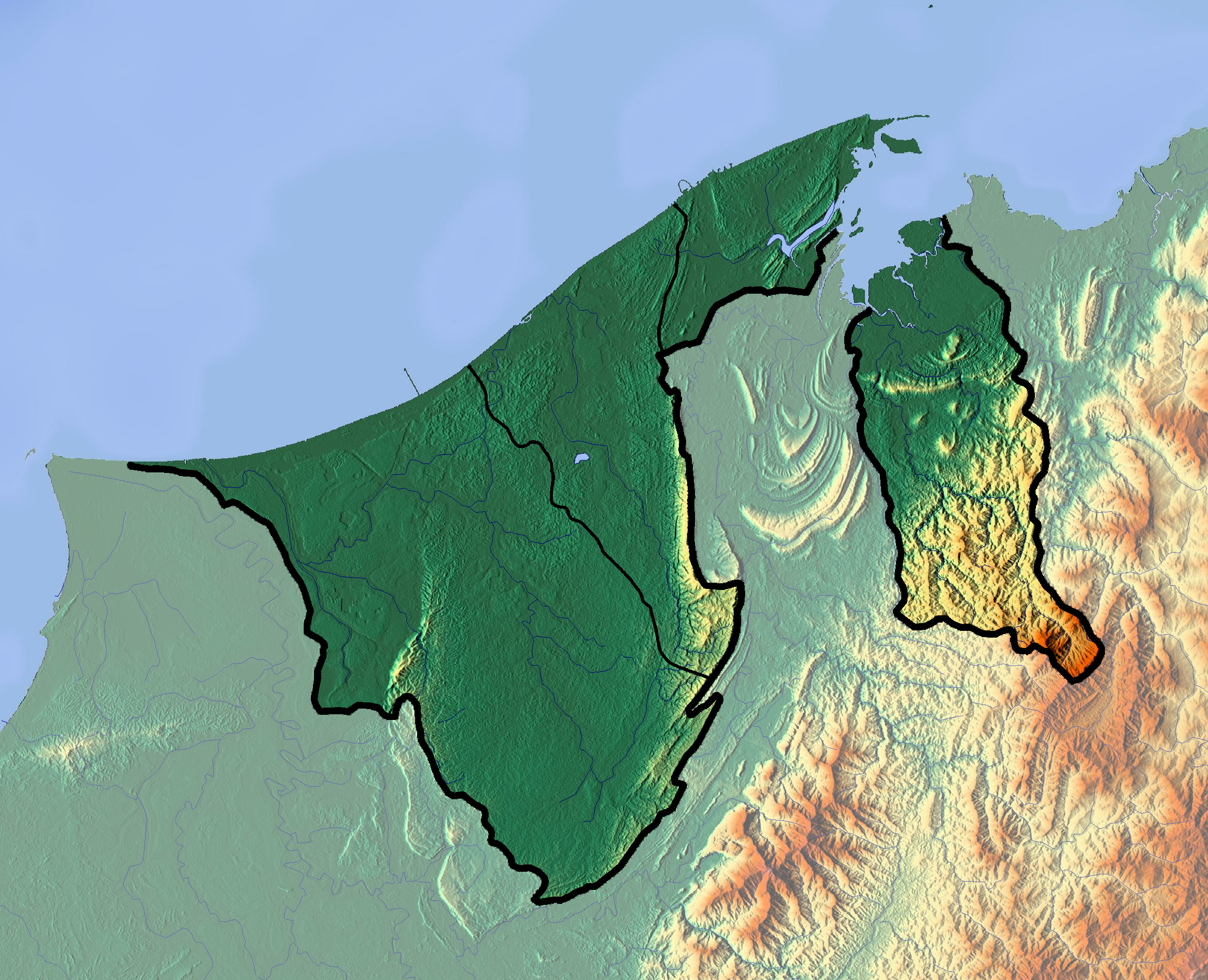
- Location within Brunei
- Country: Brunei
- Districts of Brunei: Temburong
- Mukim: Amo

Geology
- Mountain type: Hill

Bukit Pagon (BOO-kit PAH-gon) is the highest point in the country, rising to an elevation of 1,841 metres (6,040 ft) above sea level. It is located in the Temburong District of eastern Brunei, along the border with Sarawak. While most of Brunei consists of swampy coastal plains, Bukit Pagon forms part of the main mountain range that rises from the low hills of its interior.

== History ==
Following the 1962 Brunei revolt, Bukit Pagon was a strategic site in the final phase of the Indonesia–Malaysia confrontation. In December 1962, Harrison Force, composed of two thousand Iban irregulars, was deployed south of Brunei and succeeded in capturing around 100 of the North Kalimantan National Army (TNKU) and Clandestine Communist Organisation. Later in the month, Lieutenant Rupert van der Horst of 42 Commando led a patrol to investigate intelligence about a TNKU baseon Bukit Pagon. The seven-day operation lasted more than ten days, with the Marines having to rummage around for food. Intelligence eventually discovered that Indonesian Lieutenant Sumbi and his men were moving toward Bukit Pagon, located near the Sungei Pasia river, which would provide a water route to safety. In June 1966, Sumbi had crossed over into Brunei with 50 men, leading to a mass search by British and Commonwealth forces, including the 1/7th Gurkha Rifles and the Gurkha Parachute Company. The operation, which had been sparked by the discovery of a tin coffee label, led to a two-week search across rugged terrain around Bukit Pagon. Eventually, Lieutenant Colonel Carroll initiated intensified operations with the approval of HQ Central Brigade. By 3 September 1966, 46 of the original 50 insurgents were dead or captured, with the last four being arrested shortly afterwards by the Royal Brunei Malay Regiment. Sumbi himself was captured near Bukit Pagon, which effectively ended the incursion and coincided with the conclusion of the Confrontation.

== Flora and fauna ==
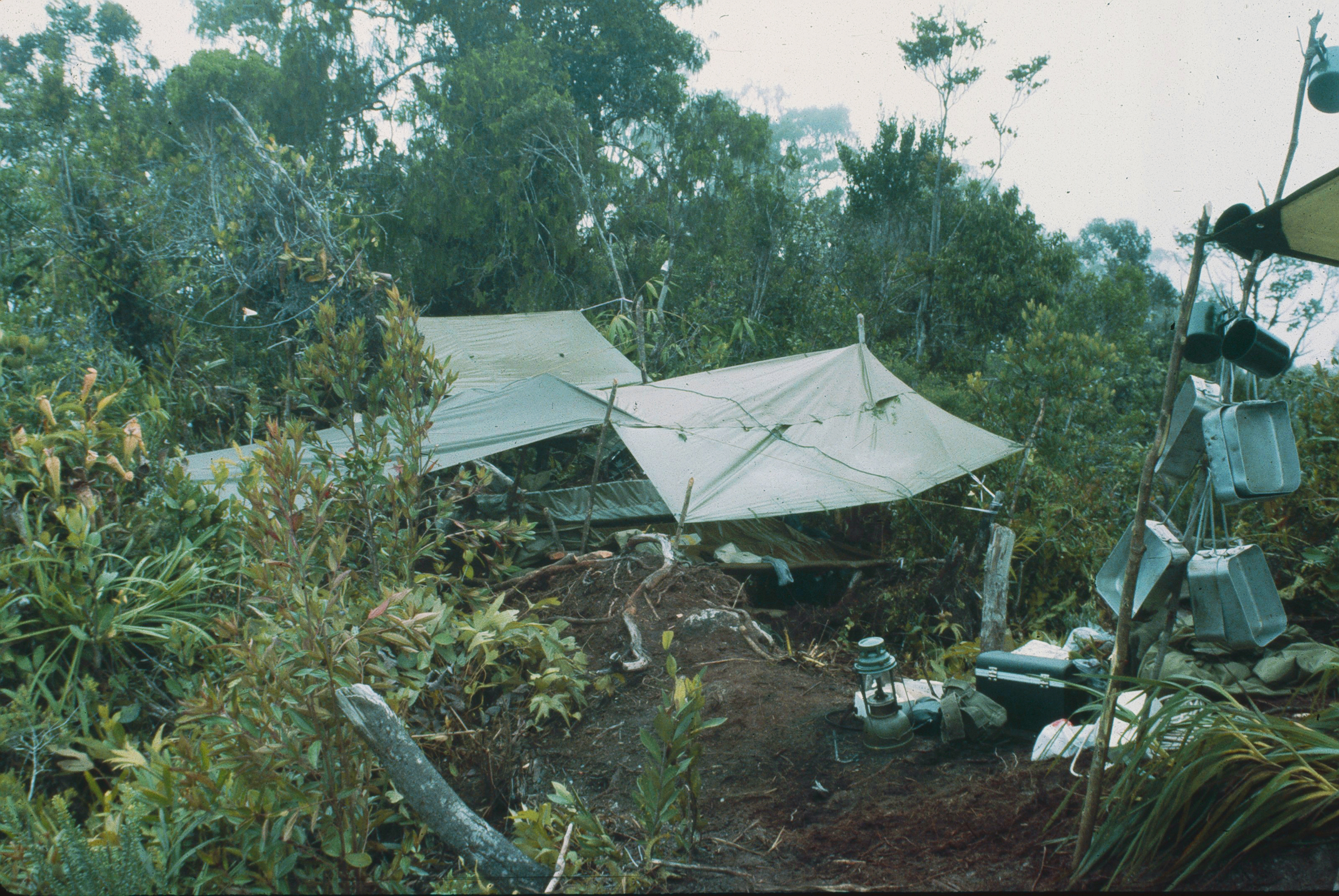
Pagon Hill campsite in 1982

Bukit Pagon is home to a range of species. Among its notable flora is the rare pitcher plant Nepenthes lowii, which can be found growing on the mountain's slopes. The area also supports moth fauna. One example is Biston inouei, described by Holloway in 1994, whose holotype male was collected at an elevation of 1,618 metres on Bukit Pagon. Another species, Chrysocraspeda pagon, was also described by Holloway in 1997, based on a specimen collected at 1,670 metres on the mountain.
