= Kampong Amo =

Village in Brunei

- Village
- Location in Brunei
- Coordinates: 4°37′34″N 115°06′17″E
- Country: Brunei
- District: Temburong
- Mukim: Amo

Government
  - Village head: Human Anak Muit

Area
  - Total: 5,178 ha (12,800 acres)

Population (2021)
  - Total: 394
  - Density: 7.61/km^{2} (19.7/sq mi)
- Time zone: UTC+8 (BNT)
- Postcode: PD1151

Kampong Amo is a village in Temburong District, Brunei, about 12 kilometres (7.5 mi) from the district town Bangar. It has an area of 5,178 hectares (12,800 acres). The population was 394 in 2021; primary ethnic groups include Iban, Murut and Malays.

== Administration ==
Kampong Amo is one of the villages within Mukim Amo. It is further divided into three administrative villages: Kampong Amo 'A', 'B' and 'C'. The current postcode is PD1151.

== Facilities ==
Amo Primary School is the village's government primary school. It also shares grounds with Amo Religious School, the village's government school for the country's Islamic religious primary education.
