= Ammo (disambiguation) =

Ammo is a colloquial term for ammunition.

Ammo or AMMO may also refer to:

- Ammo (record producer)
- DJ Ammo, stage name of Damien LeRoy
- Munitions Systems Specialist (U.S. Air Force), nicknamed "AMMO"
