= Mukim Amo =

Mukim of Brunei

- Mukim
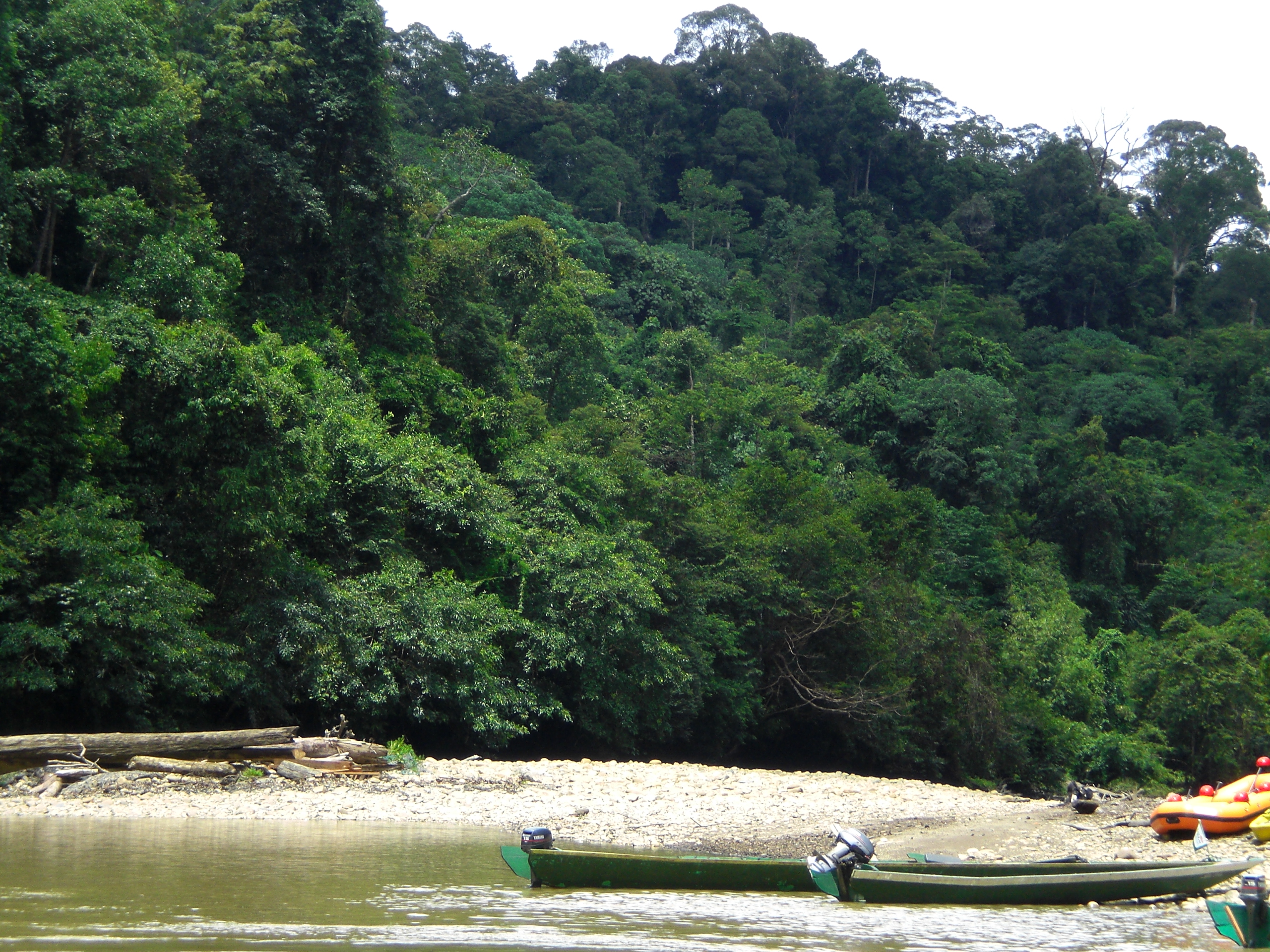
- Ulu Temburong National Park

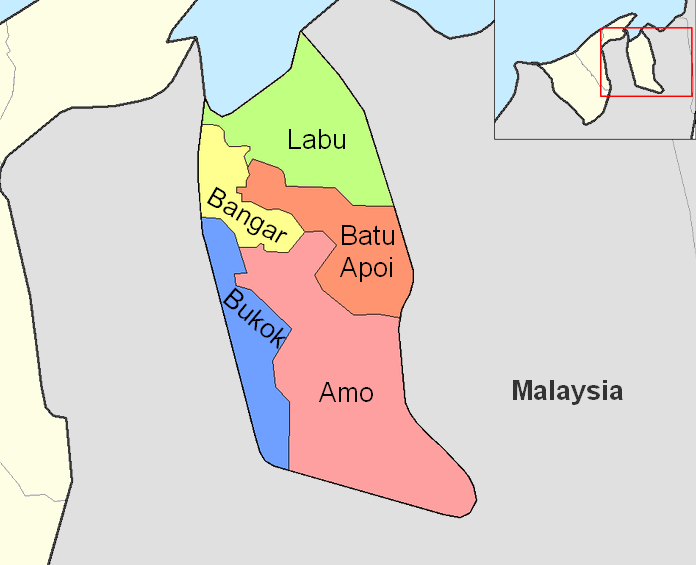
- Amo is in red.
- Coordinates: 4.5756533°N 115.1234737°E
- Country: Brunei
- District: Temburong

Government
  - Penghulu: Suhaili Badas

Area
  - Total: 542 km^{2} (209 sq mi)

Population (2021)
  - Total: 1,657
  - Density: 3.06/km^{2} (7.92/sq mi)
- Time zone: UTC+8 (BNT)
- Postcode: PDxx51

Mukim Amo is a mukim in Temburong District, Brunei. It has an area of 542 square kilometres (209 sq mi); the population was 1,657 in 2021.

== Etymology ==
The mukim is named after Kampong Amo, one of the villages it encompasses.

== Geography ==
The mukim is located in the eastern part of the district, bordering Mukim Batu Apoi to the north-east, Mukim Bokok to the west and Mukim Bangar to north-west, as well as the Malaysian state of Sarawak to the east and south.

=== Hills ===
- Pagon Hill is the highest hill in the country with a height of 1,850 metres (6,070 ft).
- Retak Hill has a height of 1,618 metres (5,308 ft).
- Tudal Hill has a height of 1,181 metres (3,875 ft).

== Demography ==
As of 2021 census, the population was 1,657 with 53.6% males and 46.4% females. The mukim had 364 households occupying 320 dwellings. The entire population lived in rural areas.

== Administration ==
As of 2021, the mukim comprised the following census of villages:

Settlements	Population (2021)	Ketua kampung (2024)
Kampong Amo (Note: Also administered as three villages i.e. Kampong Amo 'A', 'B' and 'C')	394	Hujan Anak Muit
Kampong Batang Duri	108	—N/a
Kampong Belaban (Note: Not to be confused with the village of the same name in Mukim Rambai, Tutong District)	29	—N/a
Kampong Biang	75	Dulamit bin Burot
Kampong Parit (Note: Not to be confused with the villages of the same name in Mukim Kianggeh and Mukim Pengkalan Batu in Brunei-Muara District)	227	Dulamit bin Burot
Kampong Selangan	241	Dulamit bin Burot
Kampong Sibulu	157	—N/a
Kampong Sibut (Note: Kampong Sibut and Kampong Sumbiling are administered under one village head since 1 March 2020.)	192	Suhaili bin Haji Badas
Kampong Sumbiling Baru (Note: Kampong Sumbiling Baru and Kampong Sumbiling Lama are collectively known as Kampong Sumbiling.)	91	Suhaili bin Haji Badas
Kampong Sumbiling Lama	143	Suhaili bin Haji Badas

== Infrastructure ==
=== Schools ===
The government primary schools in the mukim include:

- Amo Primary School
- Selangan Primary School

Meanwhile, the government schools for the country's Islamic religious primary education include:

- Amo Religious School
- Selangan Religious School

=== Mosques ===
- Kampong Selangan Mosque — inaugurated on 14 December 1979; it can accommodate 200 worshippers.
- Balai Ibadat Kampong Sibut — constructed in 1993 and completed in the following year; it can accommodate 160 worshippers.
