= Kampong Labu Estate =

Village in Brunei

Labu Estate
- Village
- Kampong Labu Estate
- Location in Brunei
- Coordinates: 4°45′43″N 115°11′01″E
- Country: Brunei
- District: Temburong
- Mukim: Labu

Government
  - Village head: Sulaiman Nasir

Area
  - Total: 7.2132 km^{2} (2.7850 sq mi)

Population (2021)
  - Total: 125
  - Density: 17.3/km^{2} (44.9/sq mi)
- Time zone: UTC+8 (BNT)
- Postcode: PB1151

Labu Estate (Malay: Kampung Labu Estate), known fully as Kampong Labu Estate, is a village in Temburong District, Brunei, about 16 kilometres (9.9 mi) from the district town Bangar. The population was 125 in 2021. It is one of the villages within Mukim Labu. The postcode is PB1151.

== Etymology ==
According to Ketua Kampung Labu Estate, Awang Haji Sulaiman bin Haji Nasir stated, Kampong Labu is in conjunction with the name given by the rubber estate operator in the village which is Labu Estet (Labu Estate). The name Labu Estate is widely used in all estate management including mailing addresses, even the villagers also use the name to refer to their village.

== History ==
The village began with the initial settlement of a group of Murut tribes who inhabited an area upstream of Sungai Labu (Labu River) in the 19th century who also inhabited several other areas such as Sungai Senukoh, Sungai Sipal and Sungai Meragang. The settlement in the upper reaches of Sungai Labu later developed when there was migration of people from outside the district who were so attracted to the agricultural enterprise in the village and then built houses on the banks of Sungai Labu until it developed into a village called Kampong Labu.

The British opted to implement rubber planting in their tropical colonies, including as India and Malaya, in the 1870s, which marked the beginning of the rubber industry in Asia. Rubber was Brunei's primary agricultural crop, its most significant cash crop, and one of the country's main employment in the first half of the 20th century, along with the British Malayan Petroleum Company (BMPC), the cutch industry, and the government. During this point, the rubber sector started to play a significant role in Southeast Asia's economies, particularly Brunei.

In contrast, rubber seedlings were first imported to Brunei in 1908. Mr. Abrahamson planted the first rubber trees in the Sungai Labu region that same year. The estate was given to the Mr. Jonston-run Brunei (Borneo) Rubber and Land Company. More and more rubber plantations began to open in Brunei as a result of the development of the modern automobile in the 1890s. Huge rubber plantations were primarily owned by European businesses, such as the British (Borneo) Rubber and Land Company, the Liverpool (Brunei) Para Rubber Estate, and the Brunei Estates. The Kumbang Pasang Estate and the Gadong Estate were then two significant estates close to Brunei town. Brunei-Muara District, where Brunei first shipped rubber to Britain and the United States in 1914, supplanted Temburong District as the industry's top producer in 1919.In 1916, the production yield was increased up to 31,775 pounds (14,413 kg). Local people were employed at first, but by 1930, the 300 hectares (740 acres) rubber plantation had also hired foreign workers. By 1934, the estate had a total of 107 laborers, and a population of 317.

To aid in the growth of rubber plantations, the government created an agricultural station in Kilanas in 1933. The adoption of a new smoke rubber production method in the middle of the 1930s raised the quality of rubber produced and consequently increased the cost of rubber. The 1950s saw the maximum amount of rubber output which was (2,558 tonnes (2,820 tons), but afterwards, it started to fall. The Government Rubber Estate at Labu not only failed to meet the constitutionally mandated financial standards (as did the Estates at Gadong and Berakas), but it also accrued debts to the Government of Brunei of $40,151, as stated in paragraph 25 of the State Auditor's Report on 1960. These debts, which represented money borrowed from the Miscellaneous Advance Fund, reached a total of $221,828.65 by 31 December 1965, and the State Financial Officer communicated his concern to the government about the growing losses that these Estates were suffering in April 1966. The end of the rubber industry era was signaled by the Brunei government's purchase of Brunei (Borneo) Rubber and Land Company Limited in 1968.

== Labu Estate Rubber Industrial Site ==
Labu Estate Rubber Industrial Site is located 112 kilometres (70 mi) from Bandar Seri Begawan and 16 kilometres (9.9 mi) from Bangar Town. Compared to other locations in the nation, Labu Estate still contains the majority of the remnants of the rubber industry. The Labu Estate Rubber Industrial Site now serves as a reminder of the last remaining commercial farming in this nation and provides proof of the early agricultural industry's remnants. For the purpose of remembering Brunei's early 20th-century commercial agricultural economy, it is crucial to conserve and protect this location.

According to the Penghulu of Mukim Labu Abdurahman Nasir, the Labu Estate Rubber Industrial Site has the potential to grow into one of Brunei's tourism destinations and complement its current function as a venue for instruction for students and researchers. The Labu Estate Rubber Industrial Site, which has been designed in the style of an "open site museum," according to Abdurahman, has important historical, economic, and cultural assets. In February 2006, the Museums Department got royal approval to gazete a 9 acres (3.6 ha) portion of the site for preservation under the Antiquities and Treasure Trove Act of 1967 (as amended in 1984, 1991, and 2002). The Labu Estate Rubber Industrial Site Research and Conservation Project, Phase I, Launching Ceremony took place on 12 June 2007. The site of the Labu Estate Rubber Industrial Site is being restored and preserved, and additional building reconstruction, including that of the original Manager Office, Smoke House, Dry and Wet Godown, Rubber Drying Site, weighting scales and generator.

In August 2010, the former Temburong Acting District Officer, Afero Eswandy Mohamad, formally opened it as an open site museum. The Museums Department and Kampong Labu Estate Consultative Council jointly oversee the facility. The site has gained popularity among high school and college students since it was officially launched, as well as among scholars who want to learn more about the rubber manufacturing site. According to him, this site is the only one in the nation that is specifically dedicated to the rubber sector.

The site museum is divided into three zones which are:

- Zone 1 – Relict area of old buildings, equipment and tools used by the rubber company.
- Zone 2 – The area of the former site of the manager office and the remains of a small well belonging to the manager.
- Zone 3 – Structures left over from old mainholes, old tanks, pole structures, old pipes, iron fences and roofs that have been buried for a long time

== Economy ==
According to the ketua kampong, the products of the river in the village, such as fish and lobster 'Labu', have the potential to be promoted as village products in addition to the products currently produced through Economic Project committee members of the Majlis Perundingan Kampung (MPK) Labu Estate, namely shrimp crackers, yellow pumpkin crackers and sweets.

== Infrastructure ==
Labu Estate Primary School is the village's government primary school. It also shares grounds with Labu Estate Religious School, the village's government school for the country's Islamic religious primary education.

The village mosque is Kampong Labu Estate Mosque. It was inaugurated on 18 October 1982 and can accommodate 200 worshippers.
