= Temburong District =

District of Brunei

Coordinates: 4°35′N 115°10′E

Temburong District Daerah Temburong (Malay) دائيره تمبوروڠ (Jawi)
- District
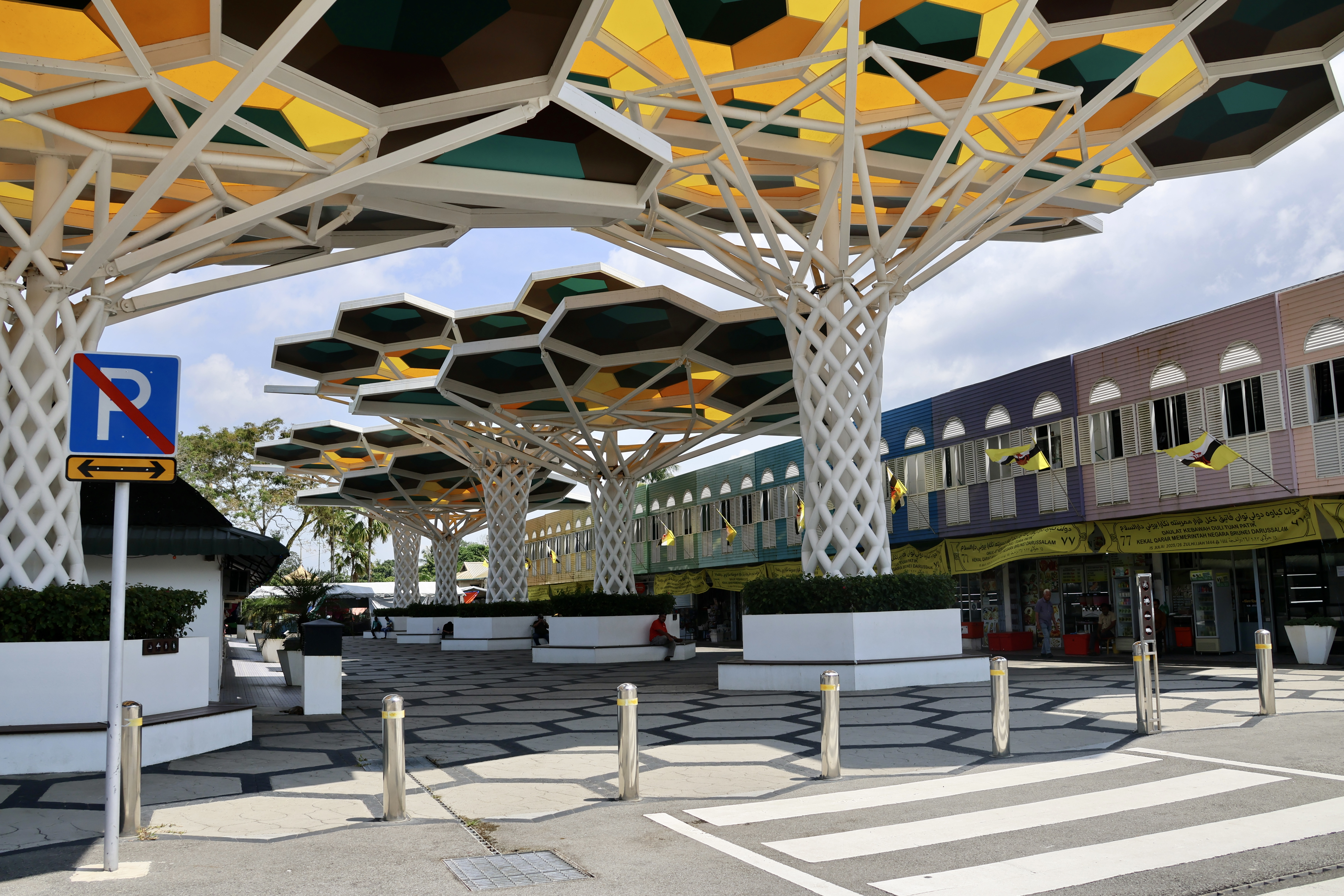
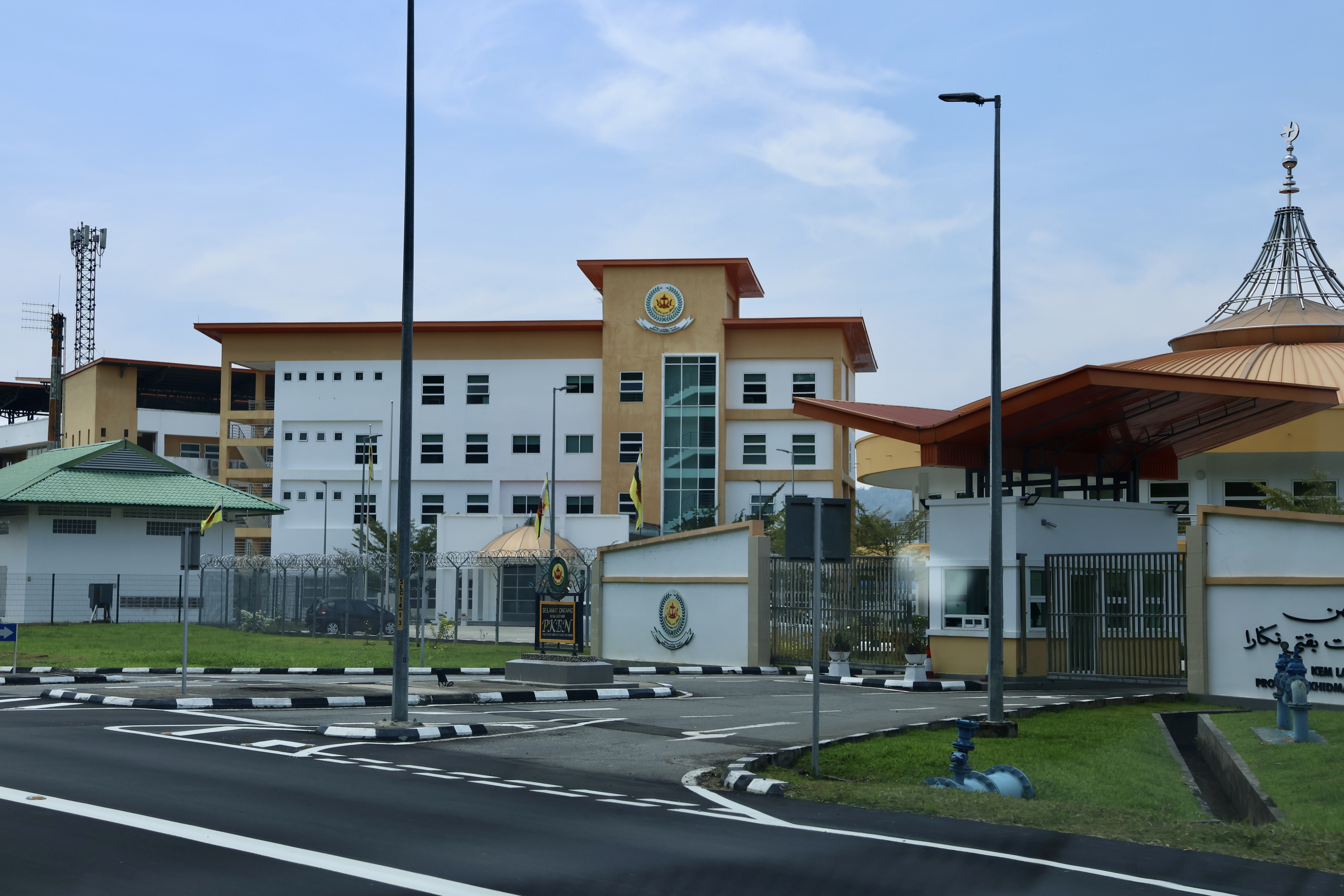
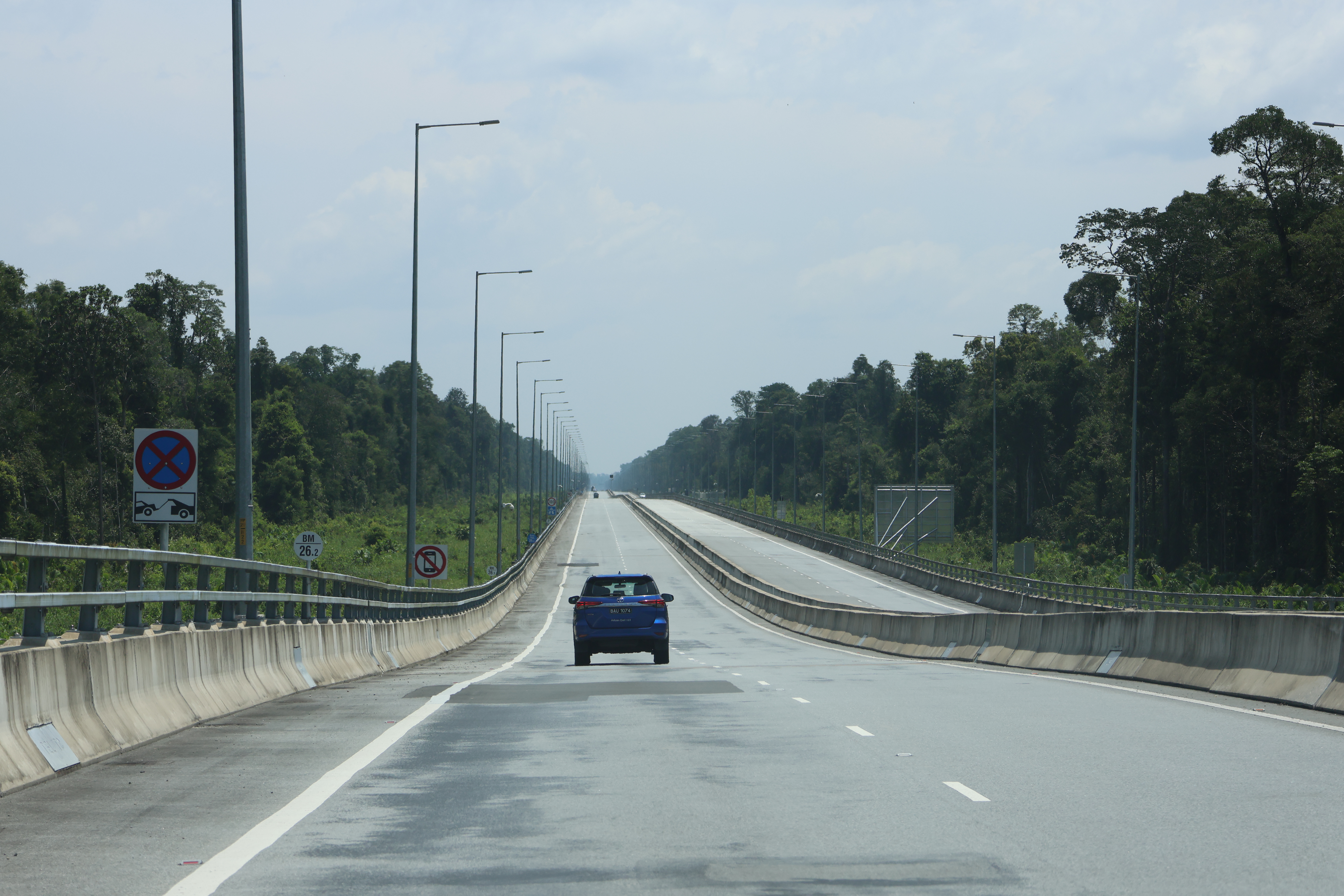
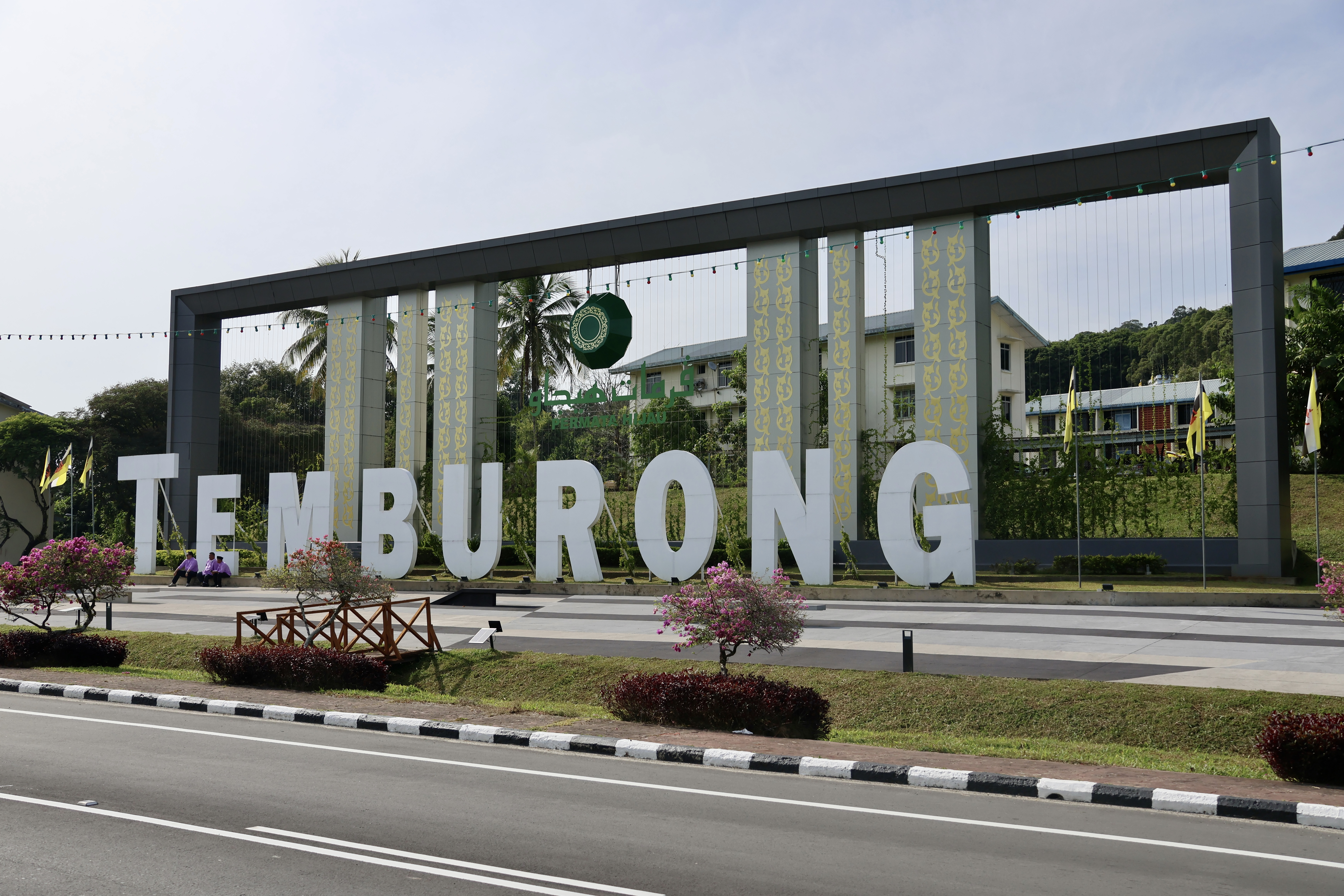
- Clockwise from top left: Bangar Town Super Tree, Batu Apoi Training Camp, Temburong sign, Sultan Haji Omar Ali Saifuddien Bridge
- Nickname: Green Jewel (Permata Hijau)
- Country: Brunei
- Administrative centre: Bangar Town
- Mukims: 5 (see Mukims)

Government
  - Type: Municipality
  - Body: Temburong District Office
  - DO: Pengiran Mohammad Yassin (acting)

Area
  - Total: 1,306 km^{2} (504 sq mi)
  - Rank: 2nd in Brunei
- Highest elevation: 1,850 m (6,070 ft)

Population (2024)
  - Total: 9,600
  - Rank: 4th in Brunei
  - Density: 7.4/km^{2} (19/sq mi)
- Time zone: UTC+8 (BNT)
- Postcode: P
- Area code: 5
- Website: www.temburong.gov.bn

Temburong District (Malay: Daerah Temburong; Jawi: دائيره تمبوروڠ) or simply known as Temburong (TUHM-boo-rong; Malay: [tǝmburoŋ]), is the second largest and least populated district in Brunei. An exclave, it is divided from the rest of Brunei by the Malaysian district of Limbang to its west. It has an area of 1,306 square kilometres (504 sq mi), and As of 2021 its population was 9,444. The district is also home to its administrative centre, Bangar Town (Pekan Bangar), as well as the Temburong River, which is the country's third longest river and Ulu Temburong National Park.

== Geography ==
Bukit Pagon, the highest point in the country, sits at the district's southern tip and from there the Temburong River runs down through low hills and swampy lowland to its estuary on the northern shore.

== History ==
Brunei was divided in two when the White Rajahs seized the area around the Limbang River in 1890. The British not only took no action to halt the annexation, but also officially acknowledged its legitimacy. Over the next few years, Brunei was under constant pressure from Sarawak to absorb the entire country but was able to save its independence by defending it with diplomatic missions, letters, and petitions to Britain. Eventually, the North Borneo authorities who wanted Brunei to stay as a buffer state between itself and Sarawak supported their efforts.

== Ecology ==
The Royal Geographical Society and Universiti Brunei Darussalam (UBD) are coordinating international research into the tropical rainforests in the region. Although it is inaccessible, it has substantial gravel reserves that have been actively mined to satisfy rising building demand. This then gives place to montane vegetation with stunted, gnarled trees covered in mosses in the upper Temburong region as the ground climbs over 1,500 metres (4,900 ft). This is in contrast to a major portion of Brunei, which has managed to preserve its wooded terrain as most people live around the shore and the majority of its economic growth has been centred around hydrocarbon fossil resources, these woods have not been extensively exploited.

It is suggested that a few tiny islands covered in mangroves be designated as nature sanctuaries because of their ecological significance and rich biodiversity. Proposals for conservation include islands like Pulau Kitang, Siarau, and Selirong; Pulau Kitang may support the proboscis monkey. Because these places are important for fisheries, biological filters, and sediment stability, the Biology Department at the UBD is in favour of their protection. Even if there may be restricted development for social or commercial reasons, it is recommended that any disturbance adhere to comprehensive environmental impact evaluations.

The Temburong River is an integral element of the Brunei estuary, which is a vital nursery and feeding ground for marine life, especially penaeid shrimps. As such, the district plays an important role in Brunei's coastal environment. The estuary, which is made up of deep channels and mudbanks rich in organic matter, receives a lot of freshwater from rivers such as Temburong and Trusan, which causes its salinity levels to fluctuate. Salinity and turbidity are influenced by seasonal rainfall patterns; during inter-monsoon times, salinity is low and turbidity is high, and the estuary flushes in two to four days.

== Administration ==
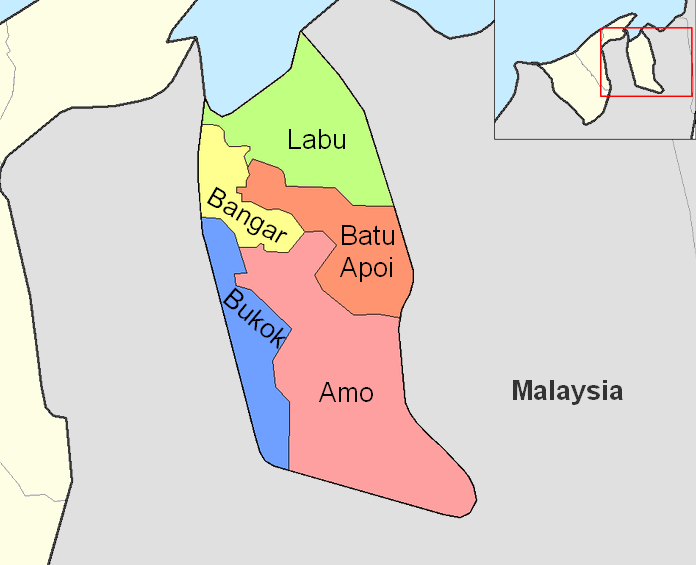
Mukims of Temburong

The district is administered by the Temburong District Office (Jabatan Daerah Temburong), a government department under the Ministry of Home Affairs. The district is subdivided into 5 mukims, namely:

Mukim	Population (2021)	Penghulu (2024)
Amo	1,667	Haji Suhaili bin Haji Badas
Bokok	3,812	Haji Suhaili bin Haji Badas
Bangar	2,112	Haji Sulaiman bin Haji Nasir
Batu Apoi	1,355	Haji Sulaiman bin Haji Nasir
Labu	508	Haji Sulaiman bin Haji Nasir

These are further subdivided into 76 Kampongs (Villages).

According to the Constitution, the district is to be represented in the Legislative Council, the state legislature, by up to 2 members. As of 2023, one member has been appointed to represent the district in the legislature.

== Demographics ==
The indigenous language of Murut, also called Lun Bawang, is mainly spoken in Temburong District. In 2021, Temburong District had a population of 9,444 people, with 5,031 males and 4,413 females. There were 2,056 households and 1,892 occupied living quarters in the district. This reflects a slight population increase from 2011, when the district had 8,852 people.

=== Religion ===
Religions in Temburong district (2016)
Religion	Percent
Islam	73.35%
Christianity	12.96%
Buddhism	1.29%
Other or not stated	12.40%

Islam is the predominant religion in Temburong, followed by Christianity and a smaller proportion of Buddhists. A notable percentage of the population also identifies with other religions or did not state their affiliation.

== Transportation ==
Brunei Bay and Malaysia divide Temburong from the rest of the country. As a result, until 2020, the only ways for Bruneians to go to the capital or other regions were by boat or by entering Malaysia. The Pekan Bangar Boat Terminal, was constructed in 2009 as part of the 2007–2012 National Development Plan (Malay: Rancangan Kemajuan Negara, RKN) at an approximate cost of $1.4 million.

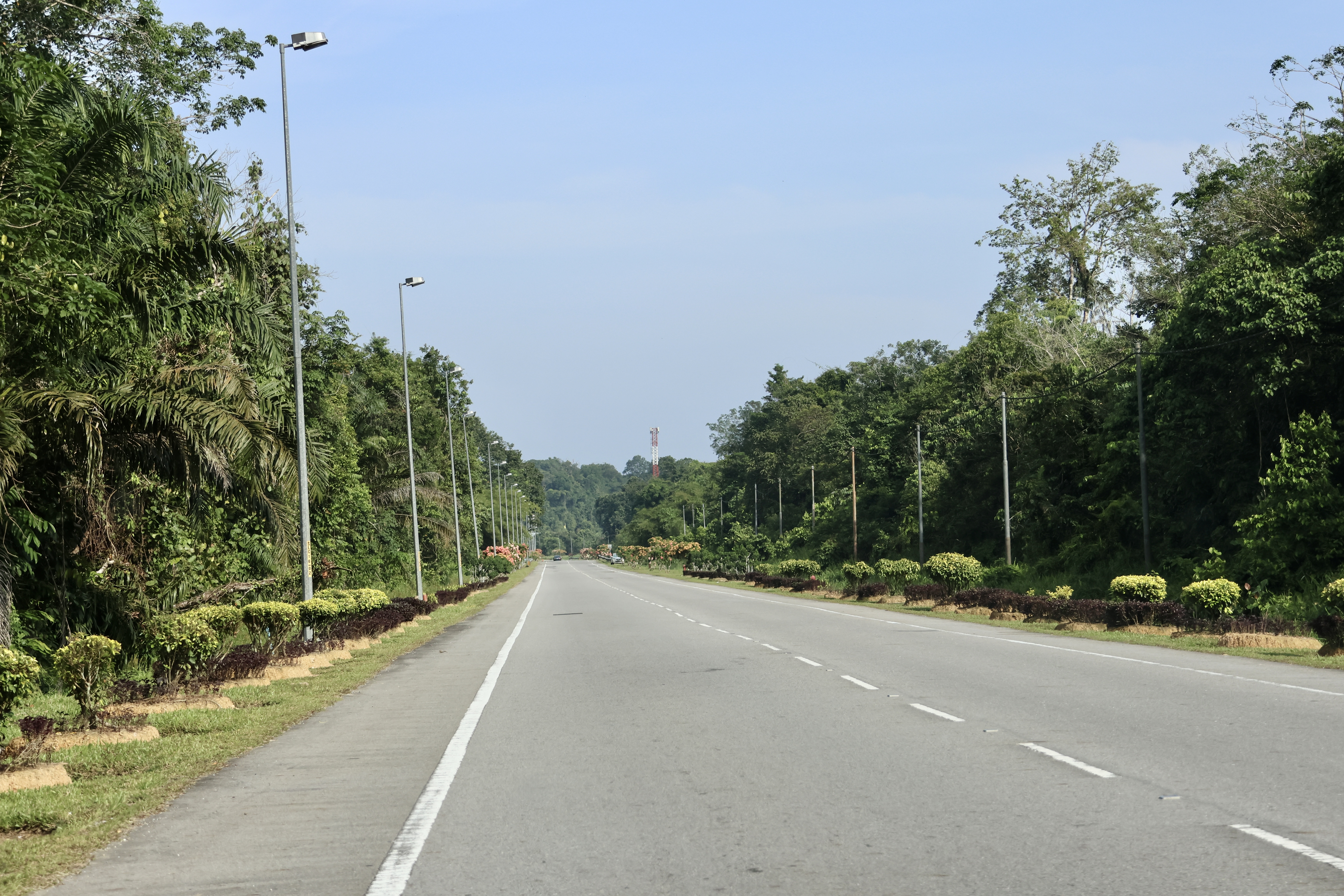
Jalan Labu

As of 2008 there were 2,972.11 kilometres of state, district, and military highways in Brunei. The RKN 2007-2012 allocated over $600 million for highway projects, road building, paving, maintenance, and resurfacing, and showed the government's continued investment in road development. In addition to studies for additional road and bridge links between Brunei–Muara and Temburong, the plan called for infrastructure upgrades in the Temburong District, including correcting earth slips, modernising high-density roadways, replacing wooden bridges, and rehabilitating important highways.

The Pandaruan Bridge, completed in 2013, is one of four bridges built as part of the RKN. A five-lane bridge that spans the Pandaruan River and forms part of Brunei's border with Sarawak, It alleviated the ferry bottlenecks and included approach ramps and connecting roads to Temburong and Limbang. A long-awaited land link between mainland Brunei and the exclave of Temburong was created in 2020 with the opening of the Sultan Haji Omar Ali Saifuddien Bridge across Brunei Bay. The drive from Bandar Seri Begawan was reduced by 75%, from two or more hours (via Sarawak, requiring four international passport checks) to approximately thirty minutes.

== Economy ==
=== Agriculture ===
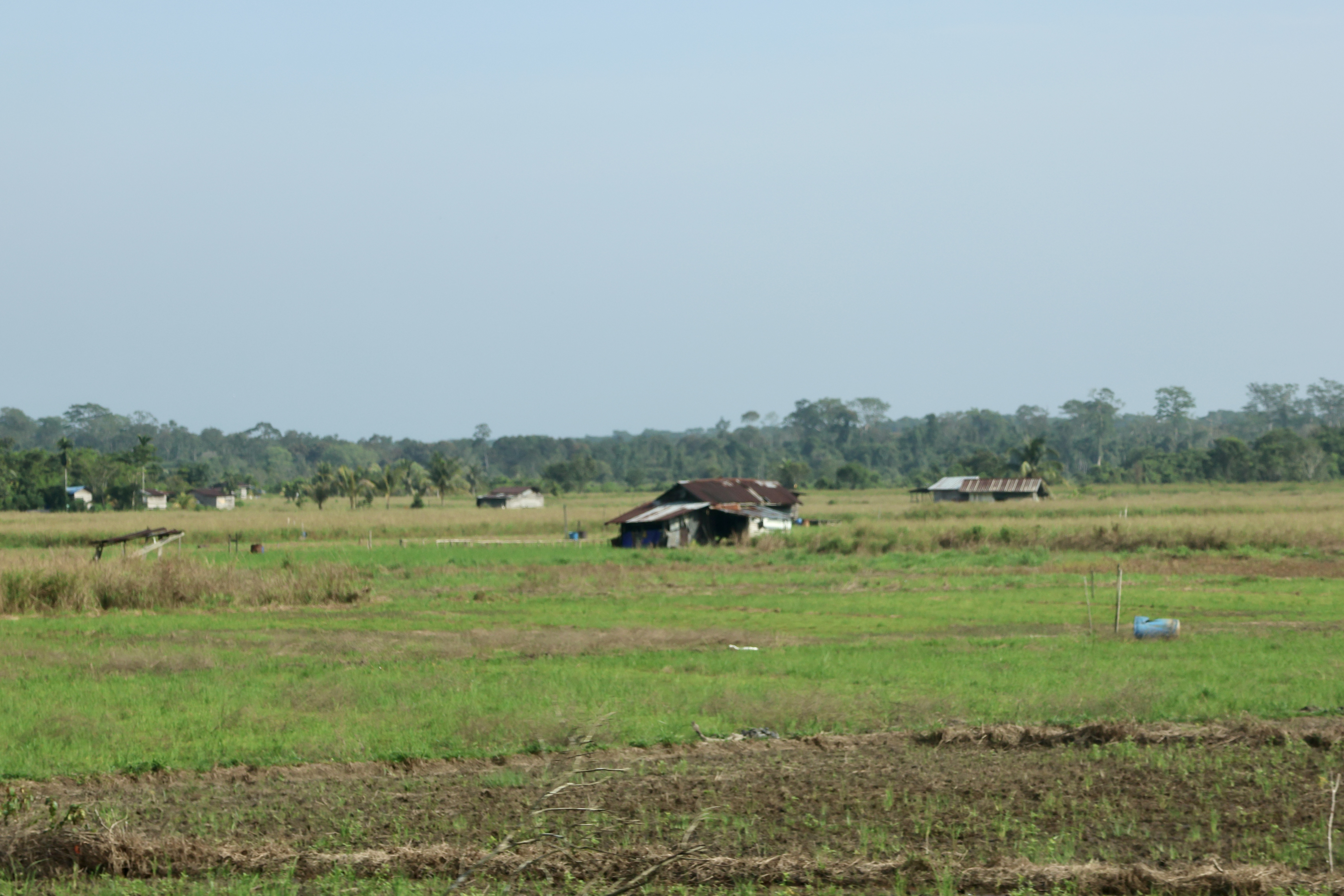
Farmland along Jalan Labu

As part of its economic diversification, Brunei has prioritised agriculture, which has led to significant development. With $131.6 million from cattle, $41.35 million from crops, and $52.53 million from agri-food, the agricultural industry brought in over $200 million in 2008, almost double its 1999 earnings. The "Beras Laila" rice type, which is high in protein, low in carbs, and able to be harvested twice a year, strengthened food security and proved to be a success for the paddy plantation industry.

Three primary locations have been designated for paddy production in Temburong District: Senukoh (80 hectares), Selapon (150 hectares), and Lakiun–Perdayan (700 hectares). With 382.4 hectares and 264.52 metric tons of rice produced annually, Temburong was the second-largest paddy plantation area in Brunei by 2008. Varieties grown there included Adan, Bario, Pusu, and Laila. To further enhance the district's agricultural potential, 1,852.76 hectares in Temburong have been set aside for agricultural development in places like Labu Estate, Selapon, Senukoh, Lakiun, Semabat, and Kampong Puni.

As of 2022 Temburong District had a total of 2,063.17 hectares designated as agricultural development areas. Of this, 265.92 hectares were allocated to farmers, while 611.25 hectares were used for stations or other purposes. A total of 2,063.17 hectares of land were designated as Agricultural Development Areas (KKP). Of this, 265.92 hectares were awarded to farmers, while 611.25 hectares were allocated for stations or other uses. The primary agricultural activities include fruit cultivation, paddy farming, and integrated crops. Key areas such as KKP Labu Estate focus on fruits, vegetables, and broiler farming, while KKP Selapon and Senukoh areas are dedicated to both fruits and paddy cultivation. Several agricultural stations are also established, including in Perdayan and Puni.

=== Agrifood ===
The government wants to expand sales in the agri-food sector by 512% to $340 million by 2015 from $52.53 million in 2008. 450 ducks may currently be raised on the 0.7-acre Hazeeyah Agro Farm in Temburong, which is run by Nur Haziyah Abdul Rahman and her husband Muhd Hazim Abdul Rahim Mangkiling. The farm began in 2015 with 12 ducks.

In 2022, 78.51 hectares of land are allocated for livestock activities. This includes areas for broiler (chicken meat) production (2.2 hectares), buffalo farming (31.07 hectares), cattle farming (28.17 hectares), and smaller allocations for goats (5.6 hectares), deer (1.7 hectares), and sheep (6.65 hectares). Additionally, there are 3.12 hectares used for miscellaneous livestock, but no land allocated for egg production or slaughtering centers.

=== Forestry ===
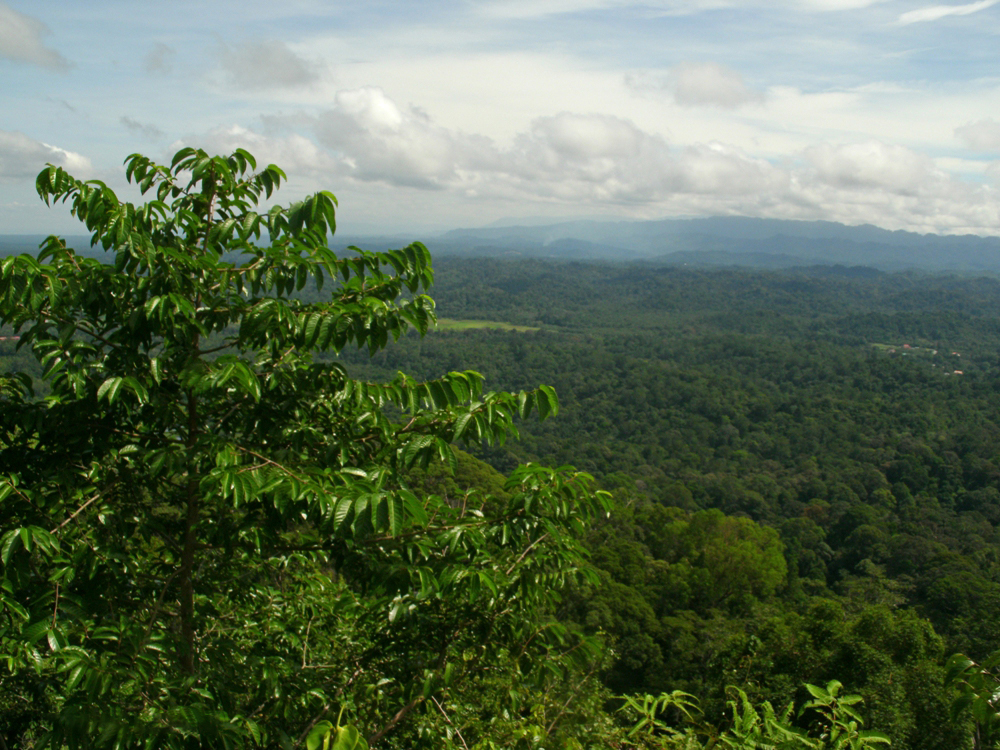
Peradayan Forest Reserve

The greatest concentration of mangrove timber in Brunei is found in the Temburong District, where important species including Bruguiera, Xylocarpus, and Rhizophora apiculata are found. There is an increasing supply of mangrove timber projected for the Selirong and Labu Forest Reserves, where timber production is a significant activity. The need for firewood and charcoal is predicted to decrease, but the demand for goods like heaps and poles is anticipated to increase. Depletion of mangrove resources is not projected despite predicted increases in demand; nonetheless, in order to maintain long-term conservation and utilisation, a sustainable mangrove forest management plan is advised. Despite extensive clearing, the district's mangrove forests—especially in Selirong and Labu—still include sizeable tracts of unbroken old-growth forest. Selirong has 1,458 hectares of old-growth forest, compared to 3,140.6 hectares in the Labu forest. Despite being unreachable by water, these regions are home to important species that produce lumber, such as Xylocarpus spp. and Rhizophora apiculata.

=== Fisheries ===
A prawn farm was established on a 1,000-acre site at Biang on the Temburong River as part of efforts to boost fisheries development; however, it eventually failed commercially owing to issues with water quality control, management, and labour shortages. Large-scale activities have been hampered by the absence of local knowledge, even with government assistance in the form of infrastructure, hatcheries, and fishing cooperatives.

=== Quarrying ===
The district is renowned for its industrial quarry site. This region is home to various quarry industries. Temburong District, a top producer of high-quality stones, manufactures interlocking paving blocks in addition to providing a steady and enough supply of aggregates for sale and usage in road building. It also makes ready-mixed concrete and asphalt premix.

== Development ==
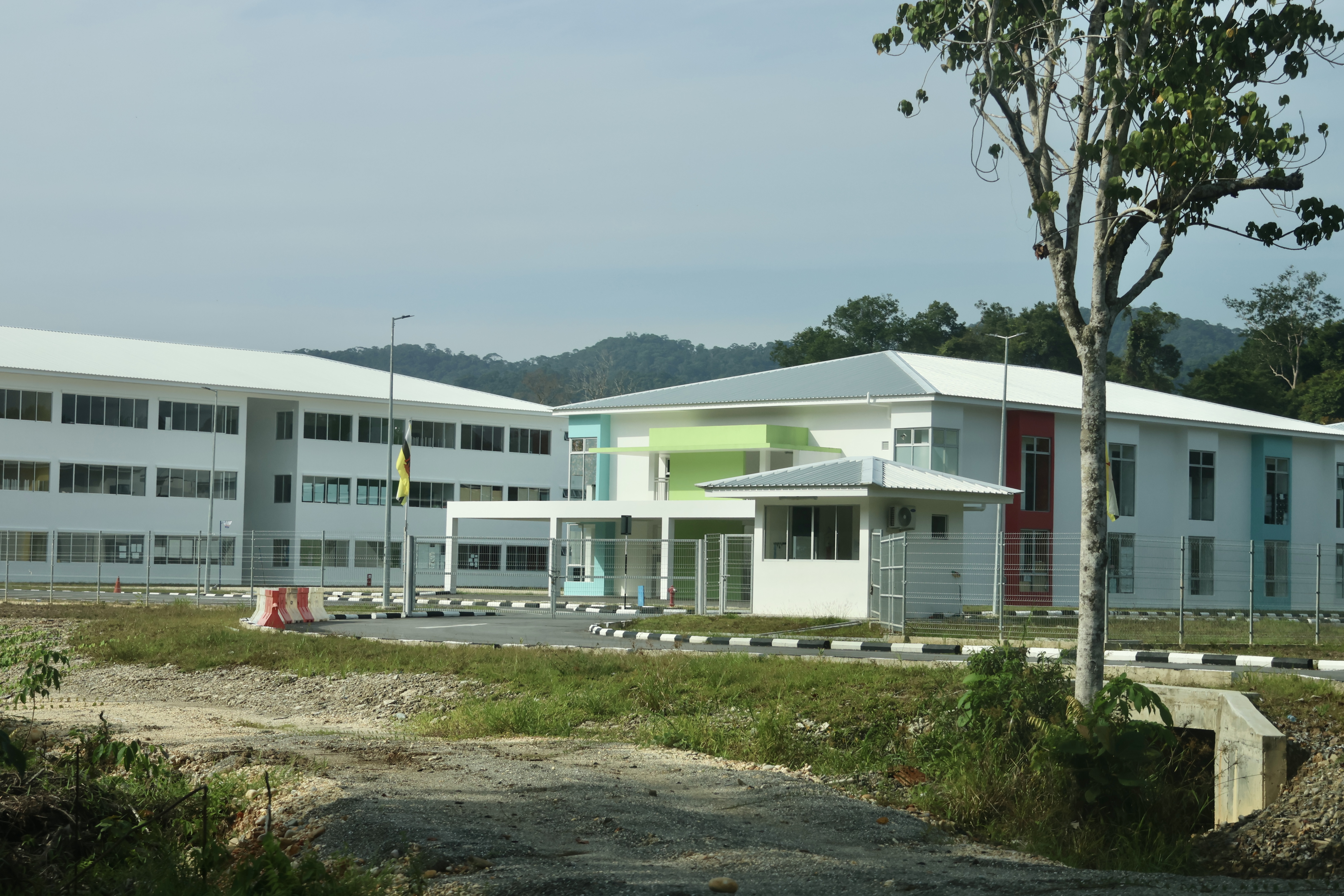
Sultan Hassan Secondary School

Constructed for about $9.9 million, the Pengiran Isteri Hajah Mariam Hospital is the primary referral facility. Furthermore, Kampong Labu Estate and Kampong Amo are home to two health clinics, and the Flying Doctor Service provides medical care to places that are inaccessible by road or water. In addition, the district contains 13 elementary schools, including both public and private ones, and one secondary school, named Sultan Hassan Secondary School. This indicates that educational facilities have been expanded to accommodate the increasing population.

Since the 1950s, the Bruneian government has ensured that its population with the National Housing Programme. This was followed by a number of additional schemes, including the Infill Scheme (IS), Temporary Occupation-of-Land License (TOL), and Landless Indigenous Citizens Housing Scheme (STKRJ). The Kampung Rataie Landless Indigenous Citizens Housing Scheme and Rataie National Housing Scheme, together with five Iban longhouses (Kampong Sibut, Kampong Sumbiling Baru, Kampong Semabat, Kampong Amo, and Kampong Lepong Baru) are among the housing efforts in Temburong District.

In order to keep up with the increasing demand for clean water, the Sumbiling Water Treatment Plant is scheduled for renovation and expansion. Bangar Town will also receive a new sewage system, as it does not yet have a centralised network. The RKN 8 covers growing power demands estimated for the 2007–2012 period, with peak demand reaching 454 megawatts by the end of 2005. It also includes drainage improvements in the district. Although gas is the primary fuel used to generate energy, a new $4 million power station with a 2.56 megawatt capacity has been erected in Kampong Belingos, Temburong, and plans are in place to expand it by adding two 3-megawatt diesel generators. In addition, there are plans to add ten additional street lights to the district and link Temburong's network with the Brunei–Muara and Berakas Power Management Company networks.

== Tourism ==
=== Commerce ===
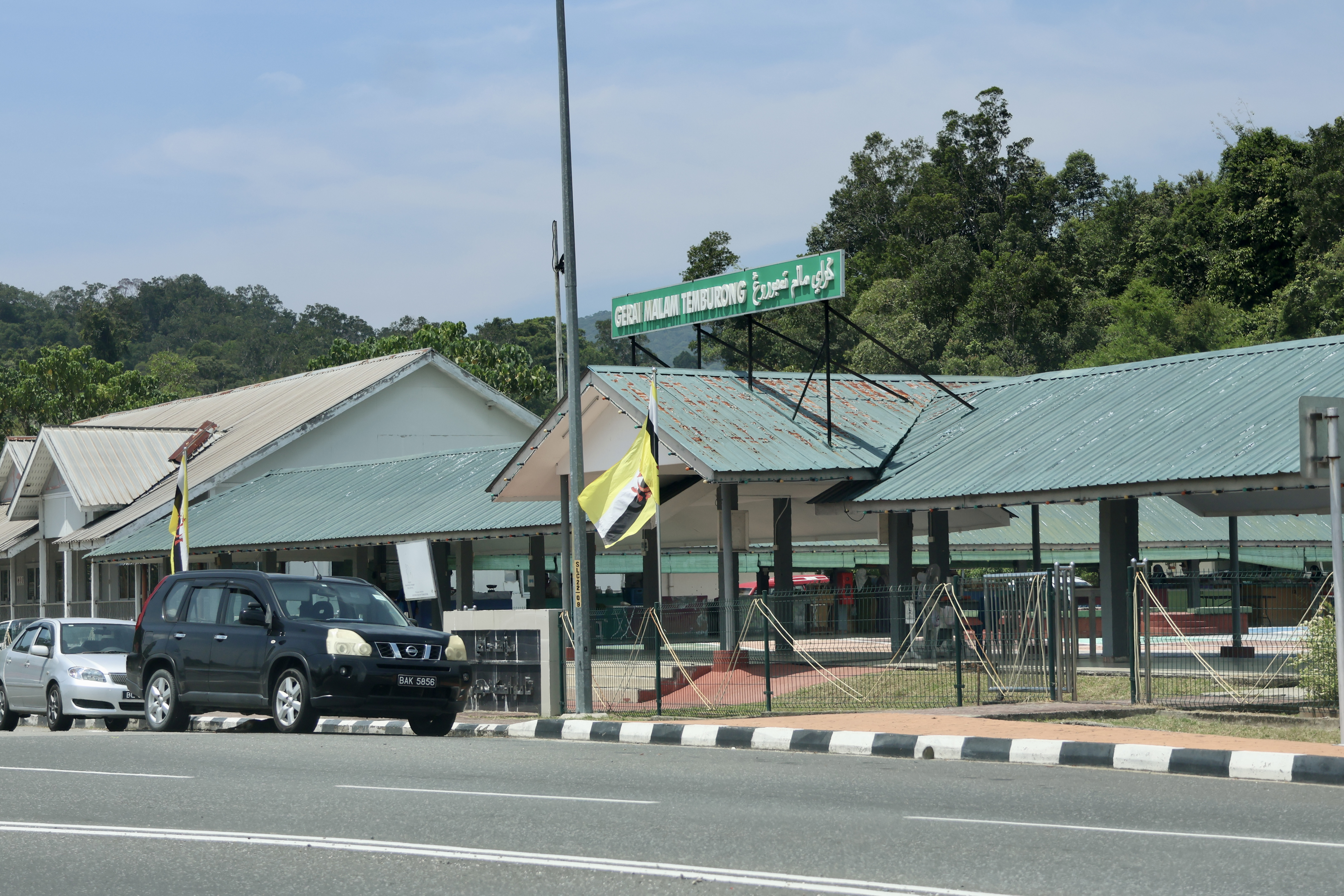
Tamu Muhibah Aneka Selera

Popular regional dishes include the highly sought-after Udang Galah (King Prawn) in Temburong, the steamed rice dish Wajid Temburong (wrapped in phacelophrynium (Nyirik) leaves and served with sugar and coconut milk), and the refreshingly sweet and green Cendol Temburong, a dessert composed of rice grains. Government resthouses, executive houses, chalets, and homestays are among the lodging choices in Temburong. Bangar Town shopping offers a variety of retail establishments as well as the Bumiputera Main Complex, which has souvenir shops, food stores, handicrafts, and more. For a sample of the local cuisine, visit Tamu Muhibah Aneka Selera Pekan Bangar, a dry market across from the Youth Center in Bangar Town.

=== Landmarks ===
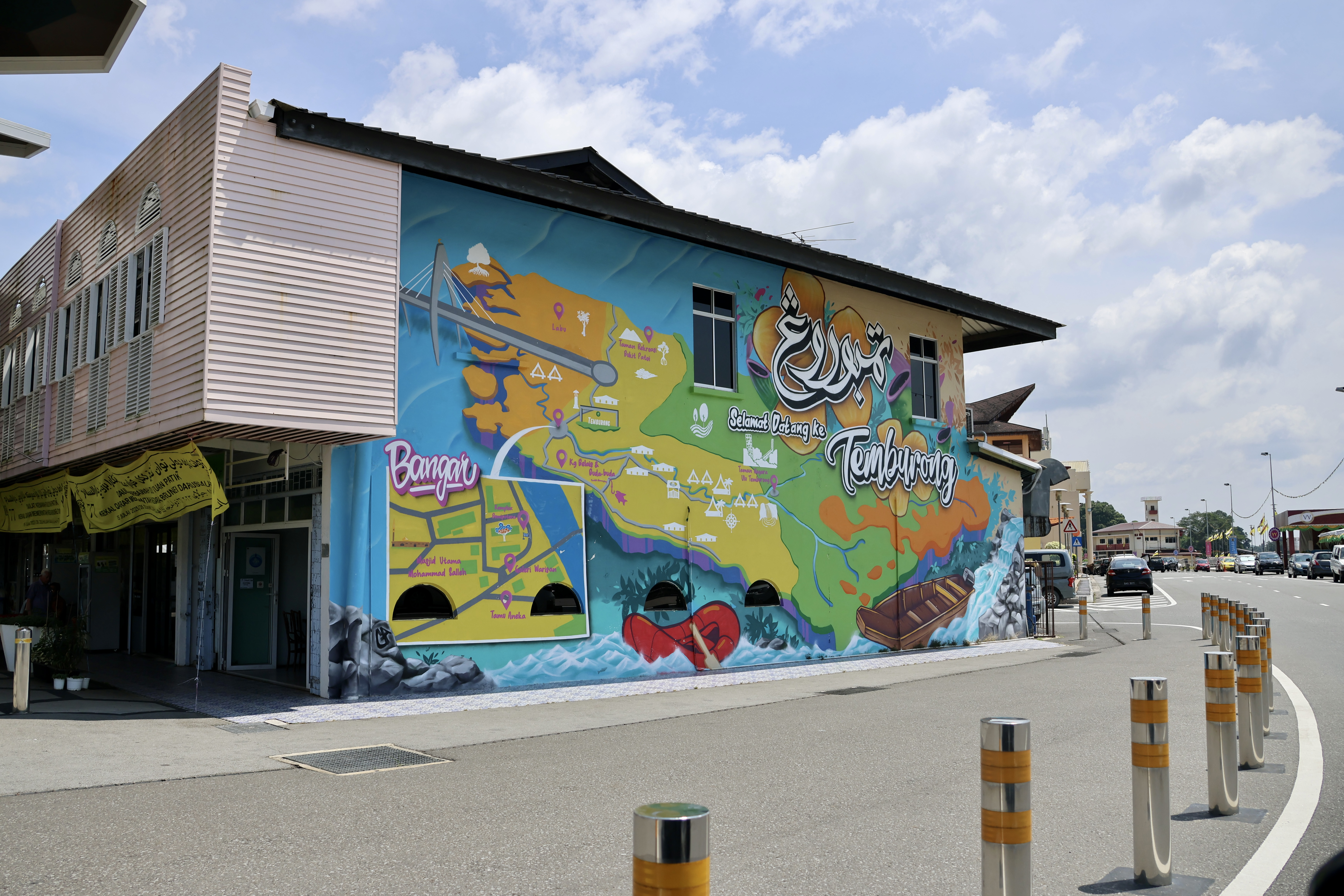
Mural in Bangar Town

The Temburong District has several local points of interest. Kampong Labu Estate, a former rubber plantation, preserves historical rubber processing equipment. Taman Aie Tenub, named after the creek that runs through it (meaning "cold water park" in a combination of Malay, Iban, and Murut), serves as a public recreation area. It is situated in Kampong Selapon. Reachable by driving in 10 to 20 minutes, the Temburong Longhouses in southern Temburong document the residential structure of the Iban ethnic group, with many residences under one roof and a Head of the House known as a "Tuai Rumah." In Kampong Senukoh, Wasai Deraya Rimba and Wasai Deraya Belukar offer swimming areas with miniature waterfalls, while Arca Taman Gemilang 60 honours Sultan Hassanal Bolkiah's 60th birthday.

=== Recreation ===
Temburong District's virgin tropical rainforests are a location for ecotourism. With a canopy walkway rising to a height of 250 meters, Ulu Temburong National Park, which covers an area of more than 500 square kilometres, offers panoramic view of one of the oldest rainforests. A little mangrove island to the north called Selirong Island, with its bright tropical ecology and morning mist, provides a magical experience. Situated in the eastern region of Temburong, Bukit Patoi Recreational Park boasts a 300-meter wooden walk that ascends to a 310-meter hill that offers views across the Lawas Basin. 13 kilometres from Bangar Town, Batang Duri Recreational Park has a mini-zoo with native animals and river wading.

== Awards ==
In 2009, Temburong District was recognised for the first Excellent Village medal, where the Village Consultative Council (MPK) of Belais and Buda-Buda won a bronze medal for their efforts related to fishing, heritage and recreational parks, farming of chicken, mushroom cultivation, and food production. The MPK Sibut was also given a certificate of appreciation.
