= Limbang Division =

Division of Sarawak, Malaysia

Limbang
- Divisions of Sarawak

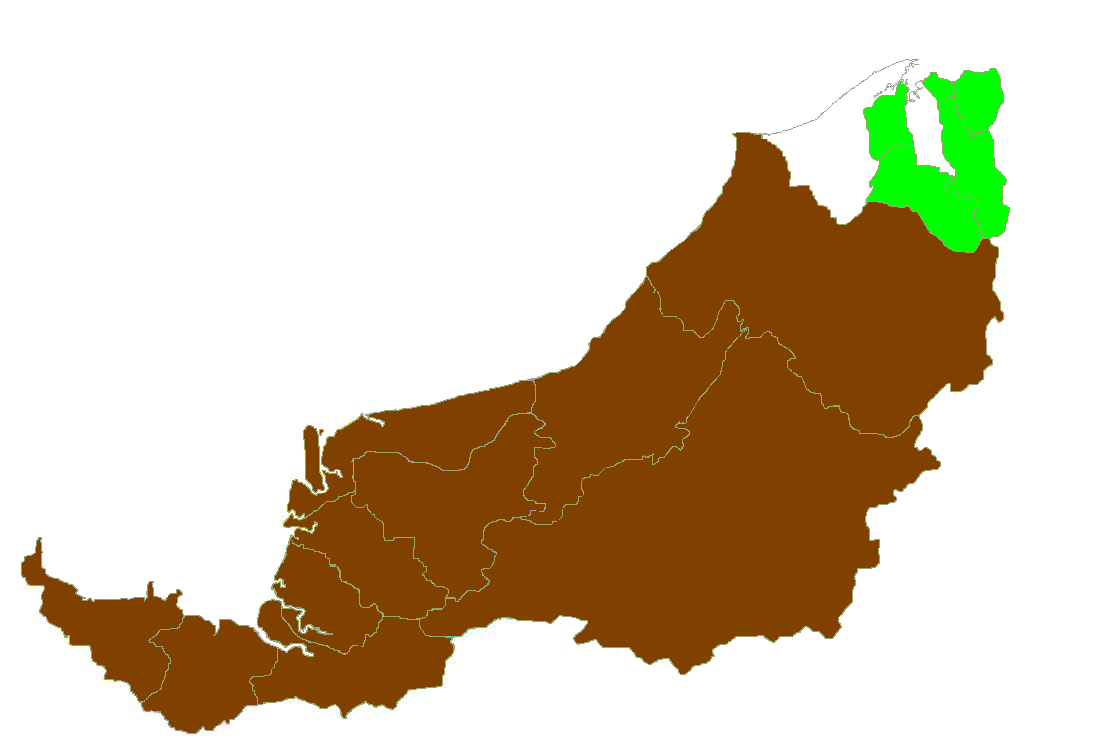
- Division Office location: Limbang
- Local area government(s): Majlis Daerah Limbang (MDLimbang); Majlis Daerah Lawas (MDLawas)

Area
  - Total: 7,788.5 km^{2} (3,007.2 sq mi)

Population (2020)
  - Total: 137,190
  - Density: 17.614/km^{2} (45.621/sq mi)
- Resident: Haji Sebi Bin Haji Abang
- Ethnicity: Orang Ulu (38.2%), Malay (28.5%), Iban (16.3%), Chinese (11.0%), Others (5.5%)

Limbang Division (Malay: Bahagian Limbang) is one of the twelve administrative divisions of Sarawak, Malaysia. It has a total area of 7,788.50 square kilometres, and is the fourth largest division after Kapit Division, Miri Division and Bintulu Division. Limbang Division consists of two districts which are Limbang District and Lawas District, which in turn are divided as sub-districts in Limbang (Nanga Medamit Sub-District) and two sub-districts in Lawas (Sundar Sub-District and Trusan Sub-District). Long Semadoh and Ba’kelalan are rural settlements in the southern part of Lawas district. Two major towns in Limbang are Limbang and Lawas. There are also few smaller towns such as Sundar, Trusan, Merapok and Tedungan.

== Geography ==
Limbang Division splits Brunei Darussalam into two; West Brunei to the west and Temburong District in the middle of Limbang and Lawas districts. Limbang is located between West Brunei and Temburong, while Lawas is located between Temburong and the Malaysian state of Sabah. This geographical situation, as well as the autonomy of Sabah and Sarawak in immigration affairs means that immigration checks are required when travelling into or out of Limbang Division by road.

== Demography ==
As of 2002, the population of Limbang Division was 81,152. This makes Limbang one of the most sparsely populated divisions in Sarawak with only 10.5 people per square kilometre. Most of the Limbang Division population is concentrated in the coastal areas of Limbang and Lawas.

=== Ethnics ===
Limbang is traditionally a home to Bisaya, Malay, Kedayan, Kelabit, Iban, Murut/Lun Bawang, Chinese and Orang Ulu people. Other Sarawakian ethnic groups do exist, especially Bidayuh and Melanau, who migrate from various parts of Sarawak. It has one of the highest concentration of Orang Ulu and Kedayan people. Due to being so close to Brunei, the Malay dialect in Limbang Division is somehow distinct to other parts of Sarawak. It has more Kedayan, Brunei Malay and Sabah regional dialect influences to it.

Population of Limbang by Ethnics
Administrative District	Total Population	Malay^{1}	Iban	Bidayuh	Melanau	Other Bumiputera^{2}	Chinese	Other Non-Bumiputera	Non-Citizen
Limbang	47,000 (54.3%)	11,700 (24.9%)	13,000 (27.7%)	300 (0.6%)	300 (0.6%)	14,000 (29.8%)	6,400 (13.6%)	200 (0.1%)	1,100 (2.3%)
Lawas	39,600 (45.7%)	13,000 (32.8%)	1,100 (2.8%)	200 (0.5%)	200 (0.5%)	19,100 (48.2%)	3,100 (7.8%)	600 (1.5%)	2,600 (6.6%)
Total Limbang Division	86,600 (100%)	24,700 (28.5%)	14,100 (16.3%)	500 (0.6%)	500 (0.6%)	33,100 (38.2%)	9,500 (11.0%)	800 (0.9%)	3,700 (4.3%)

Note:
^{1} Excluding Kedayan.
^{2} Including Kedayan and Orang Ulu ethnics such as Lun Bawang, Murut, Kelabit and Penan.

=== Members of Parliament ===
Parliament	Member of Parliament	Party
P221 Limbang	YB Datuk Hasbi Habibollah	GPS (PBB)
P222 Lawas	YB Dato Henry Sum Agong	GPS (PBB)

== Economy ==
Limbang mostly relies on its agriculture, timber industry and tourism sector to keep growing. Commercial sector is thriving in Limbang because of its location is within Brunei vicinity. Limbang has one of the highest number of tourist in Sarawak whereby Bruneian and Sabahan as the main contributor.

Main commercial areas in Limbang are:

- Limbang
- Lawas
- Tedungan

== Transportation ==
=== Road ===
Owing to its geographical location, Limbang is completely cut off from the rest of Sarawak's road network. It is however has good road links to both parts of Brunei located to the east and west of the district. There is also a good local network of roads in the district.

There are two road border crossing checkpoints in Limbang district, both into Brunei.

- Tedungan: Located 43 km west of Limbang, it is the road crossing into the main part of Brunei from Limbang. The Brunei checkpoint is called Kuala Lurah.
- Pandaruan: This checkpoint is located 15 km east of Limbang on the Pandaruan River which forms the border between Sarawak and Brunei's Temburong district. The crossing used to be done by ferry. Recently, a bridge has been built over the Pandaruan River and thus reduces the queuing time between the two checkpoints. The checkpoint on the Brunei side is called Puni and operates out of a wooden building located 500m from the ferry landing point.

Lawas, however, by virtue of its geographical location, is also cut off from the rest of Sarawak's road network. It is however linked by main road to Sabah and Brunei's Temburong district. There is a good local road network around Lawas district which is relatively free of traffic jams.

Two road border crossings are located in Lawas district.

- Mengkalap: Located to the west of Lawas town is the Mengkalap border checkpoint for traffic headed to or from Brunei. The new immigration complex at the border has been completed recently. Previously it was operating temporarily from a shoplot in Trusan Bazaar, 8 km from the actual Brunei-Malaysia border. The name of the Brunei checkpoint is Labu in Temburong district located at the border.
- Merapok: To the east of Lawas town, this checkpoint is for traffic headed to or from Sabah (Sarawak, despite being a Malaysian state, has autonomy over immigration matters). The Sabah checkpoint across the state border is Sindumin.

Here are images of passport stamps from the ICQS checkpoints located in Limbang Division.

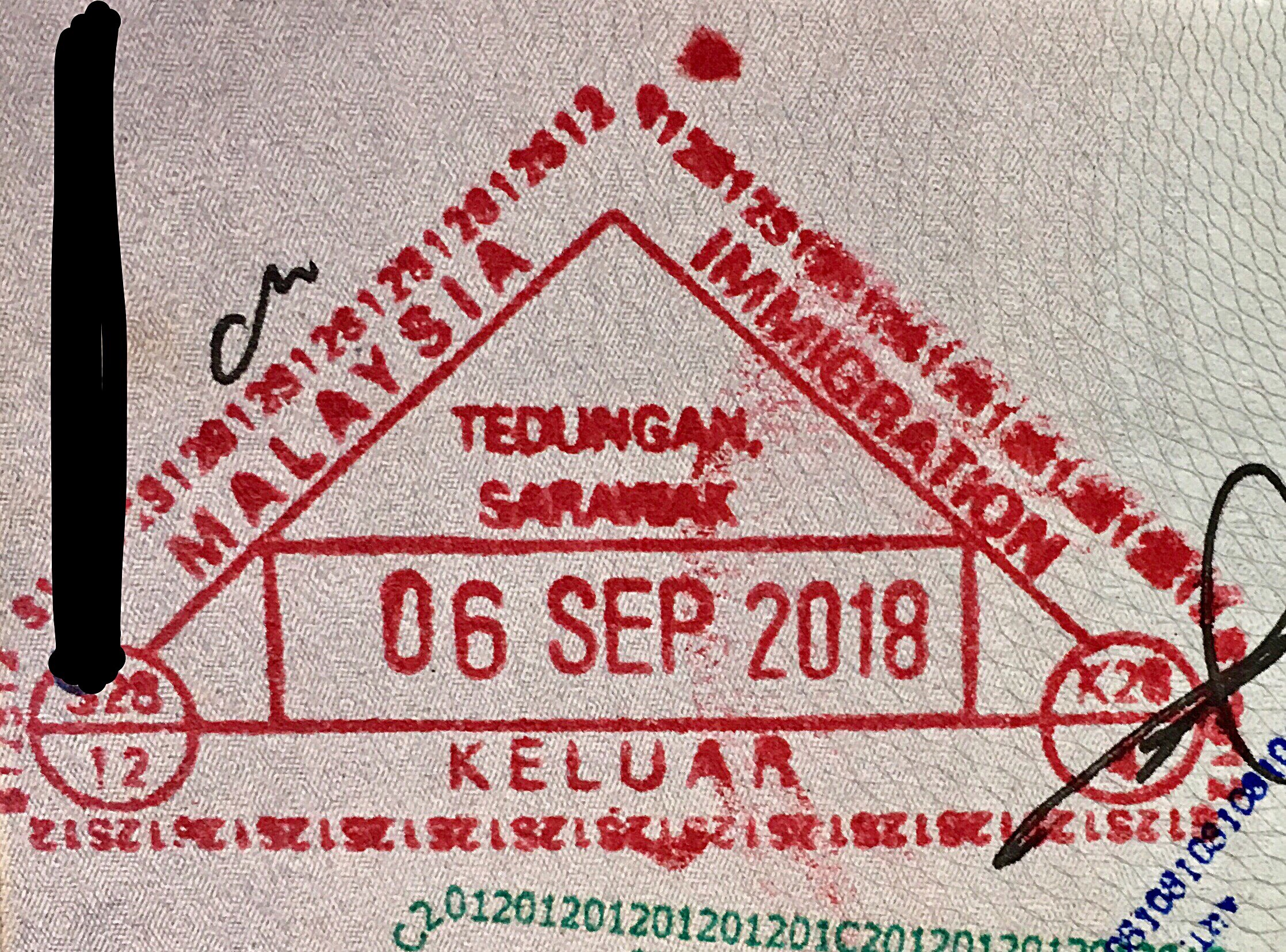
Malaysian passport exit stamp from Tedungan ICQS Checkpoint.

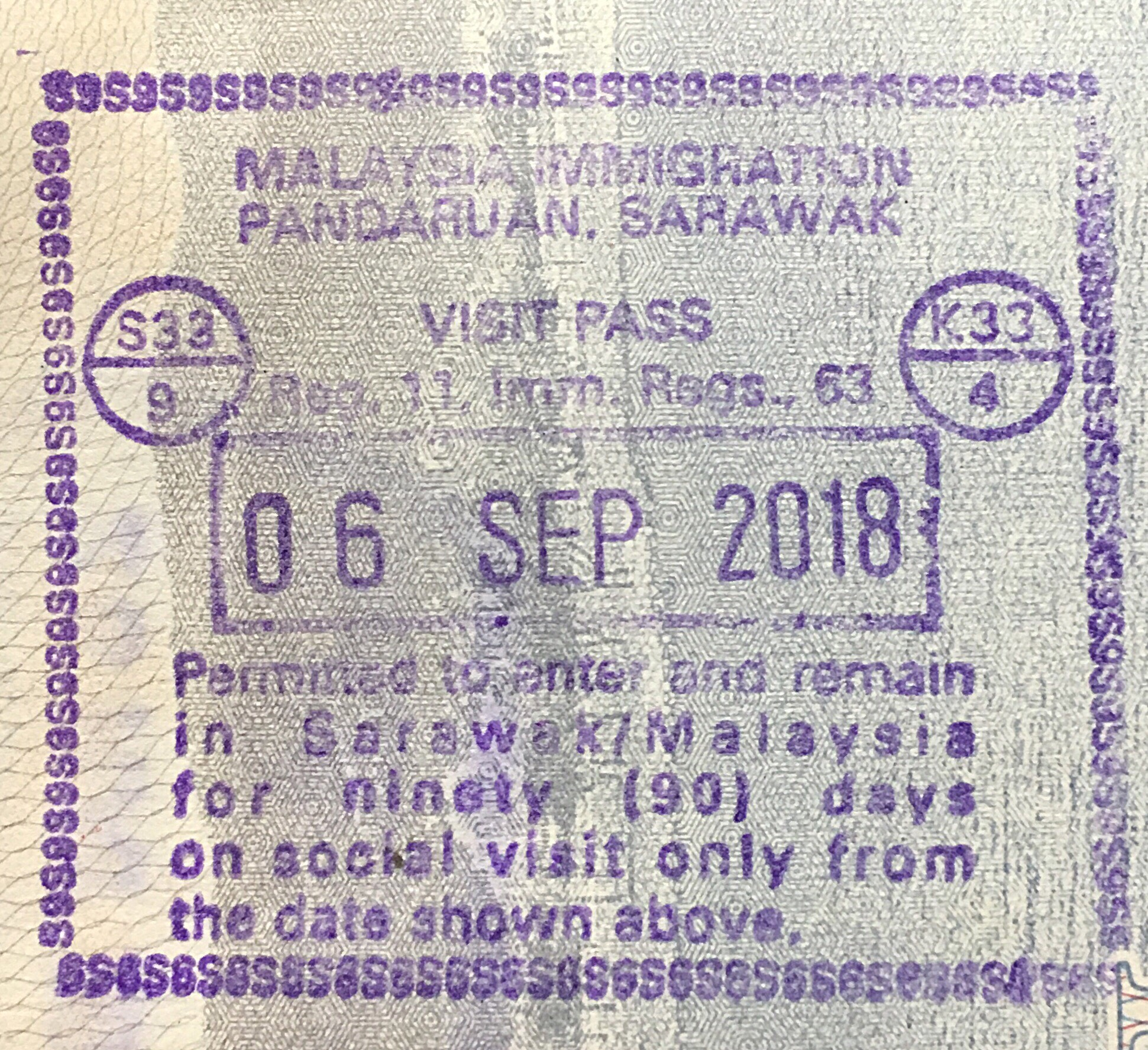
Entry stamp from Pandaruan ICQS Checkpoint.

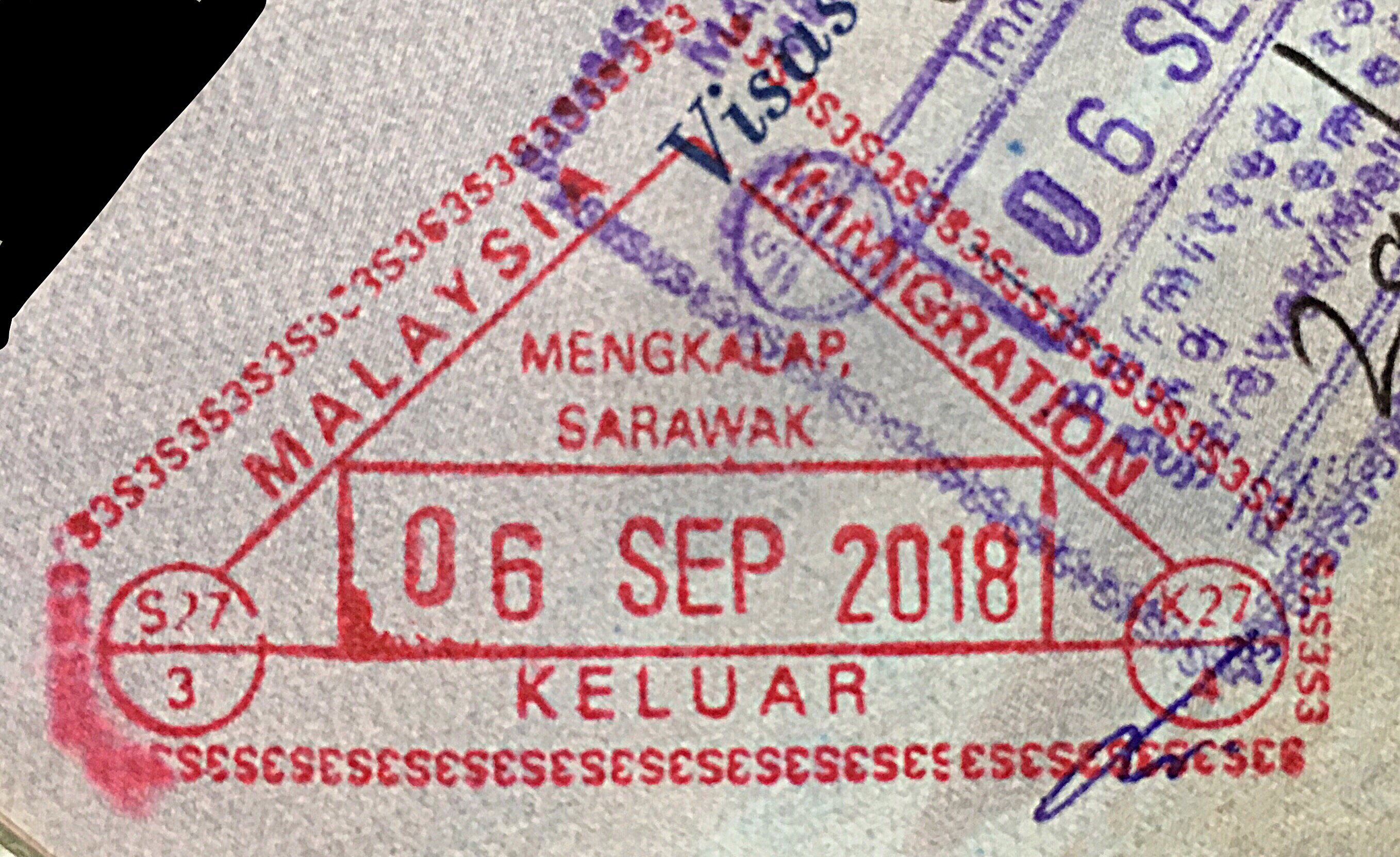
Exit stamp from Mengkalap ICQS Checkpoint.

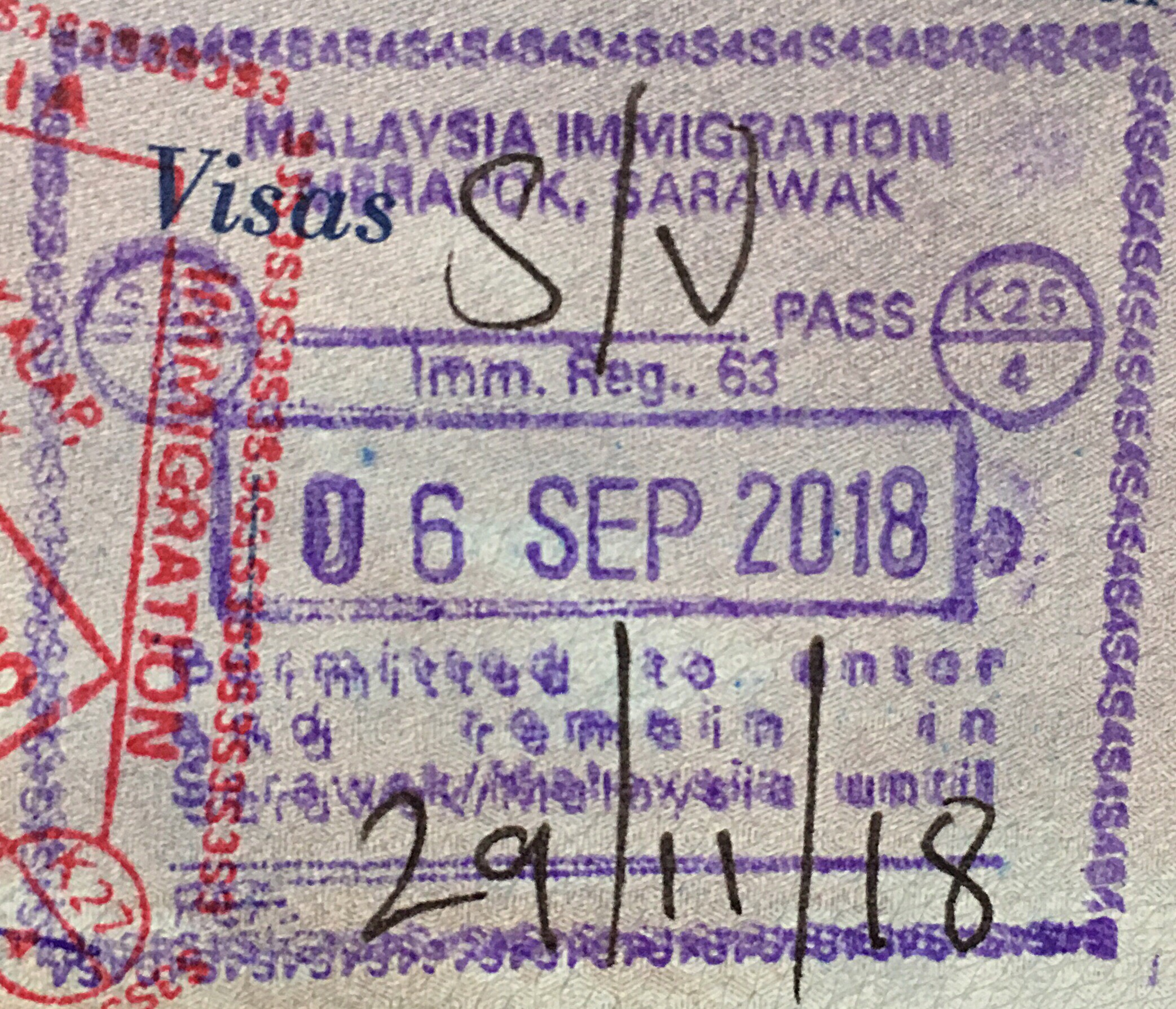
Entry stamp from Merapok ICQS Checkpoint.

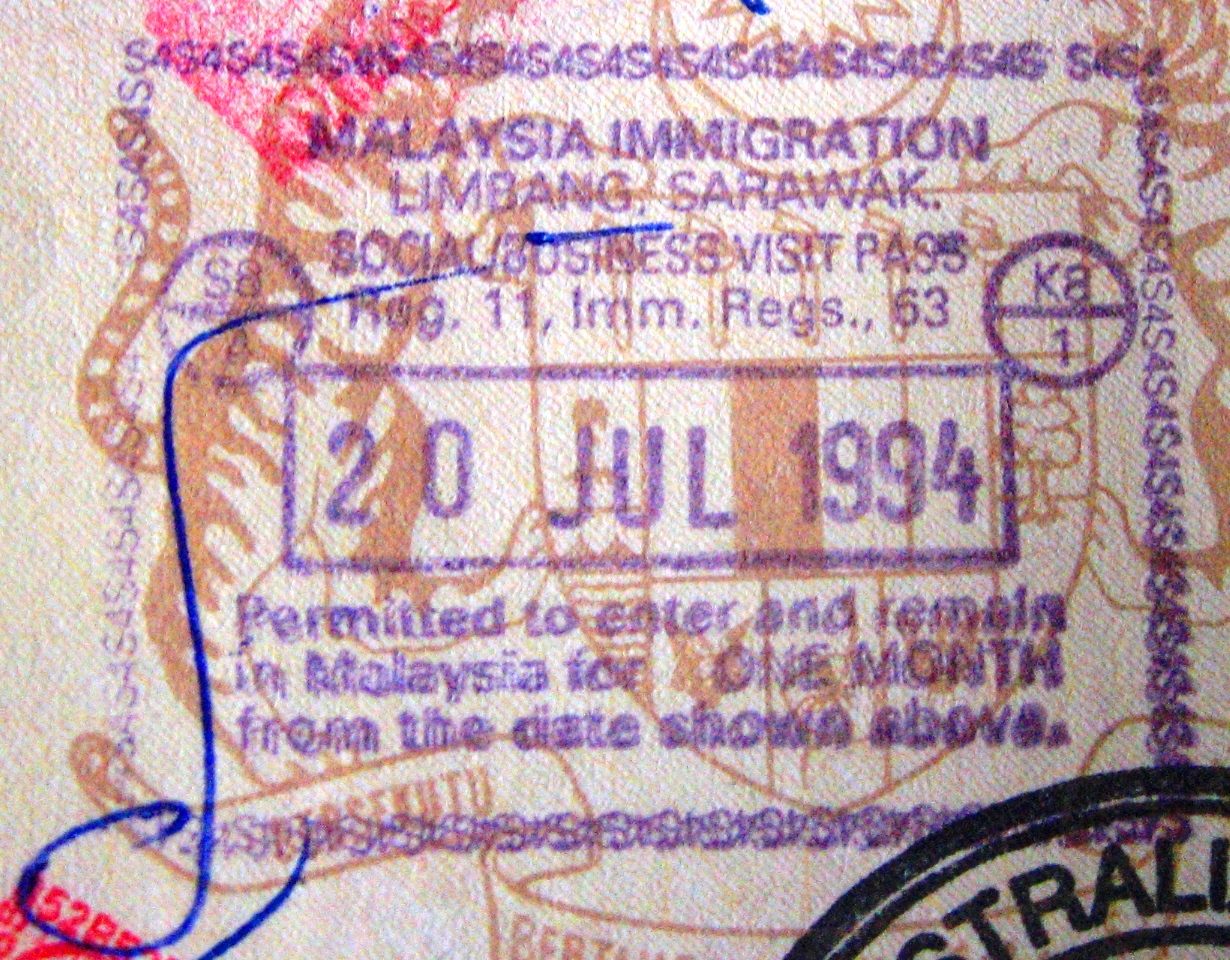
Entry stamp from the Limbang Wharf ICQS Checkpoint, for boat arrivals from Brunei and Labuan.

Although Limbang is well connected to other parts of Sarawak with good networks of road through Brunei, river transports still play the vital role in Limbang. People of Limbang Division can opt for rural shuttle bus service to Ng. Medamit and Tedungan from Limbang town, and also Sundar and Trusan from Lawas town.

There are some rural areas which are accessible by timber tracks and palm estate roads such as Long Tengom, Long Sukang, Merarap, Long Semado, Rutoh and Ba'Kelalan. Availability of transports to these areas are limited through bookings at Limbang and Lawas town, using private vans or four-wheel drive vehicles.

=== Air ===
There are existing small airports that served the division through MASwings namely Limbang Airport in Limbang to Kota Kinabalu, Kuching, Lawas and Miri.

== Infrastructure ==
=== Education ===
Limbang Division has a moderate number of public schools. There are numbers of secondary school for both districts of Limbang and Lawas. As for primary schools, most of them are scattered throughout Limbang. Some of them are located deep in the Limbang Division's interior to cater for rural students. There is one Islamic secondary school which is SMKA Limbang.

There is no public or private higher institution in Limbang Division.

=== Healthcare ===
Limbang Division has two government hospital which are Limbang Hospital (located 500m from the Limbang town) and Lawas Hospital. As for Ng. Medamit, Sundar and Trusan sub-district, all has their own health clinic. Smaller government health clinics do exist at various communal areas such as Ba'Kelalan.

=== Security ===
Limbang Division has two police district offices, namely at Limbang and Lawas. There are also police stations and police bits located at strategic locations, as well as rural areas. Despite being the fourth largest division, Limbang Division so far has no district military bases. Only small military camps do exist just to make presence.

=== Government services ===
Other government offices have set up their branches in both Limbang and Lawas districts (some at Ng. Medamit, Sundar and Trusan sub-districts and other smaller communal areas) such as Royal Customs, Fire and Rescue Department, Education Department, etc.

== See also ==
- Sarawak
- Limbang Town
- Limbang District
- Lawas Town
- Lawas District
