= Old Fort (Limbang) =

Fort in Sarawak, Malaysia

Coordinates: 4°44′50″N 115°00′13″E

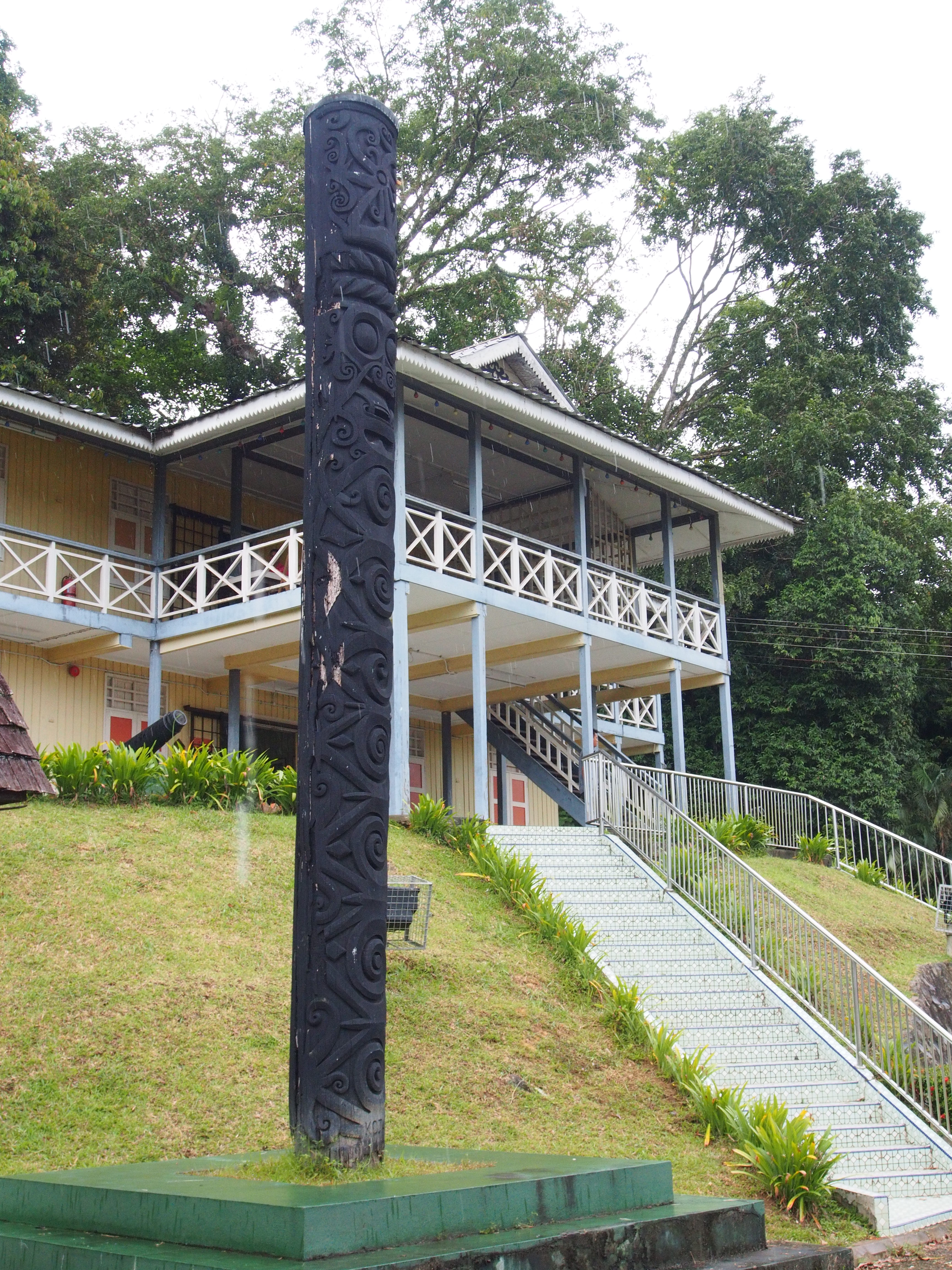
- Interactive map of the Old Fort area

General information
- Location: Limbang, Sarawak, Malaysia
- Completed: Constructed in 1897 and rebuilt in 1989
- Owner: Government of Sarawak

Technical details
- Floor count: 2

The Old Fort is a historical fort situated in Limbang, Sarawak, Malaysia. It was built in 1897 by Charles Brooke, the second Rajah of Sarawak, to safeguard government activities in the area, and now serves as a museum.

== History ==
The fort, strategically located on a hill overlooking the Limbang River in the town of Limbang in northern Sarawak, was built in 1897 by Charles Brooke, the second Rajah of Sarawak, as a government administrative centre and to house the Resident. Constructed using Belian timber, it also served as a jail and storage depot.

In September 1989, the fort was destroyed by fire and reconstructed at the same location as an exact replica of the original fort. On completion, the fort was converted into a museum.

== Limbang Regional Museum ==
Known as Limbang Regional Museum, it was opened on 27 August 1994 by Adenan bin Haji Satem, Minister of Social Development. Its collection includes archaeological and ethnic artefacts from the area, including tools for craft making and traditional clothing.

Maintained by the Sarawak Museum Department, in 1985 the building was gazetted as a cultural heritage site under the Sarawak Cultural Heritage Ordinance.
