= Limbang District =

District in Sarawak, Malaysia

- District
- District of Sarawak

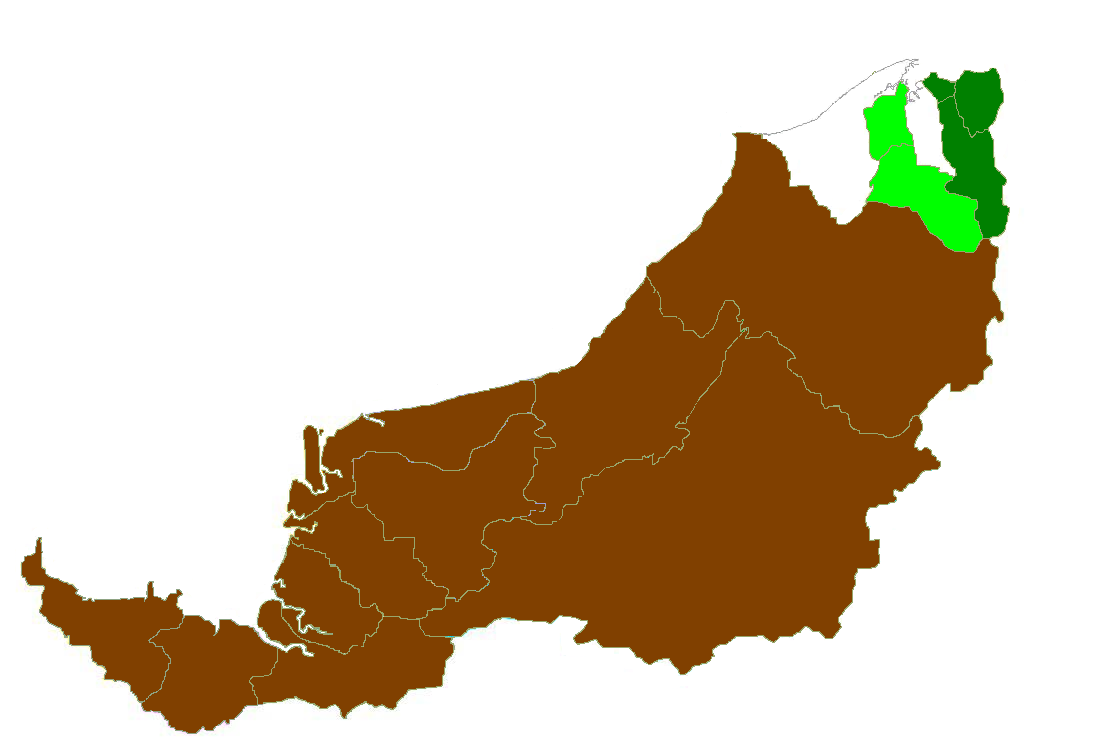
- Country: Malaysia
- State: Sarawak
- Division: Limbang Division
- District Office location: Limbang
- Local area government(s): Majlis Daerah Limbang

Area
  - Total: 3,978.10 km^{2} (1,535.95 sq mi)

Population (2020)
  - Total: 90,990
  - Density: 22.87/km^{2} (59.24/sq mi)
- District Officer: Anyi Ngau
- Ethnicity: Bruneian Malay and Kedayan (30.3%), Iban (24.7%), Chinese (21.3%), Others (23.7%)
- Historical claimed by: Brunei
- Website: https://limbangdc.sarawak.gov.my/

Map of Limbang District

The Limbang District is one of the two districts of Limbang Division, Malaysia. It has a total area of 3,978.10 square kilometres. The major town is Limbang. It has one sub-district, which is Nanga Medamit Sub-District. It bisects the sovereign state of Brunei Darussalam to the west and east, and borders the Malaysia Lawas District to the southeast and Miri District to the south and southwest. Due to being squeezed in between Brunei at its north and coastal areas, Limbang is accessible by road only through cross-border immigration posts.

== History ==
The area was annexed from Brunei in 1890 by Charles Anthoni Johnson Brooke, the second White Rajah of Sarawak, to become his realm's fifth division. The annexation was strongly disputed by Brunei.

The de facto boundary ran along the watershed between the Brunei River and Limbang River basins on the western side of the district, and along the length of the Pandaruan River on the eastern side. Boundary agreements have delineated a stretch of the western border and the Pandaruan River while the other stretches have yet to be delineated.

Despite its annexation to Sarawak, Limbang has been officially claimed since 1967 by Brunei as part of its integral territory. It is the main issue of the Brunei–Malaysia border disputes since Limbang separates Brunei territorially into two parts.

== Demography ==
The population of Limbang district (year 2024) was 69,990.

=== Ethnicity ===
Limbang is traditionally a home to Bruneian Malay, Kedayan, Chinese, Iban, Lun Bawang and Orang Ulu people.

Limbang is the most culturally diverse and distinct part of Sarawak. It is a melting pot of many cultures, including Malay, Kedayan, Chinese, Iban and various Orang Ulu ethnic groups such as Lun Bawang, Bisaya, Murut, Kelabit and Penan. It has one of the highest concentration of Orang Ulu people in Sarawak.

Population of Limbang by Ethnicity
Administrative District	Total Population	Bruneian Malay^{1}	Iban	Bidayuh	Melanau	Other Bumiputera^{2}	Chinese	Other Non-Bumiputera	Non-Citizen
Limbang	47,000 (100%)	11,700 (24.9%)	13,000 (27.7%)	300 (0.6%)	300 (0.6%)	14,000 (29.8%)	6,400 (13.6%)	200 (0.1%)	1,100 (2.3%)

Note:
^{1} Excluding Kedayan.
^{2} Including Kedayan and other Orang Ulu such as Lun Bawang, Kelabit, Penan, Murut etc.

== Economy ==
The economy is largely based on the timber and agricultural industries. Timber industry remains a strong component of the district's economy. Agriculture is relatively minor although growing steadily, with oil palm, rattan and pepper the main products.

== Transportation ==
=== Road ===
Owing to its geographical location, Limbang is completely cut off from the rest of Sarawak's road network. It is however has good road links to both parts of Brunei located to the east and west of the district. There is also a good local network of roads in the district.

There are two road border crossing checkpoints in Limbang district, both into Brunei.

- Pandaruan: This checkpoint is located 15 km east of Limbang on the Pandaruan River which forms the border between Sarawak and Brunei's Temburong District. The checkpoint on the Brunei side is called Puni.
- Tedungan: Located 43 km west of Limbang, it is the road crossing into the main part of Brunei from Limbang. The Brunei checkpoint is called Kuala Lurah.
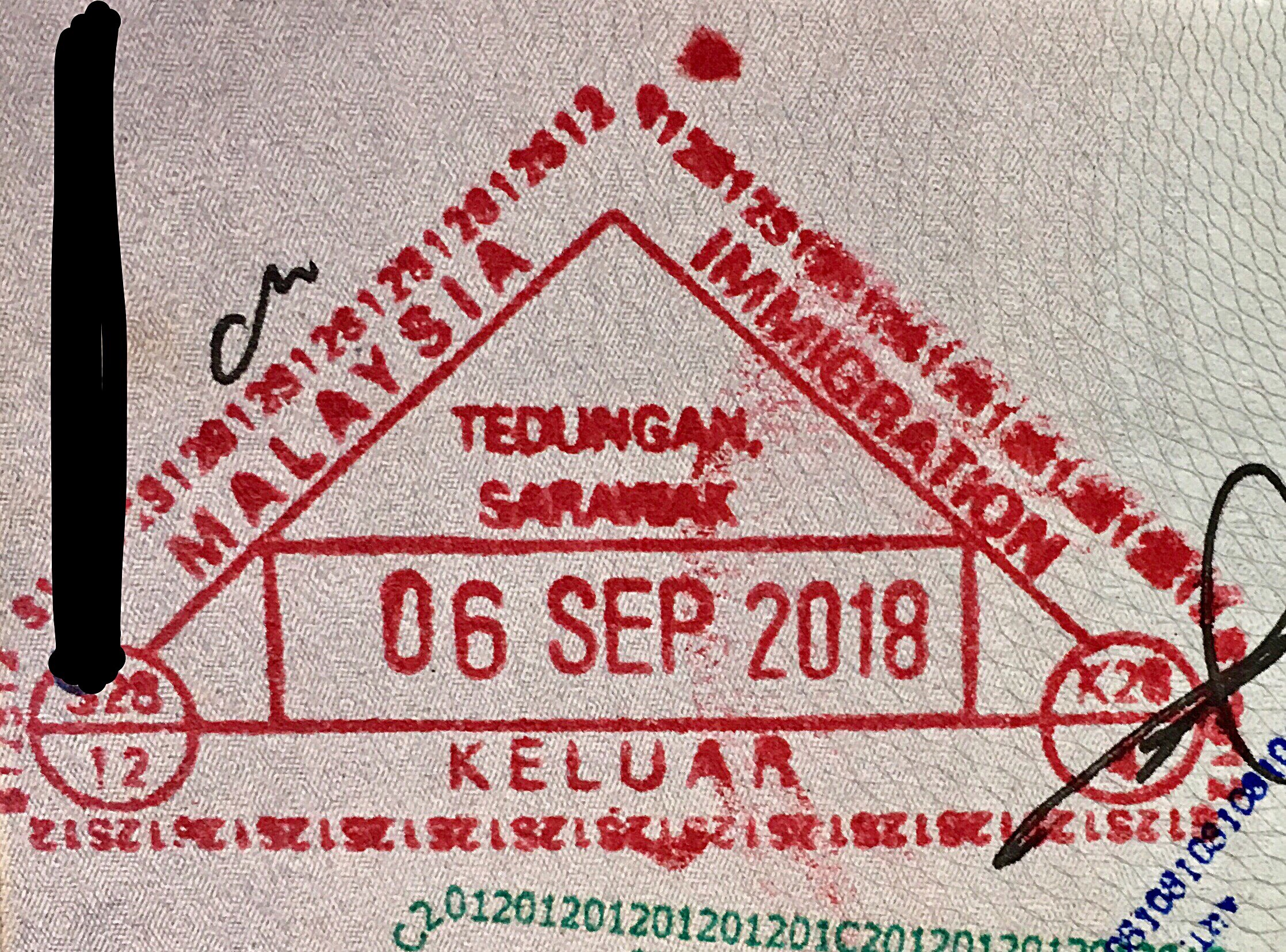
Malaysian passport exit stamp from Tedungan ICQS Checkpoint.

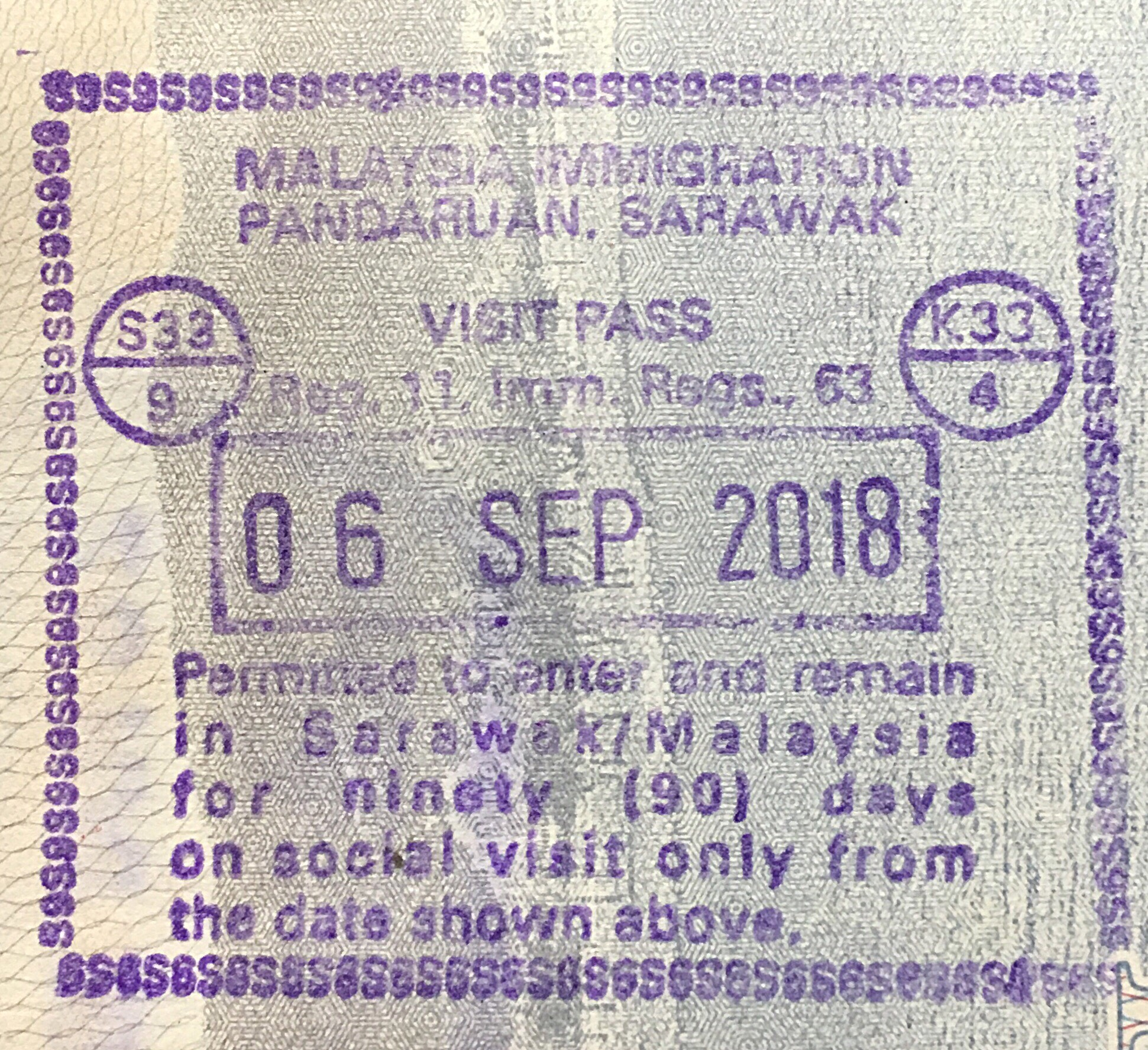
Entry stamp from Pandaruan ICQS Checkpoint.

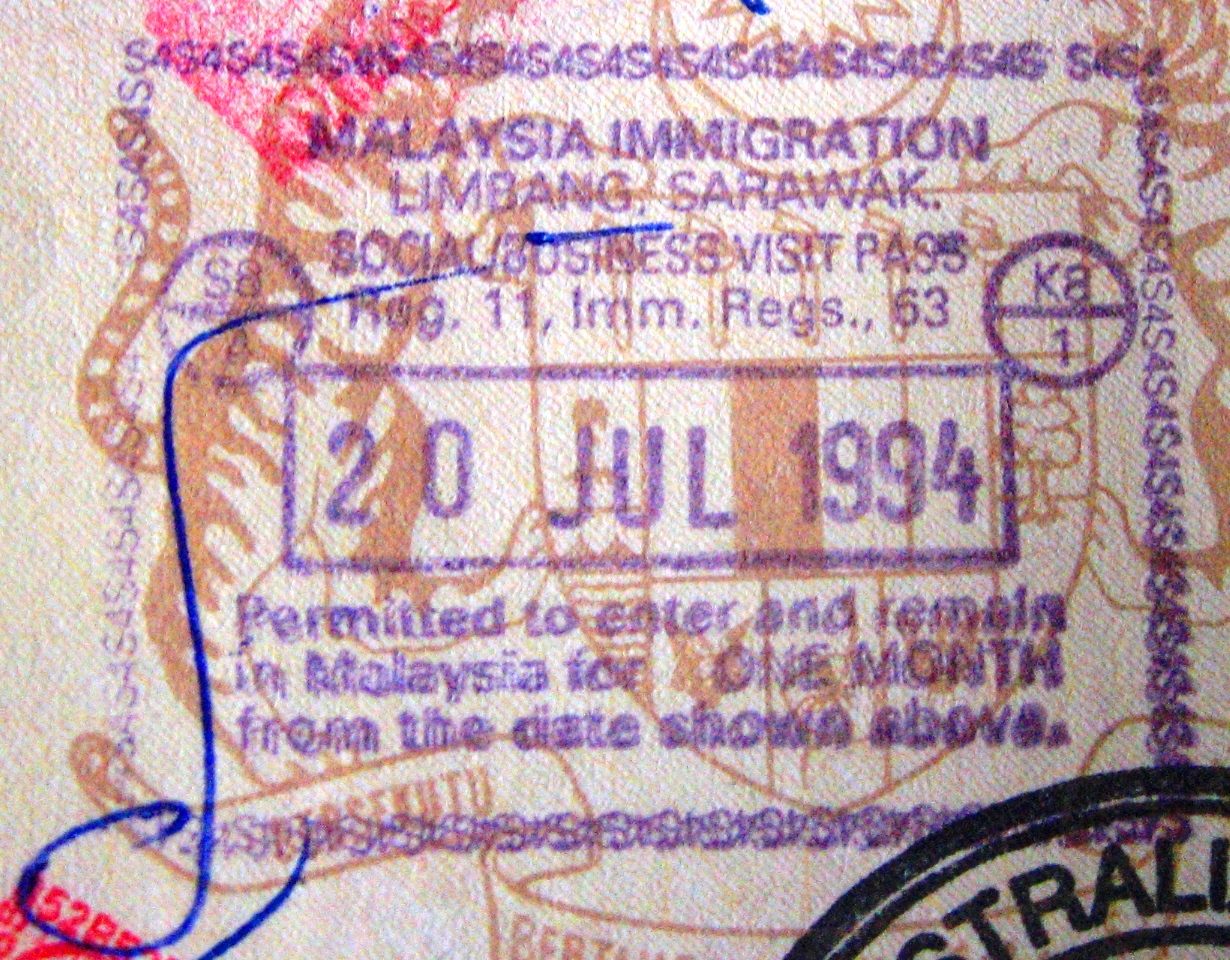
Entry stamp from the Limbang Wharf ICQS Checkpoint, for boat arrivals from Brunei and Labuan.

=== Air ===
There are existing small airports that served the division through MASwings namely Limbang Airport in Limbang to Kota Kinabalu, Kuching, Lawas and Miri.

== Infrastructure ==
=== Education ===
Limbang District has five secondary schools: SMK Limbang, SMKA Limbang, SMK Medamit, SMK Seri Patiambun Limbang and SMK Kubong. It has numerous primary schools, mostly scattered around Limbang rural areas.

=== Healthcare ===
Limbang has its own hospital which is Hospital Limbang. However, as for surgeries and more critical cases, they are normally referred to Miri Hospital, or to greater extent, Sarawak General Hospital in Kuching.

=== Security ===
Limbang District has a police district office. There are also police stations and police bits located at strategic locations, as well as rural areas. Despite being the fourth largest division, Limbang Division so far has no district military bases. This is also true for Limbang District. Only small military camps do exist just to make presence at Limbang district.

=== Government services ===
Other government offices have set up their branches in Limbang Districts such as Royal Customs, Fire and Rescue Department, Education Department etc.

== See also ==
- Lawas District
- Limbang Division
- Limbang Town
- Sarawak
