= Pandaruan River =

River in Sarawak, Malaysia

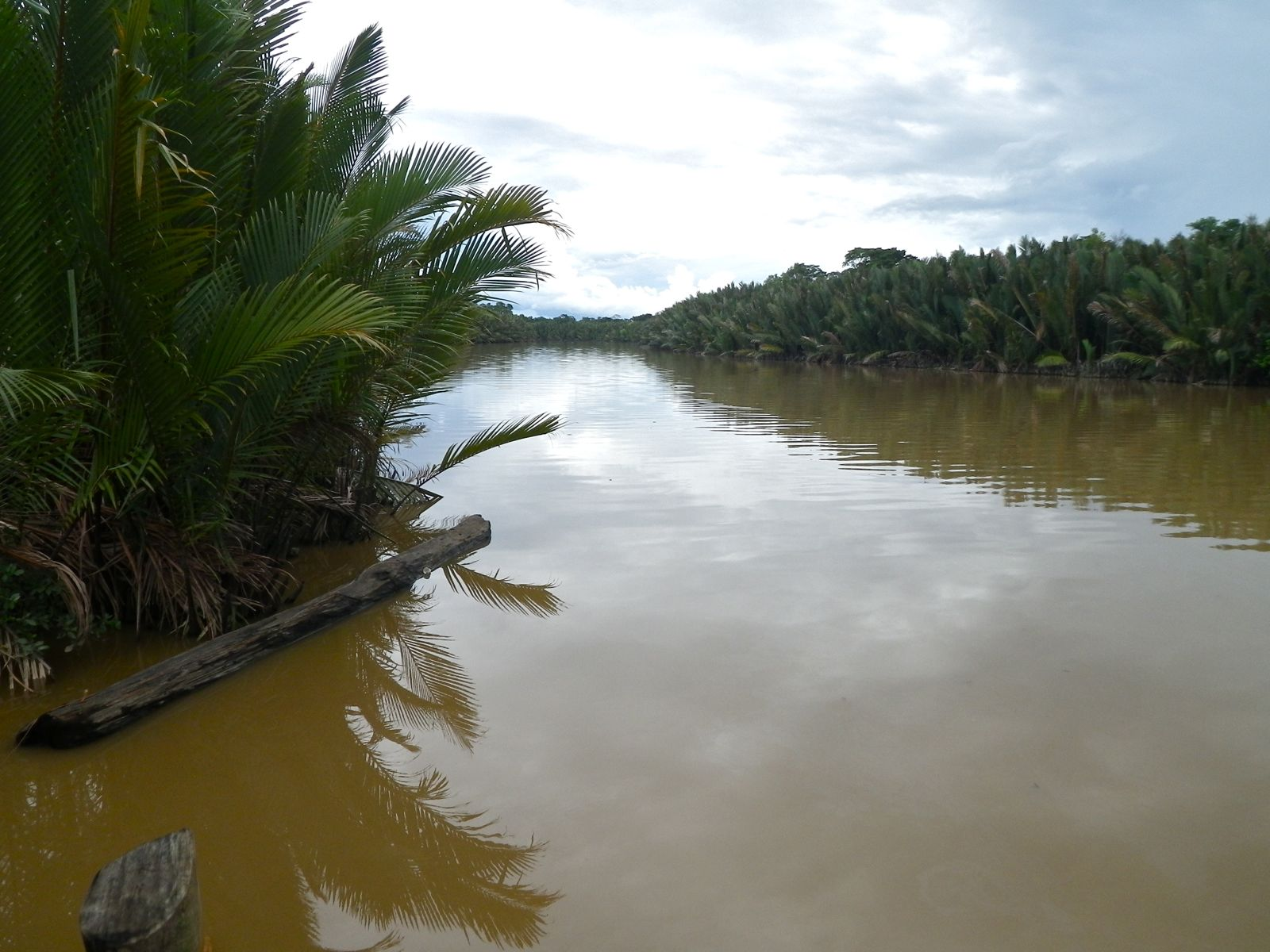
- Pandaruan River seen from Limbang
- Native name: Sungai Pandaruan

Location
- Country: Brunei; Malaysia
- District/State: Brunei: Temburong; Malaysia: Limbang

Physical characteristics
- Mouth
  - location: South China Sea
  - coordinates: 4°49′N 115°02′E
  - elevation: 0 m (0 ft)

Pandaruan River (Malay: Sungai Pandaruan) is a part of the boundary between Brunei and Malaysia's Limbang District in Sarawak, is a significant waterway in the Temburong District. As one of Temburong District's four major river systems, it contributes to an estuarine landscape characterised by mangrove ecosystems. Historically, the river has served as a strategic border zone, a wartime route, and a corridor of connection between Brunei and Sarawak, shaping both colonial and modern developments along its course.

== Geography ==
Pandaruan River is a tributary of four large river systems of Temburong District flowing into one another at approximately the estuary near Pulau Siarau, and it contributes to the hydrological network and ecological importance of the region, which covers several protected conservation areas. The river flows southwest for about 30 miles from the mouth of the river, located 0.4 miles west of the northern tip of Pulau Siarau and 2.3 miles southeast of Tanjong Tubu-Tubu.

In its mouth, Kampong Rangau holds the west bank with a shallow boat channel connecting the Pandaruan to the Limbang River. Mangrove swamps on the east bank of the estuary are crossed by small, unobtrusive rivers. The river is navigable for small boats of up to 1.2 metres (approximately 4 feet) draft for some 9 miles upstream, but a shallow bar off the mouth restricts larger vessels. Fisirable depths of about 2.7 metres extend from Tanjong Tubu-Tubu to the southern extremity of Pulau Siarau, decreasing to about 2 metres upstream as far as Bukit Terumi, which is joined by road with Limbang. The narrow entrance between Tanjong Selirong and the Limbang River bar is the access to the Pandaruan and Temburong rivers. This channel, marked by navigation beacons, has fairway depths of about 8 fathoms. There is a distinctive black and white checkered conical lighted buoy moored on the channel's western side about 8½ miles southwest of Tanjong Selirong. The channel slopes steeply on its western side and shoals gradually on the eastern side, guiding vessels safely into the river system.

== History ==
The Pandaruan River, marking the boundary between Brunei and Sarawak's Limbang District, has been a disputed, strategic river in regional development, conflict, and governance. There was jurisdictional dispute between Brunei and the Raj of Sarawak in 1912 over management and revenue of the river district. British Resident in Brunei, Harvey Chevallier clarified that Sir Charles Brooke, as an individual and not in his official capacity as representative of the Sarawak government, had tulin (ownership) in the Pandaruan District but not sovereign rights. Brunei exercised its sovereign rights by levying a head tax and had intended to station a customs officer at Ranau to supervise trade and enforce compliance.

By 1933, entry to the Temburong town of Bangar, previously limited to river travel, had been improved with the construction of a 3-mile road linking it to the Pandaruan River. Concerns about the construction of a ferry crossing further enhanced accessibility, with automobile access to Bangar for the first time from Sarawak.

During World War II, the Pandaruan River was a Borneo campaign strategic line. On 16 June 1945, Australian troops of the 2/15th Battalion advanced upriver and occupied Limbang without opposition, as the Japanese had preceded them in withdrawal. Australians employed Limbang as a new southern base. Dayak informants among the local population guided Australian forces to the final Japanese positions. More skirmishes resulted in a final decisive battle on 7 July, when about 20 Japanese troops, including their battalion commander, were killed, effectively ending organised resistance in the area.

In the 1962 Brunei revolt, again, the river was a primary route of escape and patrol. Security forces followed movement upriver to apprehendrebels fleeing from Brunei. Between the 17 and 18 December period, surrenders were made on several occasions, one of them surrendering to a helicopter patrol. Over 100 detainees, including suspected leaders of North Kalimantan National Army, eventually were held in Limbang. They included Salleh Sambas, a rebel leader, who entered Sarawak by crossing the Pandaruan River at night and concealed himself along with his brother. Later, military patrols forced him to shift from where he initially concealed himself.

== Transportations and crossings ==
The Pandaruan Bridge was amongst the biggest outcomes from bilateral talks between Malaysia and Brunei. Previously, a ferry linkacross the Pandaruan River was the sole connection, which resulted in daily logistical issues for commuters, particularly those attempting to travel between different districts of Brunei or reach the Pan-Borneo Highway. The bridge was part of a broader set of bilateral agreements toward enhancing connectivity and economic linkages in the BIMP-EAGA sub-region. Tenders were invited in December 2011, and the construction was to start in April 2012 and last for a year. The project consisted of constructing a five-span bridge with approach ramps and link roads, and was expected to support trade and transportation.

== Flora and fauna ==
Mangrove vegetation along the Pandaruan River and its tributaries in the Temburong region is predominantly composed of Nypa, Nypa-Heritiera, and Rhizophora species. These plant communities are especially concentrated in upstream areas, where they form an integral part of the region's distinctive wetland ecosystem.
