= Pandaruan Bridge =

Sungai Pandaruan Bridge Jambatan Pandaruan (Jambatan Persahabatan Brunei–Malaysia)
- Coordinates: 4°41′20″N 115°02′09″E
- Carries: Motor vehicles
- Crosses: Pandaruan River
- Locale: Federal Route 1 Pan Borneo Highway
- Official name: Pandaruan Bridge; Brunei–Malaysia Friendship Bridge
- Maintained by: Malaysia; Sarawak Public Works Department (JKR) Brunei; Public Works Department of Brunei (JKRB)

Characteristics
- Design: Box girder bridge
- Total length: 200 m
- Width: 15 metres

History
- Designer: Malaysia; Government of Malaysia; Sarawak Public Works Department (JKR) Brunei; Government of Brunei Darussalam; Public Works Department of Brunei (JKRB)
- Constructed by: Malaysia; Sarawak Public Works Department (JKR) Brunei; Public Works Department of Brunei (JKRB)
- Opened: 8 December 2013; 12 years ago

Location
- Interactive map of Sungai Pandaruan Bridge

The Pandaruan Bridge or Brunei–Malaysia Friendship Bridge (Malay: Jambatan Pandaruan or Jambatan Persahabatan Brunei–Malaysia) is a bridge at the border of Brunei and Malaysia. The bridge crosses the Pandaruan River between Temburong and Limbang. The bridge replaced the ferry service between two countries and was officially opened on 8 December 2013 by the Malaysian Prime Minister, Najib Tun Razak, and the Sultan Hassanal Bolkiah of Brunei.
