= Lawas District =

- Seal

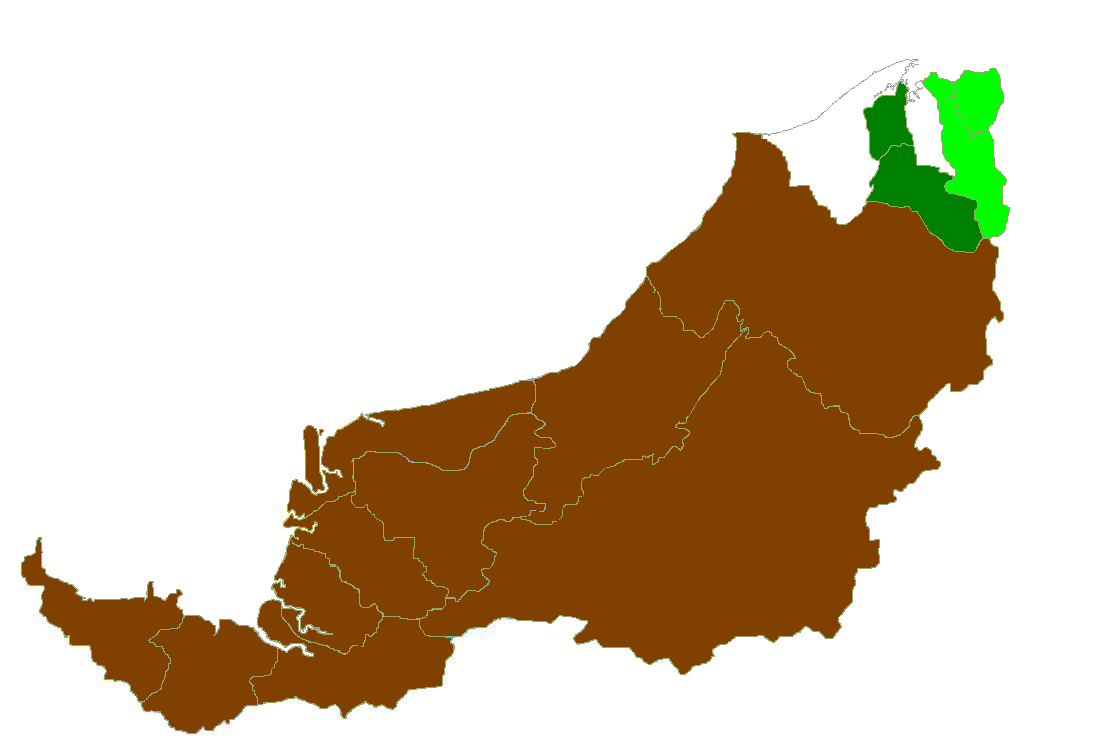
- Country: Malaysia
- State: Sarawak
- District Office location: Lawas
- Local area government(s): Majlis Daerah Lawas

Area
  - Total: 3,811.90 km^{2} (1,471.78 sq mi)

Population (2020)
  - Total: 46,200
  - Density: 12.1/km^{2} (31.4/sq mi)
- District Officer: Pejabat Daerah Lawas dan Pejabat Tanah Daerah Lawas
- Ethnicity: Lun Bawang, Bruneian Malay and Kedayan, Iban, Chinese, Others

The Lawas District is one of the two districts of Limbang Division, Malaysia. The major town is Lawas.

The district area is 3,811.90 square kilometres, and population (year 2020 census) was 46,200.

3 Sub-District in Lawas is divided into Lawas Sub-District, Sundar Sub-District and Trusan Sub-District.

Map of Lawas District
