= Brunei–Malaysia border =

International border

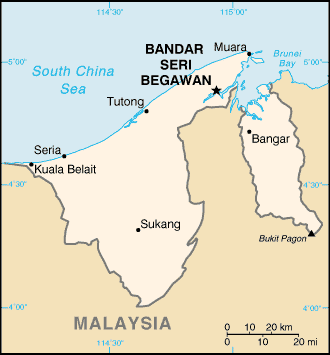
Map of Brunei, showing that the country is composed of two non-contiguous regions, bordering only the country of Malaysia and the South China Sea

The Brunei–Malaysia border divides the territories of Brunei and Malaysia on the island of Borneo. It consists of a 528.45 km (328.36 mi) land border and substantial lengths of maritime borders stretching from the coastline of the two countries to the edge of the continental shelf in the South China Sea.

Brunei's 200 nautical mile continental shelf claim makes it a claimant of a portion of the South China Sea that is subject to multiple overlapping claims by China, Taiwan and Vietnam. Malaysia is also a claimant in the area but a bilateral agreement with Brunei has solved the overlapping claims over Brunei's territorial waters.

== Land border ==
=== The border ===
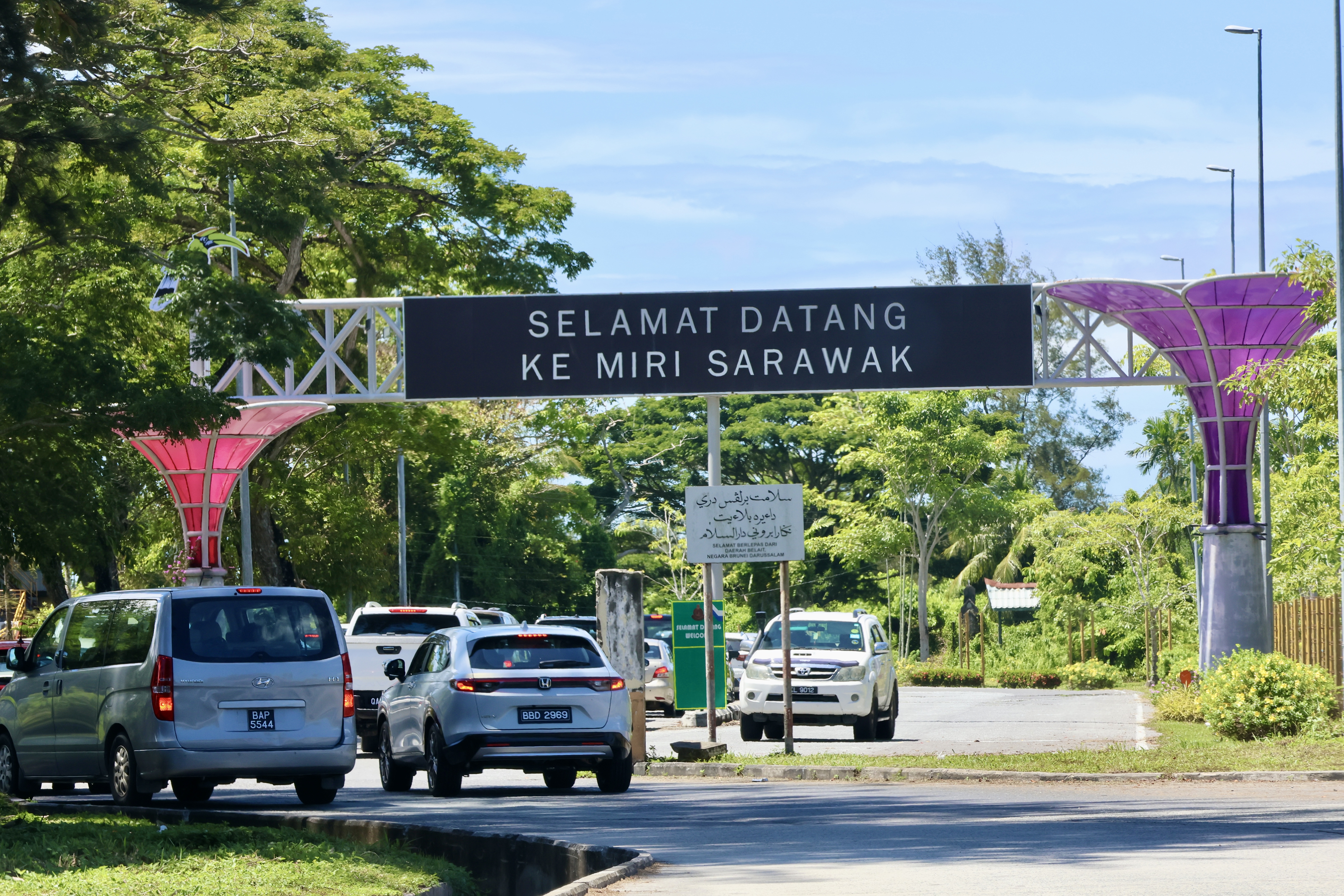
Signboards at the actual location of the Brunei-Malaysia border at the Sungai Tujuh crossing.

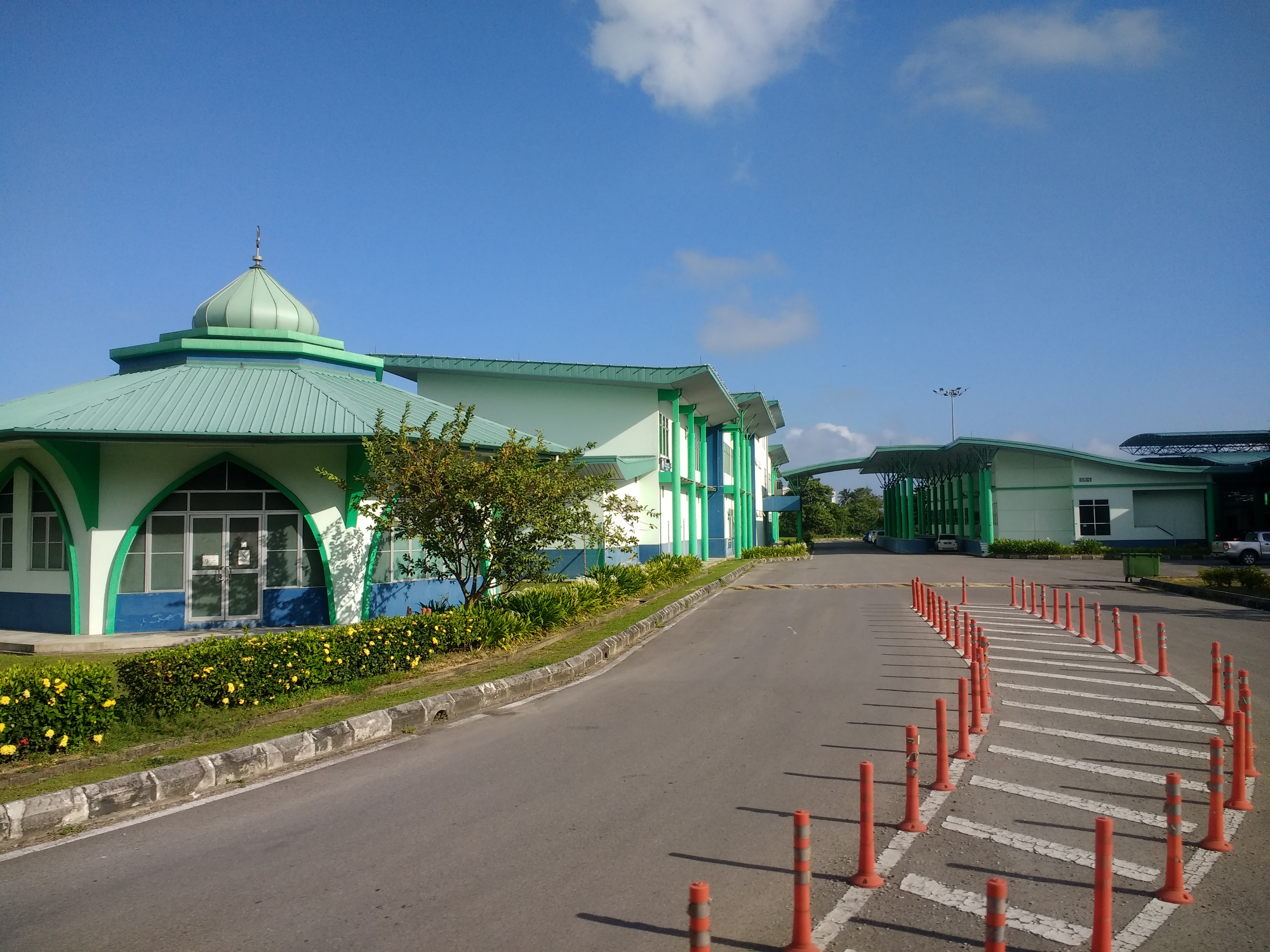
Malaysian border control buildings near the westernmost part of the Malaysia/Brunei border

From west to east, the Brunei–Malaysia border begins where the watershed of the Baram and Belait river basins meet the South China Sea at a point six nautical miles (11 km) east of Tanjung Baram at coordinates 4°35′20″N 114°5′00″E.

It then travels along the watershed of the two river basins for about 30 km to the Pagalayan Canal. It then goes a further 44 km to the Teraja Hills. From there, the border runs along the watershed between the Belait and Tutong rivers on one hand, and the Baram and Limbang rivers on the other. It then proceeds along the watershed of the Brunei and Limbang river basins, enters and runs along Sungai Mendaun, Sungai Melais and Sungai Menunggul (Menunggol) until its estuary at Brunei Bay.

The land border between Malaysia and Brunei's Temburong District (which is separated from the other part of Brunei) starts at the estuary of the Pandaruan River and runs the entire length of the river to its source. It then runs along the watershed between the Temburong river on one hand, and the Limbang and then the Trusan rivers on the other until it reaches Brunei Bay. The northern terminus of this boundary is located at the mouth of the Sungai Bangau, based on the coordinates established by the Sarawak (Definition of Boundaries) Order in Council 1958.

=== Demarcation and Survey ===
As of August 2026, 264.791 km or 50% of the total length of the land boundary has been demarcated and surveyed.

The demarcation and survey process commenced with the "Exchange of Letters" on 16 March 2009 which provided settlement on the status of both the maritime and the 528.45 km land border between the two countries. The Exchange of Letters affirmed five boundary agreements between Brunei and Sarawak from the British colonial ere, with a total length of 207.3 km, while the remaining parts of the border would determined by using the watershed principle to determine the remaining undelimited portions of the border.

Both countries signed the first Memorandum of Understanding for the completion of demarcation and survey of a portion of the border on 26 August 2024. Despite what has been described as slow progress, the demarcation and survey of the entire land boundary is targeted for completion by 2034.

For more details regarding the demarcation and survey, see The Exchange of Letters of 2009 section below.

== Maritime borders ==
=== The border ===
North Borneo (Definition of Boundaries) Order in Council 1958
- Statutory Instrument
- Parliament of the United Kingdom
- Citation: SI 1958/1517

Dates
- Made: 11 September 1958

Other legislation
- Made under: Colonial Boundaries Act 1895

Text of statute as originally enacted

Sarawak (Definition of Boundaries) Order in Council 1958
- Statutory Instrument
- Parliament of the United Kingdom
- Citation: SI 1958/1518

Dates
- Made: 11 September 1958

Other legislation
- Made under: Colonial Boundaries Act 1895

Text of statute as originally enacted

Brunei's maritime boundary with Malaysia until the 100 fathom isobath was inherited from the North Borneo (Definition of Boundaries) Order in Council 1958 (SI 1958/1517)and the Sarawak (Definition of Boundaries) Order in Council 1958 (SI 1958/1518), both of which defined the boundary between Brunei on the one hand, and Sarawak and Sabah, Malaysia, on the other. All three territories were then ruled by Britain. The powers for the orders in council were derived from the British Colonial Boundaries Act 1895 (58 & 59 Vict. c. 34).

Brunei and Malaysia still adhere to the British Orders in Council to define their territorial waters, where it was referred to in the Joint Statement made after the 18th Annual Leaders' Consultation between the Sultan of Brunei and Prime Minister of Malaysia on 3 November 2014 when reference was made to the Sarawak (Definition of Boundaries) Order in Council 1958 as part of the boundary definition process under the terms agreed upon in the 2009 Exchange of Letters. The Orders in Council are also used by Brunei to define the boundaries of its territorial water in its preliminary submission to the Commission on the Limits of the Continental Shelf over its claims to the outer limits of its continental shelf.

The border can be divided into three sectors. From west to east, they are:

==== Western Sector ====
Brunei's western border with Sarawak stretches seaward from the terminus of the land boundary at 4°35′13.74576″N 114°4′33.50928″E into sea following a set of five points to mark the "boundary in the neighbourhood of Tanjong Baram" defined by bearings and distances from a light-structure at 4°35′45″N 113°58′30″E.

Point	Latitude (N)	Longitude (E)	Remarks
Western Sector Border
Boundary in the neighbourhood of Tanjong Baram as defined by the Sarawak (Definition of Boundaries) Order in Council 1958
0	4° 35' 45"	114° 4' 25"	Defined as "the termination at the coast of the land boundary between the Colony of Sarawak and Brunei in approximate position bearing 090 degrees, distant 5.9 miles from the light-structure"
1	4° 39' 20"	114° 4' 18"	"A position bearing 058 ¼ degrees, distant 6.8 miles from the light-structure"
2	4° 39' 46"	114° 4' 22"	"A position bearing 055 ½ degrees, distant 7.1 miles from the light-structure"
3	4° 43' 38"	114° 3' 4"	"Thence along the arc of a circle, radius 4.6 miles, centred upon a point bearing 016 degrees, distant 4.8 miles from the light-structure, to a position bearing 030 degrees, distant 9.1 miles from the light-structure"
4			End point at the 100-fathom depth contour, defined as "the intersection with the 100-fathom depth contour of a straight line drawn in a direction of 314 degrees from the position" defined in Point 3.

==== Western Brunei Bay Sector ====
Brunei's border with Sarawak here consists of a boundary line in Brunei Bay between the mouth of the Pandaruan River in the east, and one of the mouths of the Brunei River in the west, and which encloses a stretch of Malaysian waters adjacent to the mouth of the Limbang River. The Sarawak (Definition of Boundaries) Order in Council 1958 sets ten points to enclose an area described as the "boundary in the approach to Batang Limbang" defined by bearings and distances from a beacon at 4°51′24″N 115°2′54″E.

Point	Latitude (N)	Longitude (E)	Remarks
Western Brunei Bay Sector Border
Boundary in approach to Batang Limbang as defined by the Sarawak (Definition of Boundaries) Order in Council 1958
0	4° 50' 41"	115° 2' 42"	Defined as "The termination of the land boundary between the Colony of Sarawak and Brunei at the northern extremity of the drying mud flat extending from Pulau Siarau in approximate position bearing 195 degrees, distant 0.75 miles from the beacon"
1	4° 51' 15"	115° 3' 13"	"A position bearing 114 degrees, distant 0.35 miles from the beacon"
2	4° 51' 22"	115° 3' 20"	"A position bearing 094 degrees, distant 0.44 miles from the beacon"
3	4° 51' 34"	115° 3' 36"	"A position bearing 077 degrees, distant 0.72 miles from the beacon"
4	4° 52' 15"	115° 4' 1"	"A position bearing 052 ½ degrees, distant 1.40 miles from the beacon"
5	4° 52' 23"	115° 3' 36"	"A position bearing 035 ½ degrees, distant 1.20 miles from the beacon"
6	4° 52' 28"	115° 3' 16"	"A position bearing 018 ½ degrees, distant 1.13 miles from the beacon"
7	4° 52' 36"	115° 2' 55"	"A position bearing 001 degrees, distant 1.20 miles from the beacon"
8	4° 52' 38"	115° 2' 45"	"A position bearing 353 degrees, distant 1.25 miles from the beacon"
9	4° 52' 50"	115° 2' 30"	"The termination of the land boundary between the Colony of Sarawak and Brunei in approximate position bearing 344 ½ degrees, distant 1.48 miles from the beacon"

==== Eastern Sector ====
Brunei's eastern border with Sarawak stretches seaward from terminus of the eastern land border of the Sultanate's Temburong District at the mouth of the Bangau River with the Bay of Brunei, along straight lines joining a set of turning points until the Brunei-Sabah-Sarawak tripoint in the middle of the bay, as described in both the Sarawak (Definition of Boundaries) Order in Council 1958 and North Borneo (Definition of Boundaries) Order in Council 1958 as a "position bearing 050 degrees, distant 10.5 miles from Sapo Point light-structure".

The border, now with Sabah and based on the North Borneo (Definition of Boundaries) Order in Council 1958, then continues in straight lines joining a set of turning points to the mouth of Brunei Bay at a point defined as 310¾ degrees, distant 20.4 miles from Pelong Rocks light-structure which is sited at coordinates at 5°4′45″N 115°3′9″E. From this point, the border runs as a straight line drawn in a direction of 316 degrees from the said position until it intersects the 100 fathom isobath at a point with coordinates 5°13′52.2″N 114°55′12″E.

Point	Latitude (N)	Longitude (E)	Remarks
Eastern Sector Border
Border with Sarawak as defined by the Sarawak (Definition of Boundaries) Order in Council 1958
0	4° 54' 50"	115° 9' 13"	Defined as "The termination of the land boundary between the Colony of Sarawak and the State of Brunei in approximate position bearing 191 degrees, distant 4.05 miles from Sunda Spit beacon", which places it at the mouth of the Bangau River.
1	4° 55' 11"	115° 8' 49"	"A position bearing 198 degrees, distant 3.80 miles from Sunda Spit beacon"
2	4° 55' 36"	115° 8' 36"	"A position bearing 203 ½ degrees, distant 3.49 miles from Sunda Spit beacon"
3	4° 56' 2"	115° 7' 56"	"A position bearing 216 ½ degrees, distant 3.45 miles from Sunda Spit beacon"
4	4° 56' 14"	115° 7' 46"	"A position bearing 221 degrees, distant 3.40 miles from Sunda Spit beacon"
5	4° 56' 27"	115° 7' 45"	"A position bearing 223 ½ degrees, distant 3.25 miles from Sunda Spit beacon"
6	4° 57' 44"	115° 7' 56"	"A position bearing 242 ½ degrees, distant 2.32 miles from Sunda Spit beacon"
7	4° 59' 13"	115° 8' 41"	"A position bearing 287 ½ degrees, distant 1.37 miles from Sunda Spit beacon"
8	5° 0' 6"	115° 8' 57"	"A position bearing 321 degrees, distant 1.67 miles from Sunda Spit beacon"
9	5° 0' 49"	115° 9' 16"	"A position bearing 340 ¼ degrees, distant 2.15 miles from Sunda Spit beacon"
10	5° 1' 42"	115° 9' 51"	"A position bearing 357 degrees, distant 2.90 miles from Sunda Spit beacon"
11	5° 2' 13"	115° 10' 36"	"A position bearing 010 degrees, distant 3.47 miles from Sunda Spit beacon"
12	5° 4' 0"	115° 12' 31"	"A position bearing 025 ¾ degrees, distant 5.77 miles from Sunda Spit beacon"
13	5° 5' 57"	115° 14' 19"	"A position bearing 031 degrees, distant 8.35 miles from Sunda Spit beacon"
Common point of the Brunei, Sabah and Sarawak border
14	5° 6' 30"	115° 15' 49"	"A position bearing 050 degrees, distant 10.5 miles from Sapo Point light-structure"
Border with Sabah as defined by the Sabah (Definition of Boundaries) Order in Council 1958
15	5° 5' 48"	115° 13' 56"	"A position bearing 045 ½ degrees, distant 8.65 miles from Sapo Point light-structure"
16	5° 7' 2"	115° 6' 28"	"A position bearing 350 degrees, distant 7.40 miles from Sapo Point light-structure;"
17	5° 9' 20"	115° 03' 53"	"A position bearing 009 degrees, distant 4.65 miles from Pelong Rocks light-structure"
18	5° 9' 3"	114° 55' 44"	"A position bearing 300 ¼ degrees, distant 8.55 miles from Pelong Rocks light-structure"
19	5° 16' 9"	114° 49' 58"	"A position bearing 311 degrees, distant 17.4 miles from Pelong Rocks light-structure"
20	5° 18' 3"	114° 47' 39"	"A position bearing 310 ¾ degrees, distant 20.4 miles from Pelong Rocks light-structure"
21	5° 13' 52.2"	114° 55' 12"	End point at the 100-fathom depth contour, defined as "the intersection with the 100-fathom depth contour of a straight line drawn in a direction of 316 degrees from the position" defined in Point 20.

The positions of the Sapo Point light structure, on Pulau Muara in Brunei, is given as 4°59′45″N 115°7′45″E, the Sunda Spit beacon, in Sarawak, is 4°58′48″N 115°10′0″E, and the Pelong Rocks light structure in Brunei is 5°4′45″N 115°3′9″E.

=== Continental shelf claim ===
Brunei claims a continental shelf/exclusive economic zone (EEZ) stretching 200 nautical miles from its coast. The boundaries of this zone are effectively the straight line extensions from the terminus of the borders defined by the North Borneo (Definition of Boundaries) Order in Council 1958 and the Sarawak (Definition of Boundaries) Order in Council 1958. It asserts that its eastern boundary extends from the 100 fathom isobath at 5°13′52.2″N 114°55′12″E to 8°15′13.8″N 111°56′16.2″E while the western boundary extends from the 100 fathom isobath at 5°2′00″N 113°46′00″E to 7°35′19.2″N 111°5′30″E. The EEZ outer limit runs between the two distant points parallel to the coast.

Brunei's EEZ claim would include waters surrounding the Spratly Islands in the South China Sea. The area claimed by Brunei however does not include any islands but includes Louisa Reef, which is currently occupied by Malaysia. Until 2009, Malaysia did not recognise Brunei's EEZ claim and stated that Brunei's maritime territories ended at the 100 fathom isobath. In its 1979 territorial waters and continental shelf map, Malaysia claimed the area to be part of its continental shelf and depicted the Brunei-Malaysian border as running up to the 100 fathom isobath. Brunei did not recognise these assertions made by Malaysia. The Exchange of Letters signed on 16 March 2009 by the two countries provided for Malaysia's recognition of Brunei's territorial waters which it had earlier disputed. A joint committee is to determine the final maritime border between the two countries.

== History ==
At its peak in the 15th century, the Bruneian Empire had control over most regions of Borneo, including modern-day Sarawak and Sabah. However, during the 19th century, the Bruneian Empire began to decline and continually lost territory until its present size. In 1842, Sultan Omar Ali Saifuddien II ceded complete sovereignty of Kuching, Sarawak, to the British soldier James Brooke and installed him as the White Rajah in return for quelling a rebellion against him. Subsequent White Rajahs of Sarawak successively leased or annexed territory from Brunei, such as Sibu in 1853, Bintulu in 1861, Baram in 1882, in 1884, Limbang in 1890 and Lawas in 1901 (ceded to the British North Borneo Company which subsequently transferred the territory to Sarawak in 1904). The treaty between the Sultanate and Britain in 1888, which resulted in Brunei becoming a British Protectorate, did not manage to halt the loss of territory. The annexation of the Baram, Trusan and Limbang areas resulted in the current borders of Brunei, with the Limbang annexation, which Brunei had continuously refused to recognise, fragmenting the Sultanate into two non-contiguous territories. Malaysia inherited these borders with Brunei when Sarawak, which had also become a British Protectorate in 1888 and subsequently a Crown Colony after World War II, joined Malaysia on 16 September 1963. Brunei remained a British Protectorate until 1984 when it gained independence.

== Disputes ==
Brunei and Malaysia have had long standing disputes over land and maritime territories. However, due to the cultural ties between the two countries, the disputes have always been low-key and deemed too sensitive to be discussed openly.

The main land dispute was over the district of Limbang which has been controlled by Sarawak since 1890, while the dispute over maritime territory involved virtually the entire deep sea section of the South China Sea claimed by Brunei which Malaysia asserted as its continental shelf in its 1979 map.

The various disputes were deemed settled by both governments with the signing of the Exchange of Letters on 16 March 2009 in Bandar Seri Begawan by the Sultan of Brunei Hassanal Bolkiah and Malaysian Prime Minister Abdullah Ahmad Badawi.

=== Limbang ===
Position of Limbang District in Sarawak that divides Brunei in two

The dispute over Limbang district arose from the annexation of the district by Sarawak's Rajah Charles Brooke in 1890. The "involuntary cession" resulted in Brunei being split into two – the main part with three districts (Brunei-Muara, Tutong and Belait) to the west of Limbang, and the Temburong district to the east of Limbang.

The de facto boundary ran along the watershed between the Brunei River and Limbang River basins on the western side of the district, and along the length of the Pandaruan River on the eastern side. Boundary agreements have delineated a stretch of the western border and the Pandaruan River while the other stretches have yet to be delineated.

With the Exchange of Letters on 16 March 2009, the territorial dispute involving Limbang was deemed solved in Malaysia's favour. See below. In 2011, the Brunei government stated that in the specific meeting in 2009 where media reported that Brunei lifted all claims to Limbang, Brunei reiterated that both parties never mentioned anything about Limbang, more so on Brunei's lifting of the dispute. Effectively, Brunei maintains that it has active claims on the district of Limbang.

=== Continental shelf ===
Brunei has claimed a continental shelf/EEZ stretching 200 nautical miles from its coast, which extends Brunei territorial waters deep into the middle of the South China Sea.

Until 2009, Malaysia did not recognise Brunei's EEZ claim and states that Brunei's maritime territories ended at the 100 fathom isobath as provided in the North Borneo (Definition of Boundaries) Order in Council 1958 and Sarawak (Definition of Boundaries) Order in Council 1958. In 1979, Malaysia published a territorial waters and continental shelf map showing the area claimed by Brunei as its continental shelf/EEZ as belonging to Malaysia. The map also depicts the Brunei-Malaysian border as only running up to the 100 fathom isobath.

Brunei does not recognise the assertions made by Malaysia.

In 2000, Brunei had earlier awarded a concession for a petroleum block called Block J to Shell, Mitsubishi and ConocoPhillips and Block K to France's Total, BHP Billiton and Hess Corp. Subsequently, in 2003, Malaysia's national petroleum company Petronas awarded concessions to its subsidiary Petronas Carigali Sdn Bhd and US-based Murphy Sabah Oil Co. Ltd for two areas, which Malaysia calls Block L and Block M, which lie exactly within the area claimed by Brunei as part of its continental shelf/EEZ.

Later in March 2003, a Bruneian gunboat was sent to drive away a Murphy drilling ship in the area. The following month, the Malaysian navy sent several gunboats into the disputed area to block the arrival of a Total ship. After a tense stand-off involving a single patrol craft from Brunei, Total backed off and both sides stopped work in the disputed areas.

== The Exchange of Letters of 2009 ==
On 16 March 2009, the two countries signed the Exchange of Letters to end all territorial disputes between Brunei and Malaysia.

The Exchange of Letters provided for the final settlement of maritime boundaries between the two countries, the establishment of a joint petroleum revenue area, the agreement to the modalities for demarcating the common border between the two countries, and the recognition of "unsuspendable rights" of movement of Malaysian vessels over Bruneian waters. Although the claim over Limbang was not specifically mentioned, the settlement of border demarcation essentially ends Brunei's claim over the territory. However, this claims is contested by Brunei authorities and the Limbang Question remains unsolved.

=== Limbang unsolved ===
The two countries have never settled their boundary issues and demarcate their common border according to the five historical agreements, of which the two directly concern Limbang, namely the 1920 agreement establishing the Pandaruan River as the Brunei-Sarawak border to the east of Limbang, and the 1933 agreement establishing the Brunei-Sarawak border to the west of Limbang. The two countries have yet to agree to use the watershed principle to fill in the gaps. This essentially reaffirms the "current de facto boundary without major deviation" (reference missing).

This led Malaysia to prematurely declare that the Limbang Question has been settled with Malaysia having unequivocal ownership over Limbang. Brunei however immediately denied Malaysian press reports, saying the Limbang Question was never discussed during negotiations for the Exchange of Letters. Malaysia subsequently said the Limbang Question will be settled once the survey and demarcation of the boundary between the two countries is completed. In 2009, with the report from Brunei media, they announced an end to claim over each other's land, and said to resolve issues related to their maritime borders. The then Brunei Foreign Minister Pehin Lim Jock Seng quickly quelled the report, claiming that Brunei has never dropped claims over Limbang. "In actual fact, the claim on Limbang was never discussed. What was discussed was the demarcation of land boundaries on the whole," he said. The Limbang Question remains an unsolved issue.

=== Land boundary delimitation ===
In terms of boundary delimitation, the Exchange of Letters provided for the ending of the dispute by Brunei agreeing to affirm the five historical boundary agreements.

The agreements together with the sections of borders they delimit from west to east, are as follows:

- Agreement between the Government of Brunei and the Government of Sarawak regarding the boundary between the States of Brunei and Sarawak between the Belait and the Baram rivers from the sea coast to the Pagalayan Canal dated 25 August 1931, which defines a stretch along the western border from a point between the Baram and Belait Rivers with coordinates 4°35′20″N 114°5′00″E as defined by the Sarawak (Definition of Boundaries) Order in Council 1958, to the Palagayan Canal with a length of 29.7 km.
- Agreement regarding the boundary between the State of Brunei and the State of Sarawak dated 4 November 1939, which defined a stretch along the western border between the Pagalayan Canal and Teraja Hills with a length of 43.6 km.
- Agreement between the Government of Brunei and the Government of Sarawak regarding the boundary between the States of Brunei and Sarawak dated 24 February 1933, which defines a stretch from the Brunei Bay to a point west of Gadong Hill along the watershed of the Brunei and Limbang rivers with a length of 37 km.
- Agreement between Government of Brunei and the Government of Sarawak relating to the Pandaruan River and District dated 4 February 1920, which defines the border along the Pandaruan River with a length of 78 km. Article 4(1) The agreement states that, "All lands and rights of every kind and description on the Western bank of the Pandaruan shall belong to and be vested in the Government of Sarawak", while Article 4(2) provides, "All lands and all rights of every kind and description on the Eastern bank of the Pandaruan shall belong to and be vested in the Government of Brunei". This agreement replaced an earlier one dated 21 May 1912.
- Agreement between the Government of Brunei and the Government of Sarawak regarding the boundary between the States of Brunei and Sarawak between Trusan and Temburong dated 31 October 1931, which defines a stretch of the eastern border of Temburong District with a length of 19 km, from the northern terminus at the mouth of the Sungai Bangau as determined by the Sarawak (Definition of Boundaries) Order in Council 1958.

For sections not covered by these agreements, the two countries agreed that their common boundary will be delimited based on the watershed principle.

Under the Exchange of Letters, the two countries agreed to push for the joint demarcation and survey of their common boundary, through the establishment the necessary structures and processes to carry this out. The Memorandum of Understanding on the Process for the Joint Demarcation and Survey of the Land Boundary was signed on 19 March 2012 in Johor Bahru, Malaysia, during the 8th Malaysia–Brunei Darussalam Meeting on the Implementation of the 2009 Exchange of Letters. The MOU provided for the terms of reference and modalities for the demarcation of the land boundary, based on the five land boundary agreements, and to define the boundary based "solely on the basis of the watershed principle" where no land boundary agreements existed.

The first Joint Malaysia-Brunei Darussalam Land Boundary Committee meeting was held on 20-22 August 2022 in Malaysia. Two subsequent meetings were held, on 6 July 2023 in Bandar Seri Begawan and 11 July 2024 in Kuala Lumpur. The fourth meeting was held on 14 July 2025 in Bandar Seri Begawan, while the fifth was held on 5 August 2026 in Putrajaya, in preparation for the 27th Malaysia–Brunei Darussalam Meeting on the Implementation of the 2009 Exchange of Letters on 21 August 2026.

Demarcation work on the ground commenced in 2014, with priority given to the areas identified by the five agreements mentioned above, and named as Sectors A-B, F-G and G-H. In August 2023, 132.25 km equivalent to 25% of the total land boundary length had been demarcated and surveyed, and in August 2024, 175.96 km or 33.3% of the total land boundary length had been demarcated and surveyed. A year later in August 2025, the demarcation and survey progress was reported to have reached 214.638 km or 41%, while in August 2026, progress reached 264.791 km or 50% of the total length of the land boundary.

The progress achieved by 2024 paved the way for the signing of the Memorandum of Understanding on Phase One of the joint demarcation and survey of the boundary the during the 25th Annual Leaders' Consultations held in Brunei. Phase One sectors were described as between Mulu and Ulu Tutong (referred to as Sector D-E), specific sections between Teraja and Mulu (Sector C-D), between Ulu Tutong and Bebuloh (Sector E-F), between Ulu Sungai Pandaruan and Bukit Sagan (Sector K-L), and part of Sector J-K in the vicinity of Jambatan Persahabatan, as well as, Block B in the vicinity of Brunei Bay. Sectors C-D, D-E and E-F involve the boundary between Malaysia and the main part of Brunei, while Sectors J-K and K-L are part of the border between Malaysia and Brunei's Temburung district.

Demarcation works have faced delays in Sector F-G, where there have been overlapping claims along a 6 km stretch of the border. During the 25th Annual Leaders' Consultations in 2024, an Exchange of Notes at the Ministerial-level was signed, reflecting "the strong commitment by both countries to make significant joint progress in the priority areas, specifically Sector F-G, as soon as possible". A Special Joint Brunei-Malaysia Land Boundary Committee on Sector F-G was established, and the two countries "underscored that resolution of Sector F-G must be solely based on the watershed principle" and to "jointly determine a single watershed" for this sector. The previously mentioned timeline to determine the watershed by 31 May 2025 was not mentioned in the 2025 or 2026 Joint Statements, while the deadline for the completion of demarcation and survey for Sector F-G had been set as 31 May 2027.

Both countries are aiming to sign the second MOU for the completion of demarcation and survey of Phase Two of the border covering 66% of the total land border length, by 2028.

=== Maritime territory ===
The Exchange of Letters of 2009 provided for the complete settlement of the dispute over the maritime territory claimed by both countries. The agreement also provided for the final delimitation of the maritime boundaries between the two countries in the South China Sea and Brunei Bay, as well as for an area of joint development for energy resources.

South China Sea

Details of the 2009 Exchange of Letters were not revealed immediately after the signing on 16 March 2009 and news and information regarding the implementation of the terms the agreement, as well as its impact, has been scarce.

However, a Brunei news report on 23 April 2010, more than a year after the signing, quoting the Sultanate's Second Minister for Foreign Affairs and Trade Lim Jock Seng, said Brunei had "retained ownership" of the two petroleum blocks which Malaysia had previously claimed. Lim was also quoted as saying that the matter was "sorted out during last year's agreement". However, as the question to Lim was only on the petroleum blocks, no mention was made pertaining to the disputed territory outside the two petroleum blocks although going by the location of the two blocks which are situated in the middle of the disputed territory, it could be possible to infer that the sovereignty of the entire disputed waters was also solved in Brunei's favour.

Further details on the 2009 Exchange of Letters were revealed on 30 April 2010. Following a spat which was played out in the media between former Malaysian prime minister Abdullah Ahmad Badawi, who was a signatory of the 2009 Exchange of Letters, and his predecessor Mahathir Mohamad, Abdullah revealed that the 2009 Exchange of Letters settled the issue of sovereignty of the area in dispute whereby "sovereign rights of the resources" in the disputed area "belonged to Brunei". This effectively stated that Malaysia had agreed to drop its claim over the disputed maritime territory. At the same time, Abdullah said the agreement ensured Malaysia's participation in any commercialisation of oil and gas from the area, thereby guaranteeing Malaysia's share in the resources of the area.

The spat began when Mahathir accused Abdullah of "signing away" Malaysia's rights over hydrocarbon resources in the area, specifically in Blocks L and M, in exchange for Brunei giving its claim over Limbang. His comments followed the announcement by Murphy Oil Corp which said that its production sharing contract with Petronas for two petroleum blocks which were situated within Brunei's EEZ claim, had been terminated because they were "no longer a part of Malaysia".

In response, Petronas issued a statement on 1 May 2010 confirming that it had terminated its production sharing contracts with its subsidiary Petronas Carigali Sdn Bhd and Murphy Sabah Oil Co Ltd as the two production blocks were no longer Malaysian territory. It added that the settlement of the territorial dispute through the signing of the 2009 Exchange of Letters has allowed it to enter into new production sharing contracts for the two blocks.

This was followed by Malaysia's Foreign Ministry on 3 May 2010 confirming Malaysia's recognition of the sovereignty of two petroleum blocks as belonging to Brunei. It stated that the decision to recognise this was given effect through the 2009 Exchange of Letters was based on the provisions of the United Nations Convention of the Law of the Sea.

Malaysia's submission to the Commission on the Limits of the Continental Shelf for the extended continental shelf in the South China Sea, which was lodged on 6 May 2009, continued to not recognise Brunei's continental shelf, EEZ and extended continental shelf claims. Coordinates and maps delineating Malaysia's 200 nautical mile limit off the coast of its Borneo states of Sabah and Sarawak form a continuous line from its intersecting point with the 200 nautical mile limit for the Philippines in the north, and the Indonesia-Malaysia maritime border in the south, despite Brunei forming an enclave in northern Sarawak which should have resulted in a break in Malaysia's 200 nautical mile line.

Malaysia's submission was jointly made with Vietnam where both countries claimed a "defined area" over which both countries currently have overlapping claims. Brunei should also have a competing claim over a portion of the "defined area". However, unlike China and the Philippines which objected to the Malaysia-Vietnam joint submission, there is no record of Brunei registering any similar objection.

Brunei has not submitted its extended continental shelf claim to Commission on the Limits of the Continental Shelf. However, in its preliminary submission which it lodged with the commission on 12 May 2009, it gave notice of its intention to claim a continental shelf beyond its 200 nautical mile limit. It defined its current "territorial sea and continental shelf" boundary with Malaysia in accordance with the North Borneo (Definition of Boundaries) Order in Council 1958 and Sarawak (Definition of Boundaries) Order in Council 1958 up to the 100 fathom isobath, and its "territorial sea, exclusive economic zone and continental shelf" boundary with Malaysia up to the 200 nautical mile limit in accordance with 16 May 2009 Exchange of Letters between the two countries. No details of the boundaries were however given. Brunei said its full submission which should bear the necessary details, will be lodged at a later date.

Brunei Bay

Unlike the maritime boundaries in the South China Sea, news regarding the effects of the 2009 Exchange of Letters on the maritime boundary between the two countries in Brunei Bay has been virtually non-existent.

To date, the only news regarding efforts to determine the boundary in Brunei Bay came after the 18th Annual Leaders' Consultation between Malaysia and Brunei on 3 November 2014. The joint statement issued after the consultation stated that a Standard Operating Procedure for the joint hydrographic survey for the maritime boundary from the Pandaruan River and Menunggol (or Menunggul) River to their respective end-points as provided by the Sarawak (Definition of Boundaries) Order in Council (OIC) 1958 had been adopted on 24 March 2014, the respective end-points being 4°51′30″N 115°2′48″E located at the northern extremity of Pulau Siarau at the estuary of the Pandaruan River, and 4°52′48″N 115°3′24″E at Pulau Silamak, which is located at a distance from the mouth of the Menunggul River.

== Joint commercial arrangement area ==
The Exchange of Letters in 2009 also establishes a joint commercial arrangement area for the two countries to share the proceeds from the exploitation of hydrocarbon resources in the disputed area. However, details as to the percentage split between the two countries and the full extent of the joint commercial arrangement area was not revealed.

A Memorandum of Understanding between Brunei National Petroleum Company and Petroliam Nasional Berhad (PETRONAS) on Cooperation in the Oil and Gas sector was subsequently signed although the date is unknown. On 1 May 2010, Petronas issued a statement which said it had been invited by Brunei to participate in the development of Blocks L and M, which have since been redesignated Blocks CA1, with an area of 5,850 square kilometres (increased from 5,021 square kilometres for the previous Block J), and CA2 with an area of 4,944 square kilometres. Both blocks lie about 100 km off the shore of Brunei. Petronas said it has set up a team to begin negotiations with Brunei to work out the terms of the commercial agreement.

In its statement on 3 May 2010, Malaysia's Foreign Ministry said the 2009 Exchange of Letters provided for the establishment of a joint commercial arrangement area "incorporating these blocks", namely the newly renamed Blocks CA1 and CA2.

On 21 September 2010, a Deed of Amendment to the original Production Sharing Agreement for CA1 which was sealed in 2003, was signed between the Brunei National Petroleum Company on one hand, and Petronas Carigali, a subsidiary of Malaysia's Petroliam Nasional Berhad (Petronas) and Canam Brunei, a wholly owned subsidiary of Murphy Oil Corporation. The Deed of Amendment was to vary the earlier agreement signed in 2003 to include the two new parties as a result of the joint commercial agreement by reducing BHP Billiton's stake to 22.5% from 25%, and Hess from 15% to 13.5%. This frees up a 10% stake to be taken up by newcomers Petronas and Canam Brunei. The remaining 54% (down from 60%) stake belongs to Total, allowing it to resume operations in the area after suspending activities since 2003.

The Production Sharing Agreement for CA2 was signed on 13 December 2010. This block is run by a consortium of PETRONAS Carigali Brunei Ltd (operator), Canam Brunei Oil Ltd. (Murphy), Shell Deep Water Borneo Ltd, ConocoPhillips & Diamond E&P B.V. (Mitsubishi).

During the 15th Annual Brunei-Malaysia leaders' consultation which was held on 12 September 2011, the Sultan of Brunei Hassanal Bolkian and Malaysian Prime Minister Najib Razak released a joint statement declaring that the Brunei National Petroleum Company and Petroliam Nasional Berhad (PETRONAS) will work on a joint undertaking in Brunei Darussalam's 883-square kilometre Block N under the framework of a production sharing contract, while an announcement after the 16th Annual leaders' consultation added the 1,115-square kilometre Block Q as well as downstream activities.

Both Blocks N and Q are inbound offshore blocks located at the eastern shallow waters off Brunei and are in addition to the original disputed CA1 and CA2. The Production Sharing Agreements awarded by PetroleumBRUNEI to PETRONAS Carigali Brunei Ltd and Shell Deepwater Borneo Ltd for Blocks N and Q were signed on 8 December 2013 in conjunction with the 17th Annual Malaysia-Brunei Leaders' Consultation held in Bandar Seri Begawan. Both PETRONAS Carigali Brunei Ltd and Shell Deepwater Borneo Ltd have 50:50 equity interests in their respective blocks, where PETRONAS Carigali Brunei is the operator of Block N while Shell Deepwater Brunei operates Block Q.

At the same event, PETRONAS signed a Head of Agreement with National Unitisation Secretariat of Brunei Darussalam towards formalising a unitisation arrangement for Malaysia's Kinabalu West NAG field and Brunei's Maharajalela North Panel field, with negotiations tasked to a Brunei Darussalam and PETRONAS Unitisation Joint Working Group. The HOA will pave the way for the resolution of a number of issues relating to the unitisation and future development of these straddling fields.

The two parties also signed another Head of Agreement towards a provisional arrangement for joint development of Malaysia's Gumusut/Kakap field and Brunei's Geronggong/Jagus-East field. The HOA establishes the joint development parameters for the fields based on a provisional production and cost sharing arrangement until a further agreement is reached on the status of the fields.

Cooperation between the two parties extended to ventures beyond the former disputed territory. An agreement was also signed for PetroleumBRUNEI to acquire a 3% interest in PETRONAS's Canadian shale gas asset and in PETRONAS' proposed Canadian liquefied natural gas (LNG) facility. As part of the transaction, PetroleumBRUNEI has agreed to buy a 3% share of the LNG facility's production for a minimum of 20 years.

== Border crossings ==
The following are major border crossings into Malaysia, with the names of the Brunei checkpoints followed by the Malaysian checkpoints:

=== Road ===
Brunei			Malaysia			Notes	Geographical coordinates
Road	Border post	Opening hours	Road	Border post	Opening hours	Notes	Geographical coordinates
	Sungai Tujoh, Belait	0600–2200	Miri–Baram Highway (Route 1–82)	Sungai Tujuh, Miri	0600–2200		4.585836°N 114.075935°E
	Kuala Lurah, Brunei-Muara	0600–2200	Route 1–83	Tedungan, Limbang	0600–2200		4.740156°N 114.813551°E
	Ujung Jalan, Temburong District	0600–2200	Route 1–87	Pandaruan, Limbang	0600–2200	The crossing is via the Malaysia-Brunei Friendship Bridge over the Pandaruan River	4.689018°N 115.035800°E
	Labu, Temburong	0600–2200	Route 1–88	Mengkalap, Lawas, Limbang	0600–2200		4.791219°N 115.237361°E

=== Ferry ===
Brunei		Notes	Geographical coordinates	Malaysia		Notes	Geographical coordinates
Port	Opening hours	Notes	Geographical coordinates	Port	Opening hours	Notes	Geographical coordinates
Serasa Ferry Terminal	24 hours		5.015460°N 115.064891°E	Labuan Ferry Terminal (Passenger jetty and RO-RO Ramp)	24 hours		5.277523°N 115.241388°E

== See also ==
- Brunei-Malaysia relations
- Video clip of the Brunei-Malaysia boundary marker construction
- Video clip of the boundary marker construction at the coast in Sungai Tujoh
