= Kampong Bokok =

Village in Brunei

Bokok
- Village
- Kampong Bokok
- Location in Brunei
- Coordinates: 4°39′07″N 115°03′03″E
- Country: Brunei
- District: Temburong
- Mukim: Bokok

Government
  - Village head: Abdullah Mahmood

Area
  - Total: 63 ha (160 acres)

Population (2021)
  - Total: 160
  - Density: 250/km^{2} (660/sq mi)
- Time zone: UTC+8 (BNT)
- Postcode: PE1951

Kampong Bokok (Malay: Kampung Bokok) or simply Bokok, is a village in Temburong District, Brunei, about 10 kilometres (6.2 mi) from the district town Bangar. The population was 160 in 2021. It is one of the villages within Mukim Bokok. The postcode is PE1951.

== Etymology ==
Kampong Bokok's historical name is the reason it is known as "Bokok." There are two tales concerning how the name "Bokok" came to be, according to the village elders. The first comes from Sungai Bokok (Bokok River), a little river that empties into the Rataie River. Second, it originates from takuyung (Potamides cerithium) known as takuyung bakak in Murut. Due to its form, which resembles a human bending over, Malaysians commonly refer to it as Bokok.

== Demography ==
Kampong Bokok has a community of 464 people who live within its 63 hectares, 226 men and 238 women, in 2018. There are 395 Malays, 45 Ibans, and 24 other races among those. There are 419 Muslims overall, with the remaining members of various other faiths.

== Economy ==
Kampong Bokok produces a variety of sweets, including wajid java and wajid rice, for its own subsistence and not specifically to be turned into a product under Majlis Perundingan Kampung (MPK) Bokok's 1 Kampung 1 Produk (1K1P) branding, just like other villages in Temburong District that each have different productions and products as an activity in the economic sector. According to its ketua kampung, these people are often invited by certain parties such as participating in Bandarku Ceria in Bandar Seri Begawan, hotels and so on to display and sell the results of their efforts there. Also on display to customers is wajid which is an attraction of Temburong District in addition to Temburong Cendol and lobster.

== Infrastructure ==
Kampung Bokok shares all the amenities the Government of Brunei provides for the convenience of the populace and inhabitants, including roads, a clean water supply, power, telephone lines, religious schools, mosques, and gathering places, much like other villages in the Temburong District. The villages also got financial aid in the form of old age pensions for 57 individuals, Community Development Department Assistance (JAPEM) for eight people, poor aid for seven, orphan aid for six, conversion aid for 21 persons, and OKU aid for one for disabled people.

=== Education ===
Bokok Religious School is the village's government school for the country's Islamic religious primary education.

=== Mosque ===
The village mosque is Pengiran Haji Abu Bakar Mosque. It was inaugurated on 26 February 1988 and can accommodate 200 worshippers.
