= Kampong Semabat =

Village in Brunei

- Village
- Location in Brunei
- Coordinates: 4°34′24″N 115°04′21″E
- Country: Brunei
- District: Temburong
- Mukim: Bokok

Population (2021)
  - Total: 95
- Time zone: UTC+8 (BNT)
- Postcode: PE4151

Kampong Semabat is a village in Temburong District, Brunei, about 21 kilometres (13 mi) from the district town Bangar. The population was 95 in 2021. It is one of the villages within Mukim Bokok. The postcode is PE4151.

== Etymology ==
Kampong Semabat got its name from the word "Sebabat", which meant satu ikat (one knot/tie) in Murut language. According to folktale, a Murut man washed away a bundle (sebabat) of wood that went down the Semabat river to construct a house during that time.

== Facilities ==
Semabat Primary School is the village's government primary school.

The village mosque is Balai Ibadat Kampong Semabat. It was built in 1994 and can accommodate 200 worshippers.
