= Kampong Belais =

Village in Brunei

- Village
- Location in Brunei
- Coordinates: 4°40′23″N 115°02′31″E
- Country: Brunei
- District: Temburong
- Mukim: Bokok

Government
  - Village head: Afnan Gapor

Population (2021)
  - Total: 109
- Time zone: UTC+8 (BNT)

Kampong Belais is a village in Temburong District, Brunei. The population is 109 in 2021. (Note: see Administration section) It is one of the villages within Mukim Bokok.

== Etymology ==
The name belais is a type of fish.

== Administration ==
For census and postcode purposes Kampong Belais is established as two villages:

Village	Population (2021)	Postcode
Kampong Belais Besar	92	PE1351
Kampong Belais Kecil	17	PE1551
Total	109	-

Kampong Belais shares a village head (ketua kampung) with Kampong Buda-Buda.

== Facilities ==
The village mosque is Kampong Belais Mosque. The construction began in 1994 and completed in 1996. It can accommodate 300 worshippers.
