= Kampong Buda-Buda =

Village in Brunei

- Village
- Location in Brunei
- Coordinates: 4°40′55″N 115°02′33″E
- Country: Brunei
- District: Temburong
- Mukim: Bokok

Population (2016)
  - Total: 111
- Time zone: UTC+8 (BNT)
- Postcode: PE1151

Kampong Buda-Buda is a village in Temburong District, Brunei. The population was 111 in 2016. It is one of the villages within Mukim Bokok. The postcode is PE1151.
