= Kampong Menengah =

The name Kampong Menengah may refer to:

- Kampong Menengah, village in Mukim Bangar, Temburong District, Brunei
- Kampong Menengah, village in Mukim Lamunin, Tutong District, Brunei
