= Kampong Puni =

Village in Brunei

- Village
- Location in Brunei
- Coordinates: 4°41′42″N 115°02′43″E
- Country: Brunei
- District: Temburong
- Mukim: Bangar

Government
  - Village head: Ashawary Abdul Rahman

Population (2021)
  - Total: 259
- Time zone: UTC+8 (BNT)
- Postcode: PA3751

Kampong Puni is a village in Temburong District, Brunei, about 3–4 kilometres (1.9–2.5 mi) from the district town Bangar. The population was 259 in 2021. It is one of the villages within Mukim Bangar. The postcode is PA3751.

== Infrastructure ==
Puni Primary School is the village's government primary school. It also shares grounds with Puni Religious School, the village's government school for the country's Islamic religious primary education.

The village mosque is Kampong Puni Mosque. It was inaugurated on 5 November 1982 and can accommodate 200 worshippers.

== Notable people ==
- Abdul Ghani Abdul Rahim (born 1966), politician and writer
