= Mukim Bangar =

Mukim of Brunei

- mukim
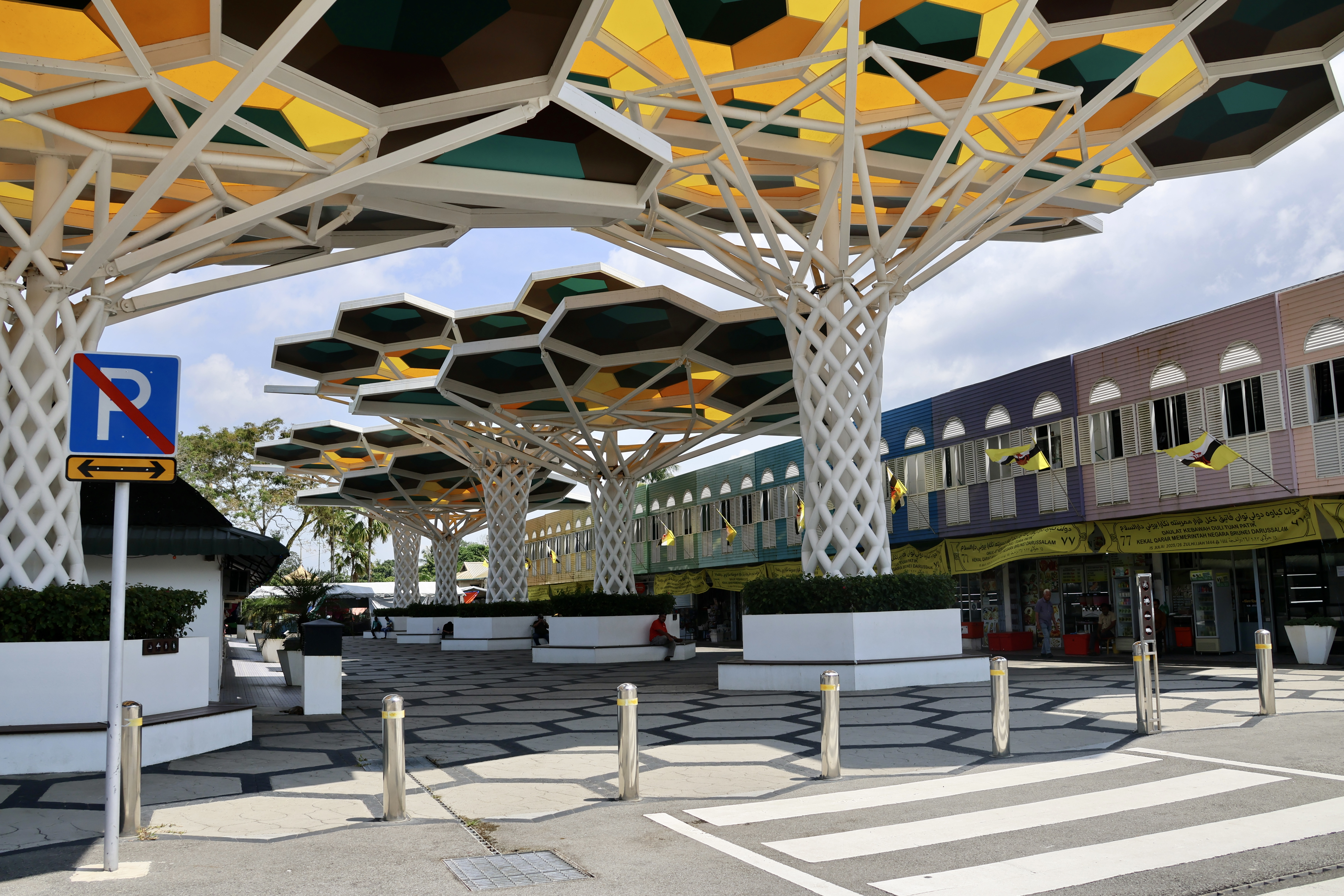
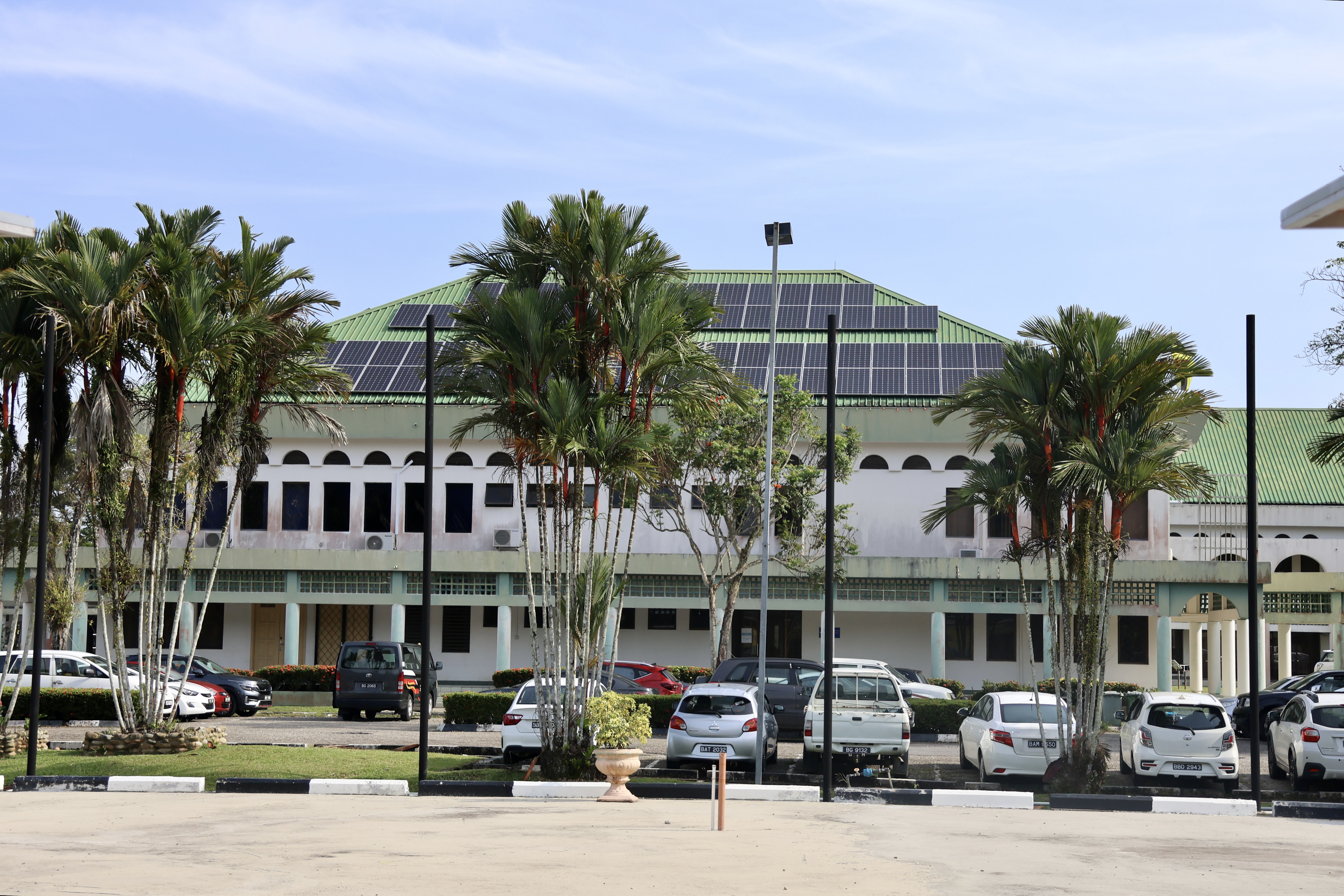
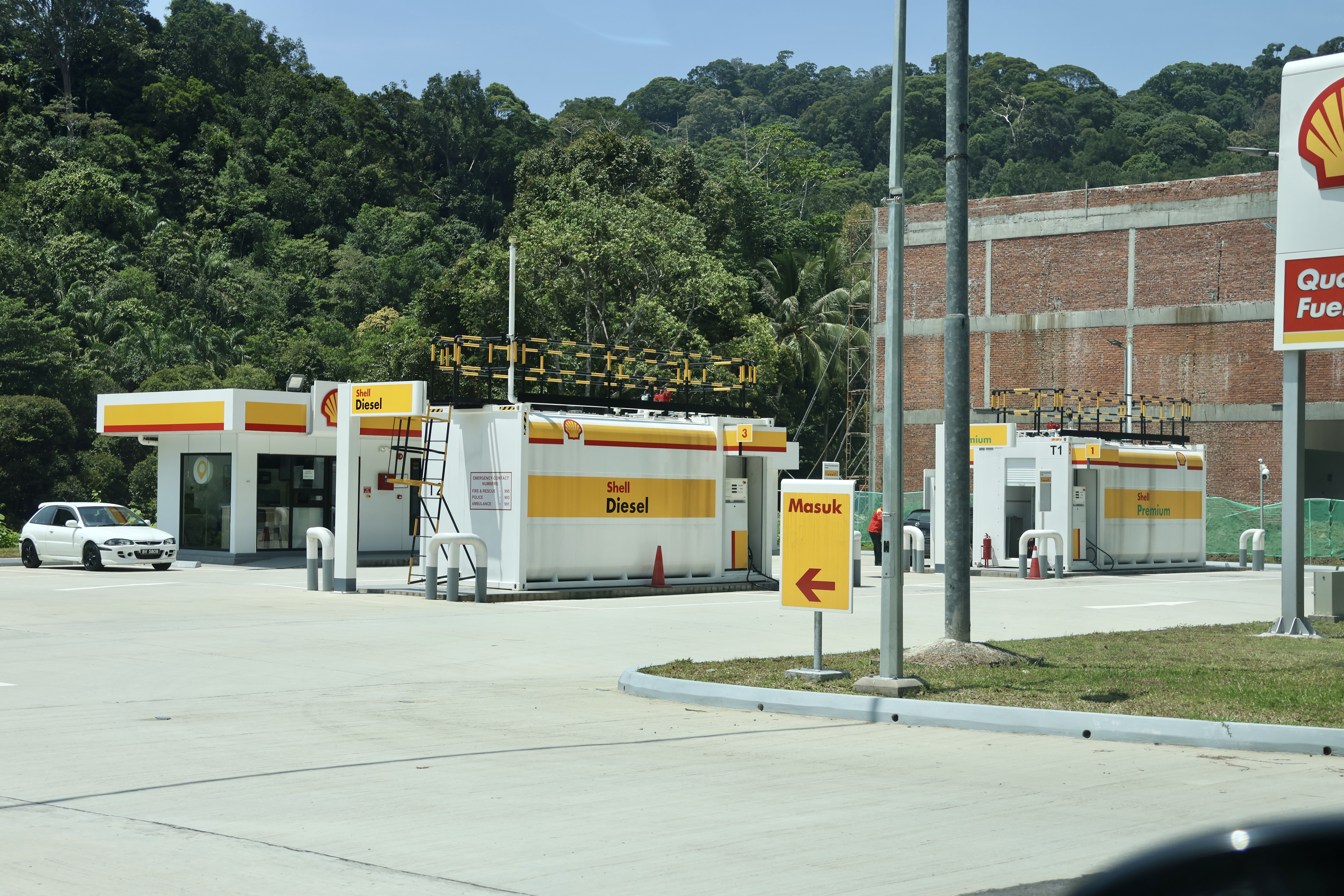
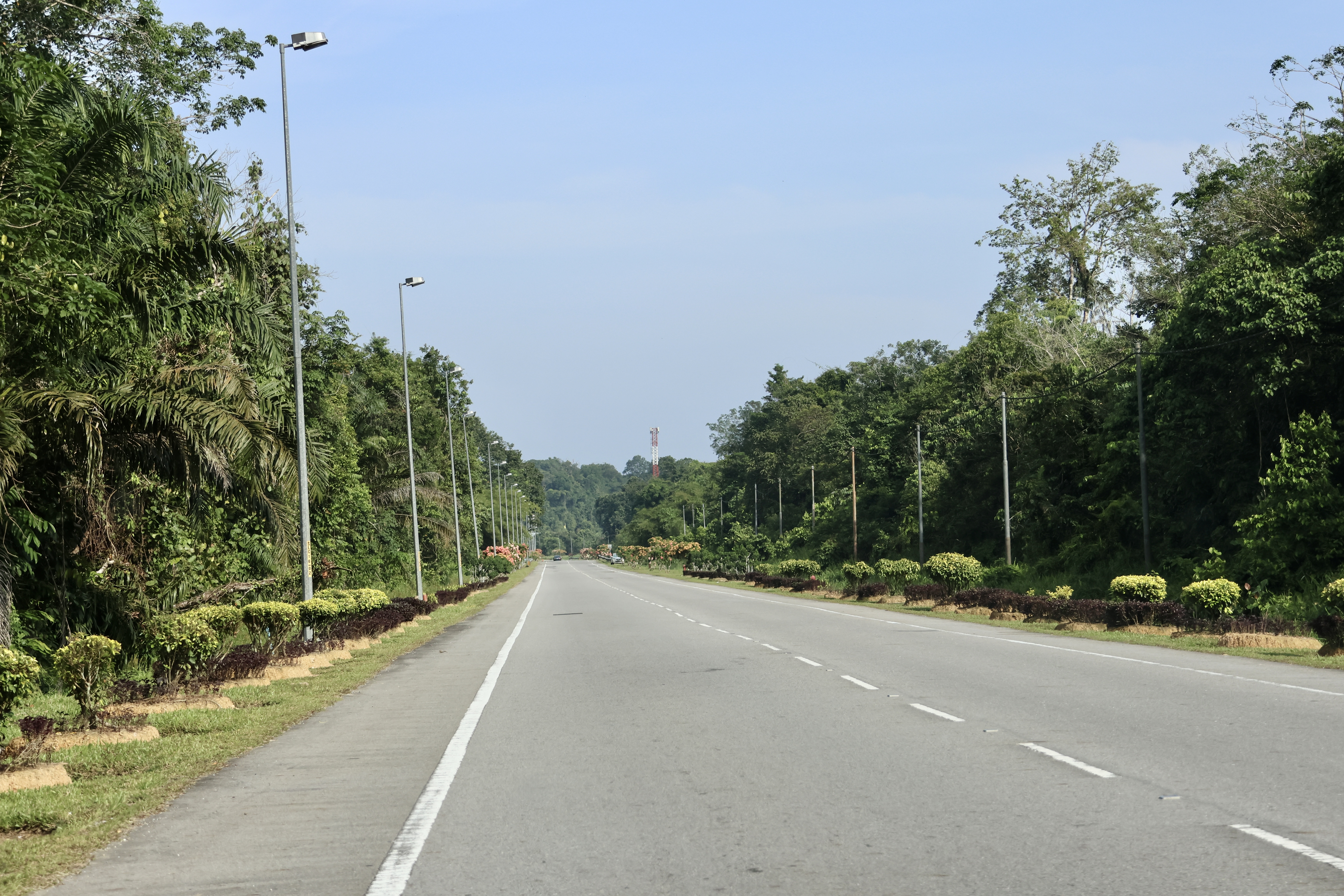
- Clockwise from top left: Bangar Town, Temburong District Office, Jalan Labu, Kampong Semamang

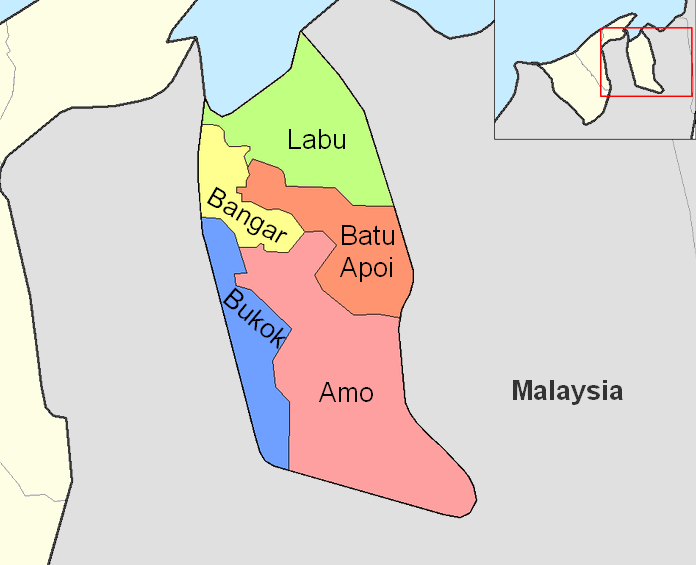
- Mukim Bangar depicted in yellow.
- Coordinates: 4°42′30″N 115°4′25″E
- Country: Brunei Darussalam
- District: Temburong

Government
  - Penghulu: Sulaiman Nasir

Area
  - Total: 113 km^{2} (44 sq mi)

Population (2021)
  - Total: 2,112
  - Density: 18.7/km^{2} (48.4/sq mi)
- Time zone: UTC+8 (BNT)
- Postcode: PAxx51

Mukim Bangar (BAHNG-gahr) is a mukim within Temburong District exclave, in Brunei Darussalam. It has a total area of 113 square kilometres (44 square miles); the population was 2,112 in 2021. The mukim encompasses Bangar, the district's sole town and administrative centre.

== Etymology ==
The mukim is named after the town Bangar, which is also the predominant settlement it encompasses.

== Geography ==
The mukim is located in the north-west of the Temburong District, bordering Mukim Labu to the north, Mukim Batu Apoi to the east, Mukim Amo to the south-east, Mukim Bokok to the south-west, and Limbang District in the Malaysian state of Sarawak to the west and north. Mukim Bangar has one island within its vicinity which is Pulau Kibi. It has a total area of 113 square kilometres (44 square miles).

== Demographics ==
As of the 2021 census, the population was 2,112 with 56.2% males and 43.8% females. The mukim had 500 households occupying 471 dwellings. Among the population, 25.6% lived in urban areas, while the remainder of 74.4% lived in rural areas. Mukim Bangar has a total of nineteen villages, and Penghulu Mukim Bangar has the catchment of four village heads, namely Kampong Tengah, Batang Tuau, Puni and Ujong Jalan, and Belingos, with a population of 2,558 people in 2015, made up of various nationalities including Malay, Murut, Iban, Chinese, and other nationalities.

== Administration ==
As of 2021, the mukim comprised the following census of the villages:

settlements	population (2021)	village head (2024)
Bangar Town	451	—N/a
Kampong Bang Bulan	20	—N/a
Kampong Batang Tuau	308	Ashawary bin Haji Abdul Rahman
Kampong Batu Bejarah	83	—N/a
Kampong Belingos	22	Ishraqi bin Haji Sidup @ Haji Hidup
Kampong Gadong (Note: Not to be confused with Gadong, a commercial area in the country's capital Bandar Seri Begawan)	70	—N/a
Kampong Kinalong	12	—N/a
Kampong Lagau	53	—N/a
Kampong Menengah (Note: Not to be confused with the village of the same name in Mukim Lamunin, Tutong District)	183	Mohamad Aiman bin Haji Ali
Kampong Parit Belayang	66	—N/a
Kampong Piungan	25	—N/a
Kampong Puni	259	Ashawary bin Haji Abdul Rahman
Kampong Semamang	4	—N/a
Kampong Seri Tanjong Belayang	113	—N/a
Kampong Sungai Tanam	119	—N/a
Kampong Sungai Tanit	156	—N/a
Kampong Sungai Sulok	64	—N/a
Kampong Ujong Jalan	104	—N/a

== Villages ==
=== Kampong Menengah ===
Kampong Menengah was originally known as Kampong Kastam Lama. Following the relocation of the administrative headquarters from Kampong Kastam Lama to Pekan Bangar in 1940, residents of Kampong Kastam Lama gradually began moving toward this new administrative centre. Situated on one side of the river were Kampong Gadong, Kampong Batang Tulit, and Kampong Baru, while on the opposite side were Kampong Parit Menengah, Kampong Parit Puak, Kampong Sungai Tanam, Kampong Sungai Tanit, and Kampong Sungai Suluk. Although the population of Kampong Menengah once exceeded 2,000, it currently stands at approximately 800 due to the relocation of residents to the National Housing Plan in Kampong Rataie, Mukim Bokok.

Due to its low-lying position in Brunei Darussalam, Kampong Menengah’s road system was upgraded with flood prevention measures in 2010, and the improvements were completed the following year. The village is provided with essential utilities, including electricity, water, and telephone services. To support local fishermen, the Brunei government constructed a community hall and a boat ramp for easy access to the river. However, because of its close proximity to Bangar, the village does not have amenities such as mosques or schools.

The Karipap Mini MPK Menengah, introduced in 2009 under the 'One Village, One Product' initiative, is a popular local product from this area. This project has generated profits of B$16,000 to $17,000, which are shared among the MPK members involved in its production, including shareholders from the project’s inception. In addition to the Karipap Mini, Kampong Menengah produces two other supporting products, including beadwork, crafted by local residents.

=== Kampong Batang Tuau ===
Kampong Batang Tuau plays a role in helping the government to improve the economy of Brunei Darussalam, especially in the field of agriculture. This is clearly evidenced by the involvement of the villagers in working on the production of local fruit crops in the Rural Agricultural Development Farm (KPLB), in Kampong Seri Tanjung Belayang, which is also an area under the catchment area of the Ketua Kampong Batang Tuau, Awang Haji Jainih bin Haji Tahir. Since being appointed in 2005, he has seen the determination of the villagers in cultivating local fruit crops, especially through group farms in the KPLB farm area. Batang Tuau is a geographical name that does not resemble an animal or a bird. Awang Sigar claims that Tuau is the Murut word for Merak, a kind of peafowl, stating that the region used to have a lot of peafowls. The area was really called 'batang' because a large tree was preferred by peafowl, who used to perch from its limbs.

In addition to activities and generating daily income, the involvement of the villagers in the production of local fruits is also to support the ongoing efforts of the Department of Agriculture and Agri-Food, to increase the production of local fruit crops. Their involvement is also expected to make the new generation aware of the importance of conserving the diversity of local fruits from extinction due to the rapid development of the country. What is expected is that the farmers will work their fields regularly and more systematically according to methods and techniques and good agricultural practices so that it becomes one of the sources of profitable income, in addition to being a catalyst for the generation and improvement of the national economy.

The Ketua kampong a catchment area up to Kampong Seri Tanjung Belayang with an area of 759 hectares (1,880 acres), while the population is 539 people consisting of Malays, Ibans and Chinese; where most of the population consists of youth, in addition to that also inhabited by foreigners. A number of residents under the care of the Ketua Kampong Batang Tuau also received assistance from the Government of Brunei, such as old age pensions, welfare assistance, orphans, and new relatives.

=== Kampong Belingos ===
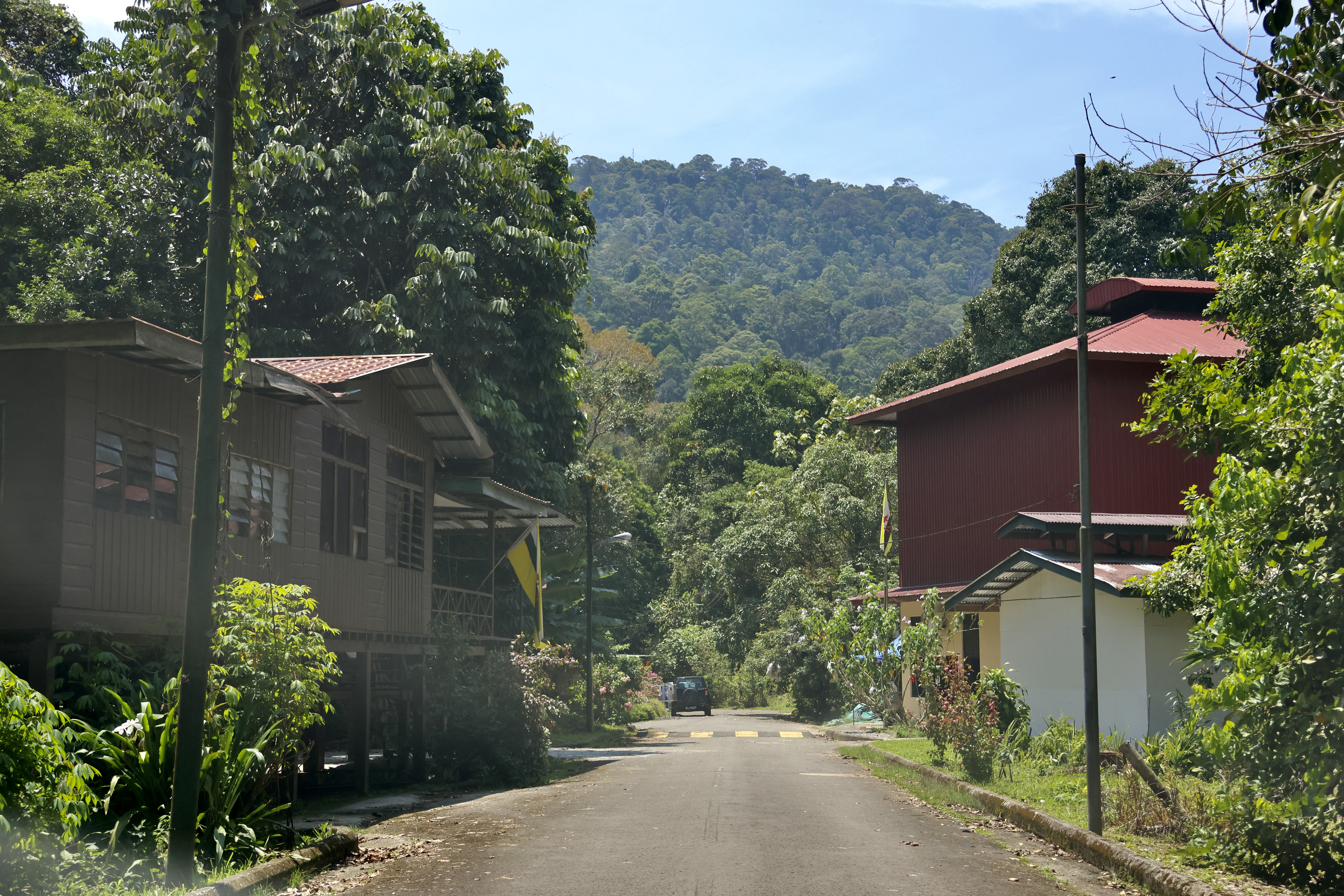
Kampong Belingos in 2023.

Located about 5.6 kilometres (3.5 miles) from Pekan Bangar, when traveling to Ulu Belalong in Mukim Amo, visitors will pass a village that looks calm and peaceful known as Kampong Belingos. According to the story of the ancients, the name of the village was named by the Murut tribe, however the meaning of the word Belingos is unknown. The name may come from a tributary called Belingos River. Kampong Belingos is under the supervision of a ketua kampong, Awang Haji Sulaiman bin Haji Ahad. Besides itself, several other surrounding areas, namely Kampong Lagau, Kampong Piungan, Kampong Bang Bulan, Kampong Kinalong, Kampong Subok, Kampong Simamang, and Pekan Bangar are also under the supervision of Awang Haji Sulaiman.

The population of Belingos is only 58 people with nine private houses, where most of the residents work with the government sector, and the rest farm and work as fishermen. In this village is located the Electric Power Station that supplies electricity to the entire Temburong District. Residents in Kampong Belingos and the surrounding areas also receive basic facilities provided by the Government of Brunei, such as roads, electricity supply, clean water supply, telephone lines, and roadside refuse collection, in addition to public facilities such as public halls and bridges.

Belingos also does not want to be left behind in helping the government improve the economy through various enterprises. Among the enterprises operated in this village is an agricultural project which is the cultivation of gray oyster mushrooms. With capital from the villagers, the project started in February 2009 under the 'One Village One Product' programme. In addition, financial assistance is also provided by the government through the Ministry of Home Affairs, as well as building equipment assistance from the private sector. In addition, the villagers are also working on a musk lime pickle project which has been working since June 2014. According to the population percentage for Belingos and the surrounding area, 45 percent of the population work in the government sector. For residents who do not work with the government, they work or are self-employed such as fishing, growing rice, growing vegetables and fruits, raising chickens (for sale), handicrafts, opening restaurants, making/selling pastries, opening car workshop, opening an outboard motor/light machine engine workshop.

=== Kampong Lagau ===
About 4.7 kilometres (2.9 miles) separate Kampong Lagau from Pekan Bangar. According to elders' oral histories, the Murut tribe is also responsible for the village's name. According to their tale, the Murut tribe believed that after a few days, someone would pass away if the locals heard a voice that sounded like a melau (calling) from a hill close to the hamlet. The community is currently known as Kampong Lagau, despite the fact that this notion is no longer held. There are 17 buildings and 82 residents in the community of Kampong Lagau. Seven of the citizens come from Chinese families, while the Murut Tribe makes up the majority of the population. One of the residents who is Chinese has a vehicle workshop in this village that offers services such as car washing, automobile servicing, and auto repairs.

=== Kampong Piungan ===
About 4.1 kilometres (2.5 miles) separate Pekan Bangar from Kampung Piungan. Because the residents used to enjoy obtaining water from a stream that is still there today for everyday purposes, the name of this settlement originates from the Murut Tribe. Using dried keduit fruit that has been punctured under the stem to enter the water, they obtain water. As a result, they gave the tributary the name Piungan River, and gave the hamlet its current name of Piungan. A total of fifteen individuals, drawn from the Malay, Iban, and Chinese tribes, call Kampong Piungan home. There are only four dwellings in this community. In this village, there are some people who have jobs in the public and private sectors. There are also those who work as farmers and fisherman, and some of them are self-employed now that they have left their government jobs.

=== Kampong Bang Bulan ===
From the Murut language, Kampung Bang Bulan translates to 'Dalam Bulan' (In the Moon) in Malay; it is approximately 3.4 kilometres (2.1 miles) away from Pekan Bangar. Three tribes; the Malay, Chinese, and Iban, live in this hamlet. There are just 7 dwellings in this community, which has fifteen residents. The population of Kampong Bang Bulan work as farmers, fisherman, and independent contractors. Two Chinese brothers and sisters who own a shop in this area fix vehicles and outboard motors. Despite having no formal training or education in this industry, these two brothers and sisters have been running their company for more than 30 years. Customers and the general public frequently stop by their workshops to fix vehicles, outboard motors, and other things.

=== Kampong Kinalong ===
Only approximately 2.5 kilometres (1.6 miles) separate Kampong Kinalong from Pekan Bangar. Only 17 families and 7 dwellings make up the majority of the village's population. The name of the community, Kampong Kinalong, comes from a Chinese legend about a man who once resided in a neighbourhood next to a creek. Then Kampong Kinalong and Kinalong emerged as the names of the tributary and its source, respectively. There is a two-story house in the town that is now being used as a homestay, with nightly prices starting at B$35.00. The ground floor of this boarding house, which belonged to Awang Haji Aji bin Haji Nokman, also has a restaurant for the use of the residents and the general public.

=== Kampong Semamang ===
Approximately 1 kilometre (0.62 miles) separates Bangar Town from Kampung Semamang. There are just two dwellings in this settlement, which is home to two families. There is a Vehicle Oil Sales Station (Cooperative Company) for Temburong District in Kampong Semamang. The ancient people's tales do not reveal where the name Kampong Semamang came from. Tanah Perkuburan Semamang, the largest Muslim cemetery in Temburong District, is located in this settlement.

== Economy ==
The women in Mukim Bangar are actively working on several products under the Satu Kampung Satu Produk (1K1P) programme, including the processing of salted eggs run by the Women's Bureau of the Village Consultative Council (MPK) of Puni and Ujong Jalan; the manufacturing of Karipap Mini MPK Menengah which is worked on as a result of the active involvement of the MPK Menengah Women's Bureau, in addition to other enterprises such as handicrafts and so on. Penghulu of Mukim Bangar, Awang Haji Abdul Rahman on an interview, expressed the hope that the residents of Mukim Bangar will work together and unite towards improving and developing the mukim in particular and the Temburong District in general from time to time. He also hopes that the residents of Mukim Bangar will continue to commit to further expand the production of 1K1P under the catchment area of Mukim Bangar to help the government generate the economy in this country.

== Infrastructure ==
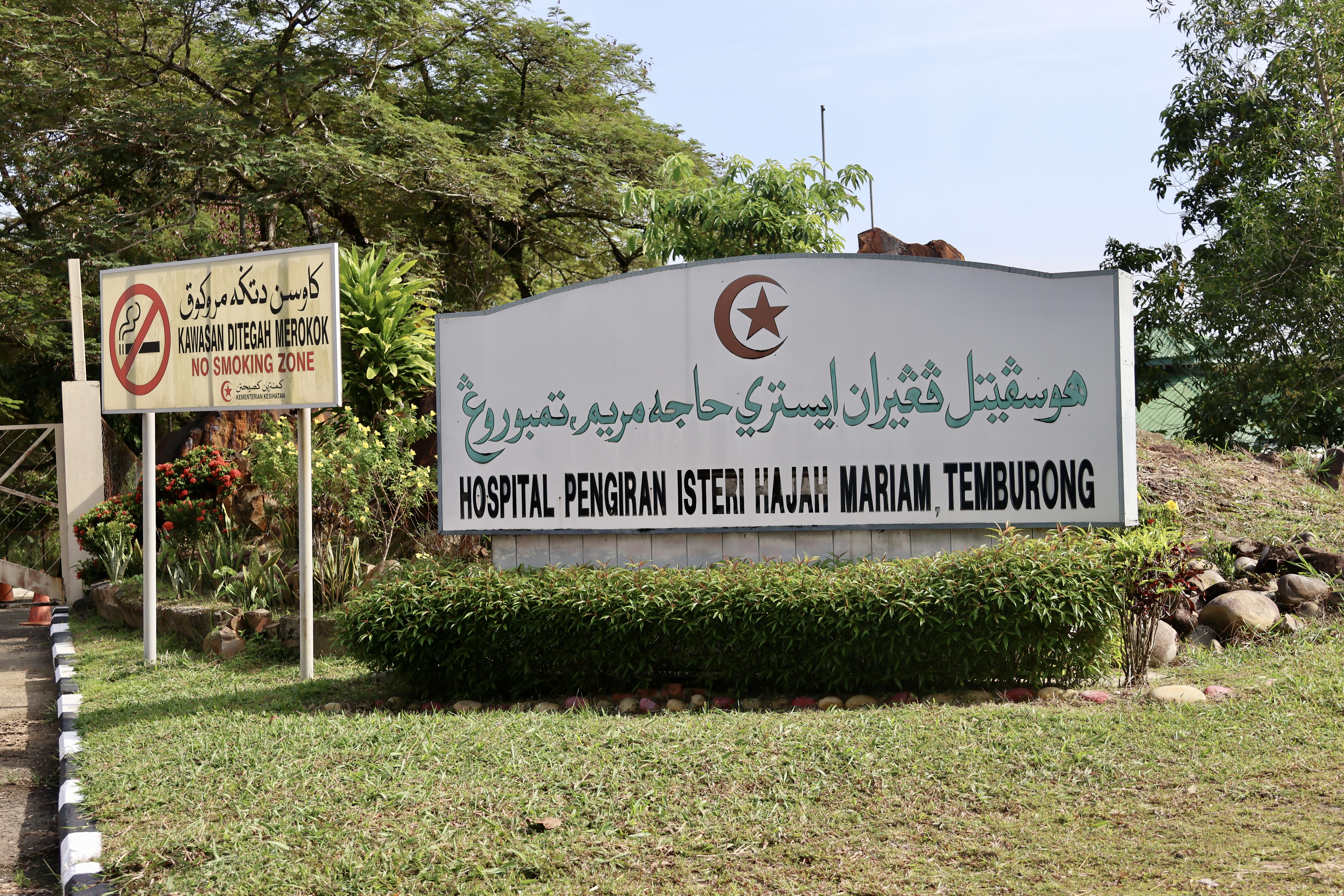
Pengiran Isteri Hajjah Mariam Hospital.

The mukim is not left behind to receive the current of development provided by the government. This can be seen by the construction of several government buildings to further smooth the affairs of management and administration in this district rich in tropical rainforest, where in Mukim Bangar is located Pekan Bangar which is the District Administration Centre, and functions as a stopover and communication centre. In addition, the complex of government buildings is also located in Pekan Bangar, in addition to facilitating the affairs and administration of the residents in this district. This makes Mukim Bangar a relatively busy sub-district, with various activities compared to other sub-districts in Temburong District. Bangar Town Community Hall Complex was also built in Mukim Bangar, which is often used to hold various social activities and official and unofficial events in this district, in addition to several town halls in the villages under the catchment of Mukim Bangar.

Mukim Bangar is also home to shops that drives the economy in this area, including the Main Bumiputera Complex Pekan Bangar, Tamu Muhibbah, with a variety of tastes and a row of shops that have long existed in Pekan Bangar to make it easier for the residents of this district to get their daily needs. To ensure the development of youth education, the Ministry of Education has built two primary schools in the mukim, namely Puni Primary School and Sultan Hassan Bangar Primary School. In addition, there are two private schools in Mukim Bangar, namely Suria Jaya School and Pai Yuek School. (Note: Pai Yuek Secondary School, located in Kampung Batang Tuau, was established in 1950 by Tan Lian Kiat to provide Mandarin language and Chinese cultural education to local Chinese children. Initially built with wooden walls and a zinc roof, the school started with only 10 students. It relocated to its current site in 2012, covering 1.5 acres, with facilities such as classrooms, a hall, a science lab, a computer room, and a library. The school charges B$385 per month, and has received donations of teaching equipment from the Tiong Hua community. With 84 students from various ethnic groups and 13 teachers, the school follows the Ministry of Education's curriculum, offering subjects including Mathematics, English, Science, Malay, and Chinese Language.) While the only high school in this district, Sultan Hassan Bangar High School was also built in Mukim Bangar. Meanwhile, in order to ensure that the teachings of Islam are not ignored, several mosques and religious schools were also built.

== Border crossings ==
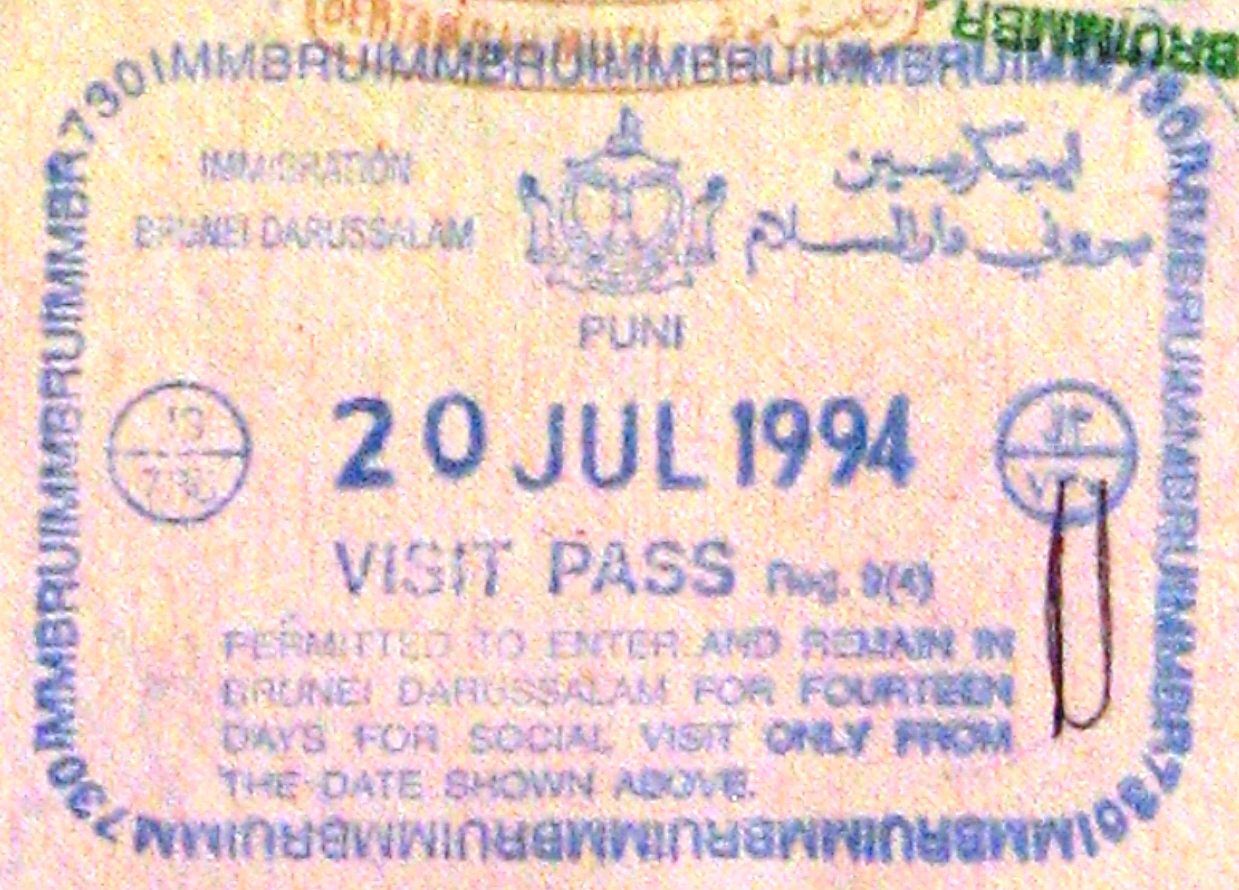
Old Brunei entry stamp from the Puni border checkpoint before the opening of the Ujung Jalan checkpoint.

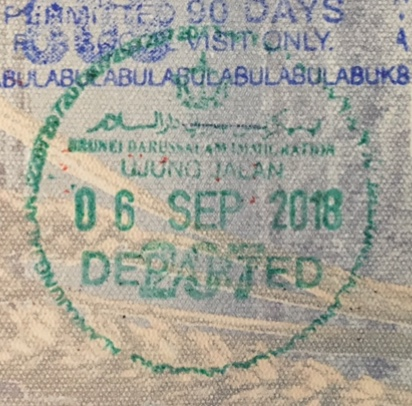
Ujung Jalan checkpoint exit stamp.

There is a road border crossing into Malaysia's Sarawak state at Kampung Ujung Jalan, 5 kilometres (3.1 miles) from Bangar town. Previously, the crossing had to be done by vehicular ferry across the Pandaruan River which forms the Brunei-Malaysia border. However, a Malaysia-Brunei Friendship Bridge has been constructed, and opened to vehicular traffic on 8 December 2013.

Both Brunei and Malaysia have constructed new customs, immigration and quarantine checkpoints at locations either side of the crossing. The Brunei checkpoint is called the Ujung Jalan Immigration Checkpoint. Before the construction of the bridge, the Brunei customs, immigration and quarantine checkpoint was housed in a wooden building in Kampung Puni, 500 metres (0.31 miles) from the ferry landing towards Bangar, while Malaysian customs and immigration procedures had to be carried out at Limbang wharf in Limbang, 15 kilometres (9.3 miles) away as there was no checkpoint at Pandaruan.

== Notable people ==
- Mohammad Abdul Rahman (born 1948), a politician and writer
- Haimie Abdullah Nyaring (born 1998), a footballer for DPMM FC
