= Kampong Rataie =

Village in Brunei

Kampong Rataie کامڤوڠ راتاءي
- Village
- Location in Brunei
- Coordinates: 4°39′15″N 115°03′46″E
- Country: Brunei
- District: Temburong
- Mukim: Bokok

Government
  - Village head: Khairul Anwar Juma'at; Abdul Aziz Yusoff (RPN)

Population (2021)
  - Total: 2,833
- Time zone: UTC+8 (BNT)
- Postcode: PE2751

Kampong Rataie is a village in Temburong District, Brunei. The population was 2,833 in 2021. It is one of the villages within Mukim Bokok. The village encompasses the public housing estates STKRJ Kampong Rataie and RPN Kampong Rataie. The postcode is PE2751.

== Economy ==
Kampong Rataie produces wooden handicrafts such sticks, tops, sarong pemarang, rosaries, rings, and other items that tourists who visit Temburong District use as mementos. Additionally, they manufacture honey potato chips, honey poppy, as well as several kinds of biscuits and bahulu cakes.

== Infrastructure ==
Rataie Primary School is the village's government primary school.

The village mosque is RPN Kampong Rataie Mosque.
