= Mukim Bokok =

Mukim of Brunei

- Mukim
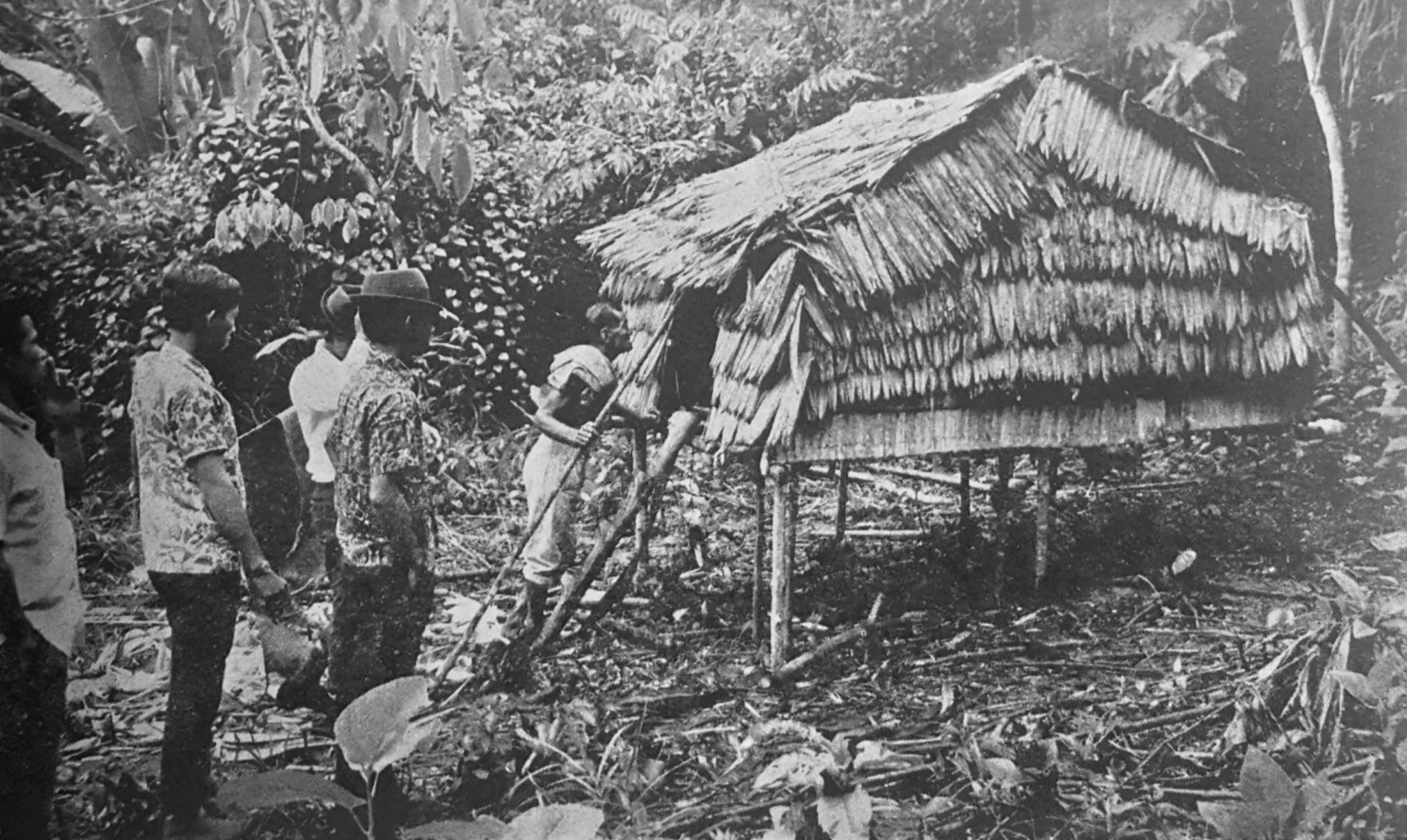
- Kampong Lepong Baru in 1966.

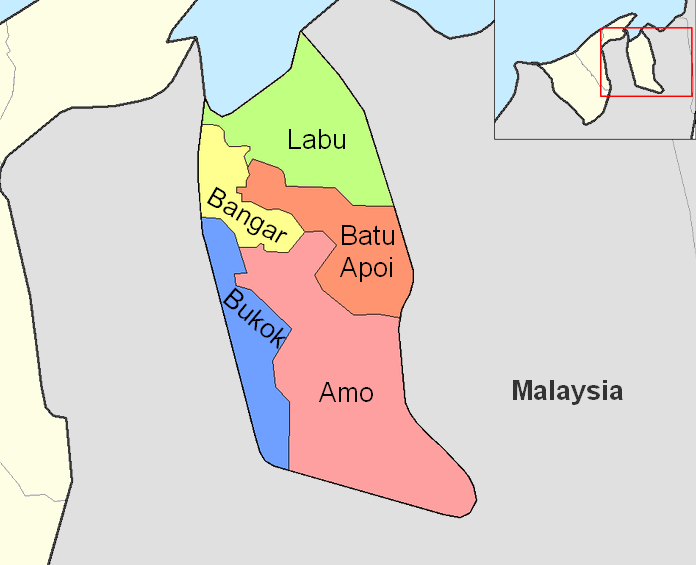
- Bokok is in blue.
- Coordinates: 4°38′43″N 115°03′16″E
- Country: Brunei
- District: Temburong

Government
  - Penghulu: Suhaili Badas

Area
  - Total: 136 km^{2} (53 sq mi)

Population (2021)
  - Total: 3,812
  - Density: 28.0/km^{2} (72.6/sq mi)
- Time zone: UTC+8 (BNT)
- Postcode: PExx51

Mukim Bokok is a mukim in Temburong District, Brunei. It has an area of 136 square kilometres (53 sq mi); as of 2021, the population was 3,812.

== Etymology ==
The mukim could be named after a village it encompasses, Kampong Bokok. Mukim Bokok's historical name is the reason it is known as "Bokok." There are two tales concerning how the name "Bokok" came to be, according to the village elders. The first comes from Sungai Bokok (Bokok River), a little river that empties into the Rataie River. Second, it originates from takuyung (Potamides cerithium) known as takuyung bakak in Murut. Due to its form, which resembles a human bending over, Malaysians commonly refer to it as Bokok.

== Geography ==
The mukim is located in the west of the Temburong District to the south, bordering Mukim Bangar to the north-east, Mukim Amo to the east, and the Malaysian state of Sarawak to the south and west.

== Demographics ==
As of 2021 census, the population was 3,812 with 51.5% males and 48.5% females. The mukim had 797 households occupying 767 dwellings. The entire population lived in rural areas. According to statistical statistics provided by the penghulu in 2018, the total population by race as a whole consists of the Malay race totaling 2,746 people, the Murut tribe 55 people, the Iban tribe 688 people, the Chinese race 20 people and followed by other races/tribes which are 68 people.

== Administration ==
As of 2021, the mukim comprised the following villages:

Settlements	Population (2021)	Ketua kampung (2024)
Kampong Bakarut	42	—N/a
Kampong Belais Besar (Note: Kampong Belais Besar and Kampong Belais Kecil are collectively known as Kampong Belais.)	92	Mohammad Afnan bin Haji Gapor
Kampong Belais Kecil	17	Mohammad Afnan bin Haji Gapor
Kampong Buda-Buda (Note: Kampong Belais and Kampong Buda-Buda are administered under one village head.)	94	Mohammad Afnan bin Haji Gapor
Kampong Bokok	160	Abdullah bin Haji Mahmood
Kampong Kenua	114	—N/a
Kampong Lepong (Note: Formerly administered as two villages i.e. Kampong Lepong Baru and Kampong Lepong Lama)	12	Ambol Anak Bakit
Kampong Maniup (Note: Also spelt "Meniup")	32	—N/a
Kampong Paya Bagangan	62	—N/a
Kampong Rataie	2,833	Khairul Anwar bin Haji Juma'at
RPN Rataie	2,833	Abdul Aziz bin Haji Mohd Yusoff
Kampong Semabat	95	—N/a
Kampong Simbatang (Note: Not to be confused with the village of the same name in Mukim Batu Apoi)	58	—N/a
Kampong Temada	90	—N/a

== Villages ==
=== Kampong Bokok ===
The late Pengiran Bendahara Pengiran Muda Haji Hashim gave the first Kampong Bokok mosque its formal opening on 21 June 1957. The land for this mosque was given to the Kampong Bokok locals by Awang Aji bin Dollah and Awang Ahmad bin Haji Malik. Additionally, the village has a primary school named Bokok Primary School. In 2008, the village was one of the most affected settlements by the sudden flood, with 55 homes ruined. Kampong Bokok produces traditional food with various flavors such as kuih bahulu and various types of Sapit. In addition, the residents of Kampong Bokok also have Kemajuan Pertanian Luar Bandar (KPLB) by producing several types of local fruit trees.

=== Kampong Belais and Buda-Buda ===
Early in the new millennium, erosion caused a section of road in Temburong, inside the obscure Kampong Belais and Buda-Buda, to give way to the Pandaruan River. The government constructed a sizable retaining wall along the river bank to remedy the issue, which soon had the village's few hundreds of people wondering whether they might construct some form of cottages atop the wall to engage in one of their favorite past times: fishing. Kampong Belais and Buda-Buda produce enterprises such as handicrafts from wood, broiler farming, mushroom cultivation, cluster farms, yam/potato chips, bananas, fried onions and Heritage Park ecotourism as well as fishing and leisure lodges.

Together with the other villagers, a member of the Belais and Buda-Buda Consultative Council proposed to the Temburong District Office to construct the huts, which would also be a tourism attraction. Fishing for udang galah, often known as the big river prawn, was at the heart of their original presentation. The objective of the simple, bamboo or wood houses was to give cover from the sun or rain while fishing. For the public's usage, the villages levied a rent of $1 to $2 per hour. However, the lack of young individuals presents a problem for the little village's hopes of expanding the business. Belais and Buda-Buda's hiking trails and heritage park, have mostly gone ignored in recent years due to the customary preference for youngsters growing up in Temburong to pursue jobs in the capital.

=== Kampong Lepong ===
The origin of the name of the village drives from the clam waters of the Peraduran River during the high tide season, which is called "Lepong" in Iban language. Part of the residents of Kampong Lepong Lama relocated to a new area now called Kampong Lepong Baru. The Yayasan Kampong Lepong Baru donated a 12-doored longhouse and 2 stand-alone houses. Kampong Lepong Baru, which has a population of 353 people, also produces a number of handicraft enterprises from rattan, sumboi-sumboi and bamboo, making swords and knives and also produces fish cakes. In the ecotourism sector, this village also provides two longhouses, the Home Stay Taman Sri Kenangan which is not only for tourists but also for the public who are interested.

One of the other projects managed by the villagers under MPK Lepong Baru is the Projek Pertanian Sekampung (Village Agriculture Project). The project was carried out in response to the call of the Sultan of Brunei for the people and residents of this country to be active in the field of agriculture. The project focuses on local fruit crops in addition to side crops as needed, with the aim, among other things, for the villagers to get involved in the field of agriculture, especially in cultivating local fruit crops. With an area of 40 hectares, the project has the objective of giving encouragement and awareness to the villagers, especially the youth, to be active in the field of agriculture, in addition to being one of the successful producers of agricultural products for the Temburong District. Indirectly, the results of the operation of the project will definitely be one of the sources of income for the villagers involved.

The participation and involvement of the villagers in managing and working on the projects under the 1K1P Program certainly has an impact and benefits the community. By being involved in making these projects a success, it has succeeded in bringing about a change in attitude towards self-reliance and working as a team. In addition, the residents, especially single mothers and the elderly, also have the opportunity to increase their income even in small amounts. The agreement between them also succeeded in improving the image of the village.

=== Kampong Temada ===
The name of the village came from the name of a fruit "Temedak" (cempedak) according to village's folktale, where a forested island with cempedak fruits.

== Economy ==
Mukim Bokok residents work and raise the standard of their lives by engaging in various economic and ecotourism activities such as agricultural enterprises, animal husbandry, confectionery, food, catering companies, handicrafts, running homestays and fishing lodges, in addition to serving the government. These efforts and activities indirectly open job opportunities for village children and can also help the government in overcoming the unemployment problem in this country. This is proven when several villages in Mukim Bokok through the Majlis Perundingan Mukim (MPM) and the Majlis Perundingan Kampung (MPK) each successfully run and manage several enterprises including producing One Village One Product (1K1P) and the tourism sector.
