= Bangar, Brunei =

Town of Temburong District, Brunei

Bangar Pekan Bangar
- Town
- Bangar Town
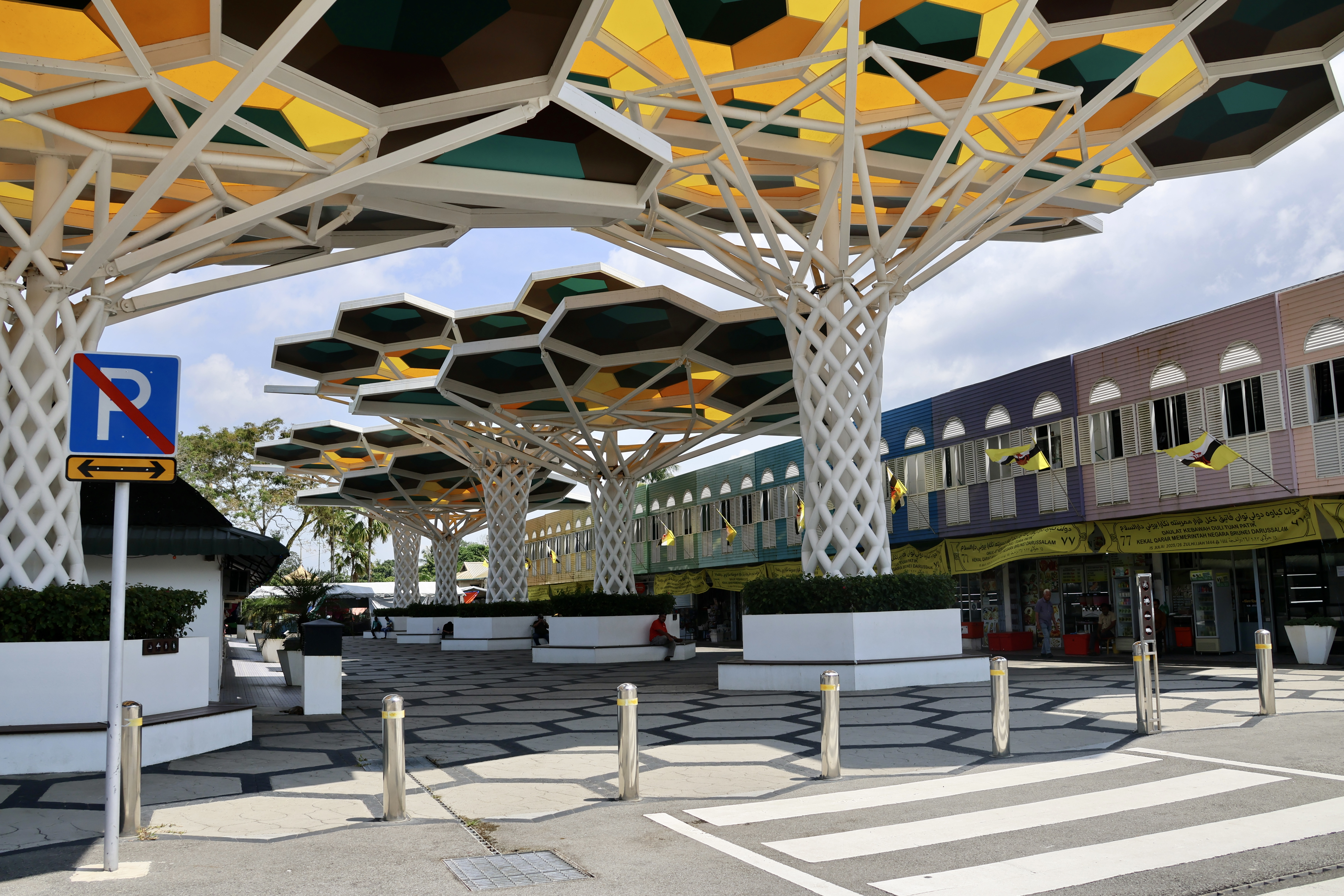
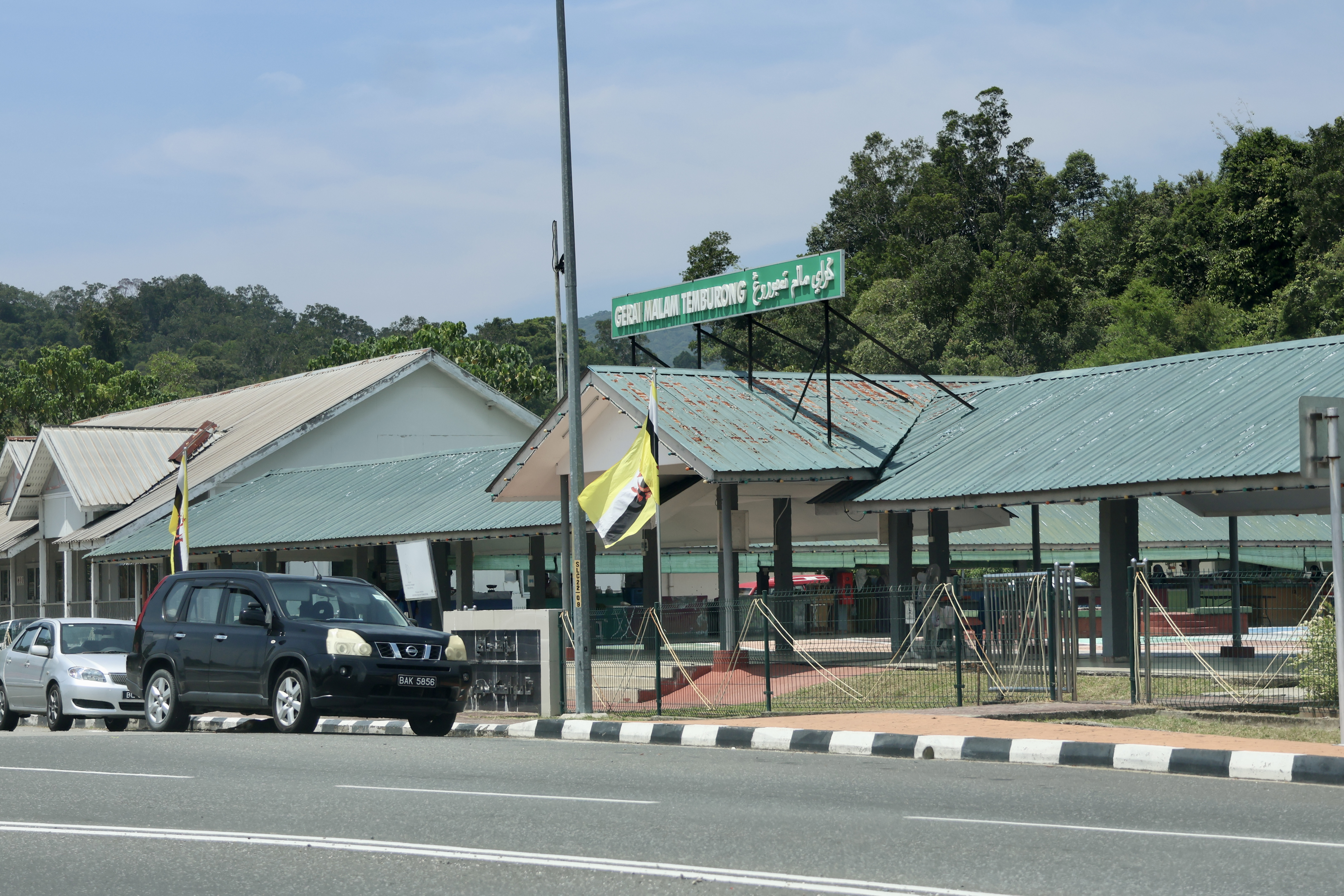
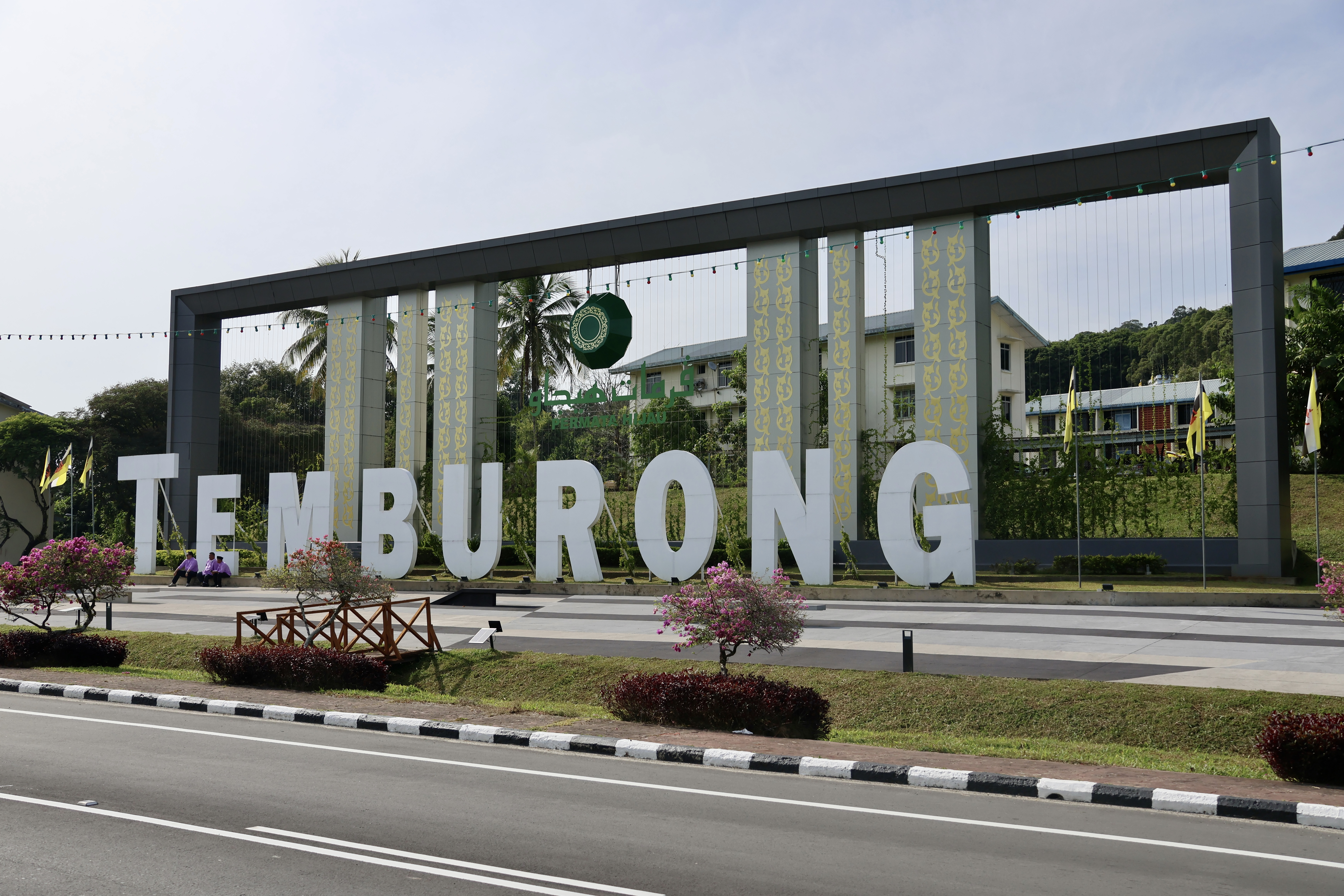
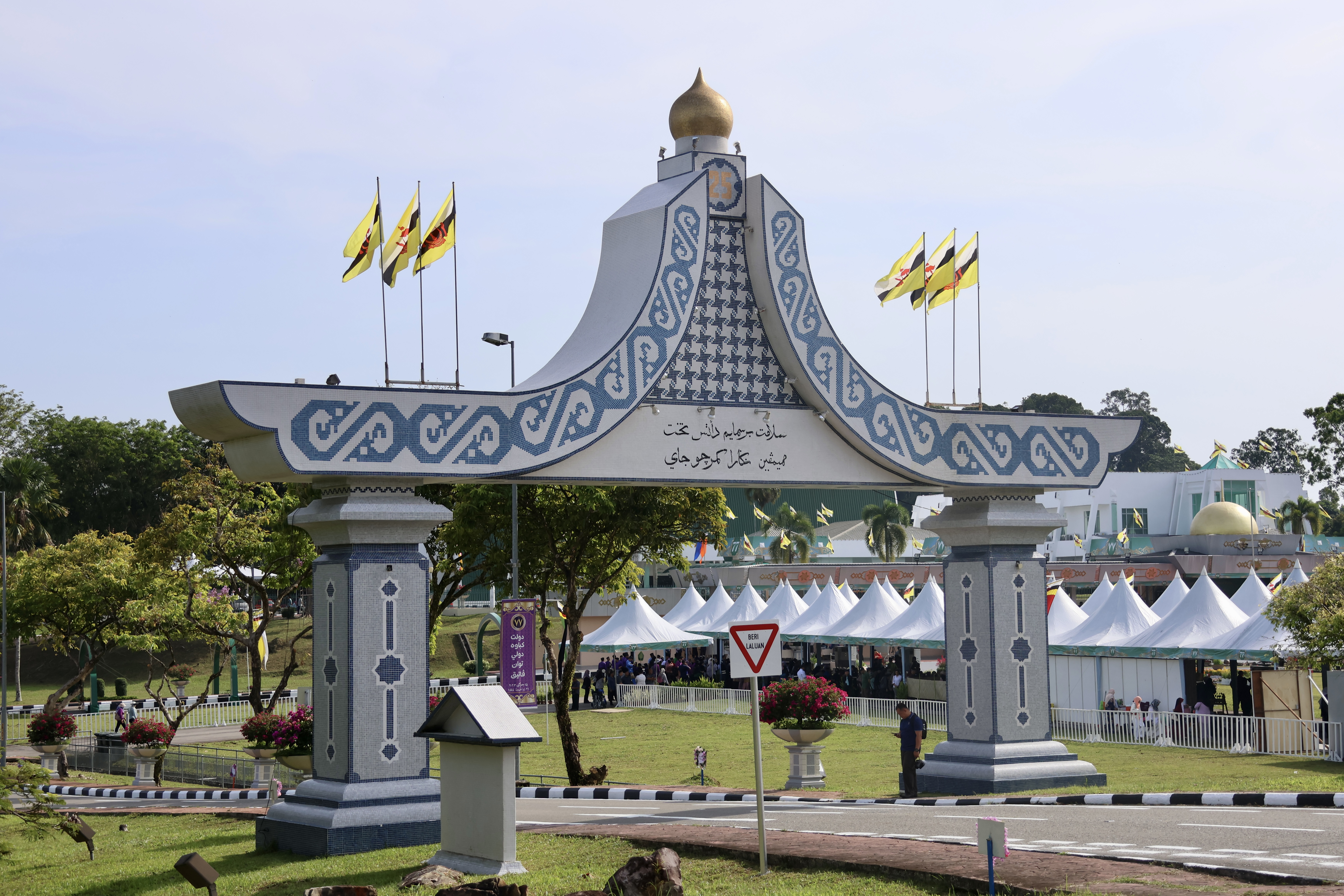
- Clockwise from top left: Bangar town foyer, Temburong market, Temburong sign, Sultan's Silver Jubilee arch

- Location in Brunei
- Coordinates: 4°42′31″N 115°04′26″E
- Country: Brunei
- District: Temburong
- Mukim: Bangar

Population (2021)
  - Total: 451
- Time zone: UTC+8 (BNT)
- Postcode: PA1151

Bangar (Malay pronunciation: [ˈbaŋaɾ]) or officially known as Bangar Town (Malay: Pekan Bangar), is a town and administrative centre of Temburong District, Brunei, an isolated territorial exclave separated from the rest of the country by the Malaysian state of Sarawak. The population of the town proper was 451 in 2021. A number of tiny retail establishments may be found throughout the town, providing everything from clothing to handicrafts to basic needs.

== Etymology ==
The origin name of the town has not been fully established thus several possibilities were opened up. A document published by the Ministry of Culture, Youth and Sports, claimed that the town has a literal descriptive name where Bangar meant a place of smelly dryish deadwood swamp. Meanwhile the Kampong Belingos Protection Council (Majlis Perundingan Kampung Belingos) claimed that the word Bangar is derived from a Murut tribe that means board (papan).

The origin of this term may be traced back to a location where the Murut people formerly donated boards for the construction of homes, huts, and boats close to the Pekan Bangar creek. Thus, Bengar was given to the region. However, the Survey Department at the time altered the name to Bangar. Old Bangar Town and New Bangar Town were the original divisions of Bangar Town. But as of late, that name has been dropped and replaced with Pekan Bangar alone.

== Geography ==
One main road runs through the town, roughly east–west. Headed east of Bangar is Lawas, Sarawak (Malaysia) and to the west is the river crossing to Limbang, Sarawak (Malaysia). The road is the major route to the local quarry where boulders are collected, processed and shipped to stockyards in the capital, Bandar Seri Begawan, for construction companies. The town has a tropical rainforest climate (Af) with heavy to very heavy rainfall year-round.

Climate data for Bangar
Month	Jan	Feb	Mar	Apr	May	Jun	Jul	Aug	Sep	Oct	Nov	Dec	Year
Mean daily maximum °C (°F)	30.1 (86.2)	30.0 (86.0)	30.7 (87.3)	31.4 (88.5)	31.4 (88.5)	31.4 (88.5)	31.1 (88.0)	31.0 (87.8)	31.1 (88.0)	30.8 (87.4)	30.6 (87.1)	30.5 (86.9)	30.8 (87.5)
Daily mean °C (°F)	27.1 (80.8)	27.0 (80.6)	27.4 (81.3)	28.0 (82.4)	28.0 (82.4)	27.9 (82.2)	27.6 (81.7)	27.6 (81.7)	27.6 (81.7)	27.5 (81.5)	27.3 (81.1)	27.3 (81.1)	27.5 (81.5)
Mean daily minimum °C (°F)	24.1 (75.4)	24.1 (75.4)	24.2 (75.6)	24.6 (76.3)	24.7 (76.5)	24.5 (76.1)	24.2 (75.6)	24.2 (75.6)	24.2 (75.6)	24.2 (75.6)	24.1 (75.4)	24.2 (75.6)	24.3 (75.7)
Average rainfall mm (inches)	380 (15.0)	258 (10.2)	258 (10.2)	310 (12.2)	360 (14.2)	278 (10.9)	298 (11.7)	294 (11.6)	385 (15.2)	389 (15.3)	410 (16.1)	392 (15.4)	4,012 (158)
Source: Climate-Data.org

== Administration ==
Bangar is an unincorporated town; it has no municipal body. It is only a village subdivision within Mukim Bangar, a mukim in the district. It has the postcode PA1151. The town serves as a stopover and a communication hub and is the district administrative headquarters.

== Transportation ==
=== Road ===
The Bangar Bridge was built around 1969. It is located across the Temburong River, measuring 300 feet in length and 40 feet in width. Previously, the residents in this area used boats to cross to other regions. Once the bridge was completed and put into use, it became the main connection between the old Bangar Town, new Bangar Town, Labu Estate, and the surrounding areas. The construction of the bridge was part of the National Development Plan.

Driving and going through the Puni Immigration Control Post in order to pass the Malaysian state of Sarawak's border at Limbang. More projects to improve road infrastructures, including those in Temburong District, would be carried out through the National Development Plan 2007–2012. These projects include repairing earth slips at various locations, upgrading high density roads to residential areas, replacing existing wooden bridges, and rehabilitating Jalan Bangar–Puni–Labu.

=== Water ===
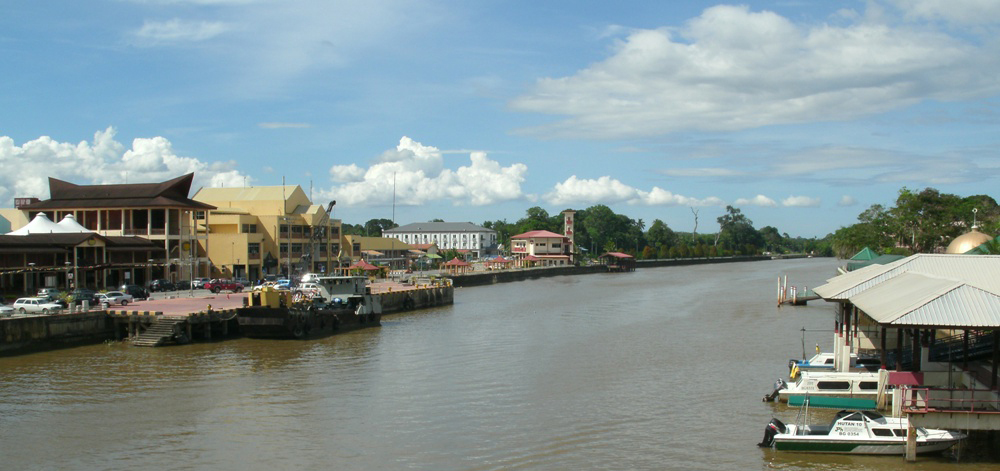
The town sitting along the Temburong River in 2012.

The Pekan Bangar Boat Terminal construction project got under way on 19 June 2008, and it was finished on 19 December 2009. On 7 January 2010, Pehin Dato Haji Awang Abu Bakar, formally opened the terminal. The National Development Plan project that resulted in the construction of this port cost roughly $1.4 million. The route involves taking a boat to Bangar Town via Temburong River, which departs from a dock along the Brunei River. It should take 45 minutes to complete the route.

The Bangar Passenger Jetty Terminal reopened on 13 March 2018, according to the Maritime and Port Authority of Brunei Darussalam (MPABD), and offered boarding and disembarkation services for passenger boats traveling from Bangar to Bandar Seri Begawan.

All passenger services of the jetty permanently closed their operations after Radio Television Brunei (RTB) Temburong District took over the Bangar MPABD building as their new branch once renovation works were completed on 1 March 2022. The Passenger Jetty Terminal continues to exist but remains unused.

=== Air ===
Commercial travellers would have to travel to either Bandar Seri Begawan or Miri to catch a commercial flight. The Bangar Helipad is the sole aviation facility.

== Infrastructure ==
=== Government ===
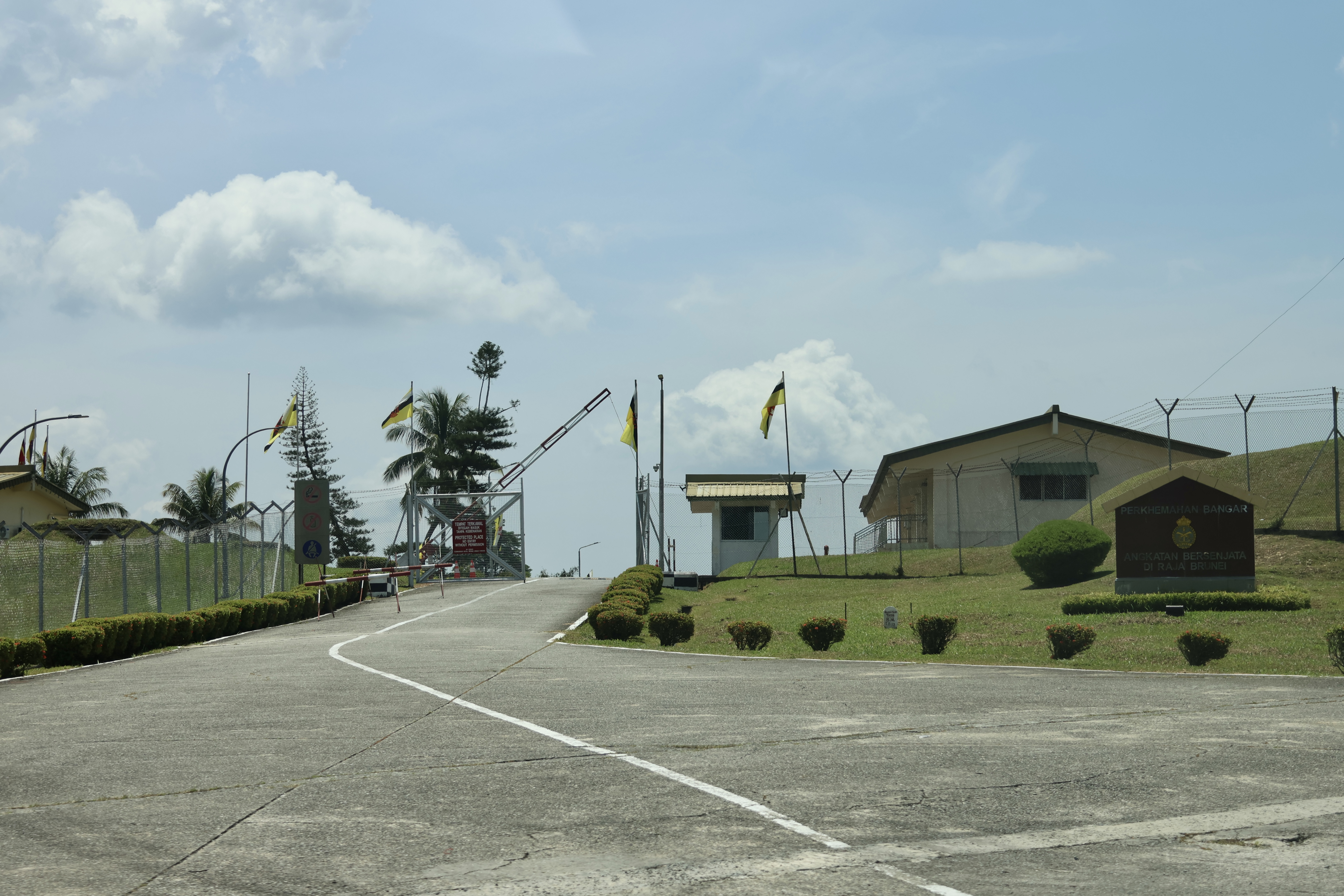
Bangar Camp

Government facilities in Bangar include:

- Bangar Post Office
- Bangar Fire Station is the only fire station in town.
- Temburong Police Station is the only and primary police station in the district.
- Pengiran Isteri Hajah Mariam Hospital serves as the district's primary referral facility, cost about $9.9 million to construct. The citizens have access to more advanced services and a higher quality of health owing to the current medical and healthcare facilities that are available.
- The Government Department Building Complex was built in 1982. The building began to be used in 1984 and the Temburong District Department along with other Departments have moved to the new building until today.
- Bangar Camp (Perkhemahan Bangar) is a military base operated by the Royal Brunei Land Force (RBLF), it has a surau named Surau Al-Quwwah.
- Belalong Community Hall (Dewan Kemasyarakatan Belalong) served as the town's community centre.

=== Commerce ===
Bumiputera Main Complex has a variety of stores are housed on the three floors of this building, including a grocery store, a handicraft and souvenir shop, a cake shop, restaurants, a textile shop, a dhobi, a travel agency, and many more.

Tamu Aneka Temburong is a market to sample regional specialties, which are widely accessible at this dry market in the town across from the Youth Centre.

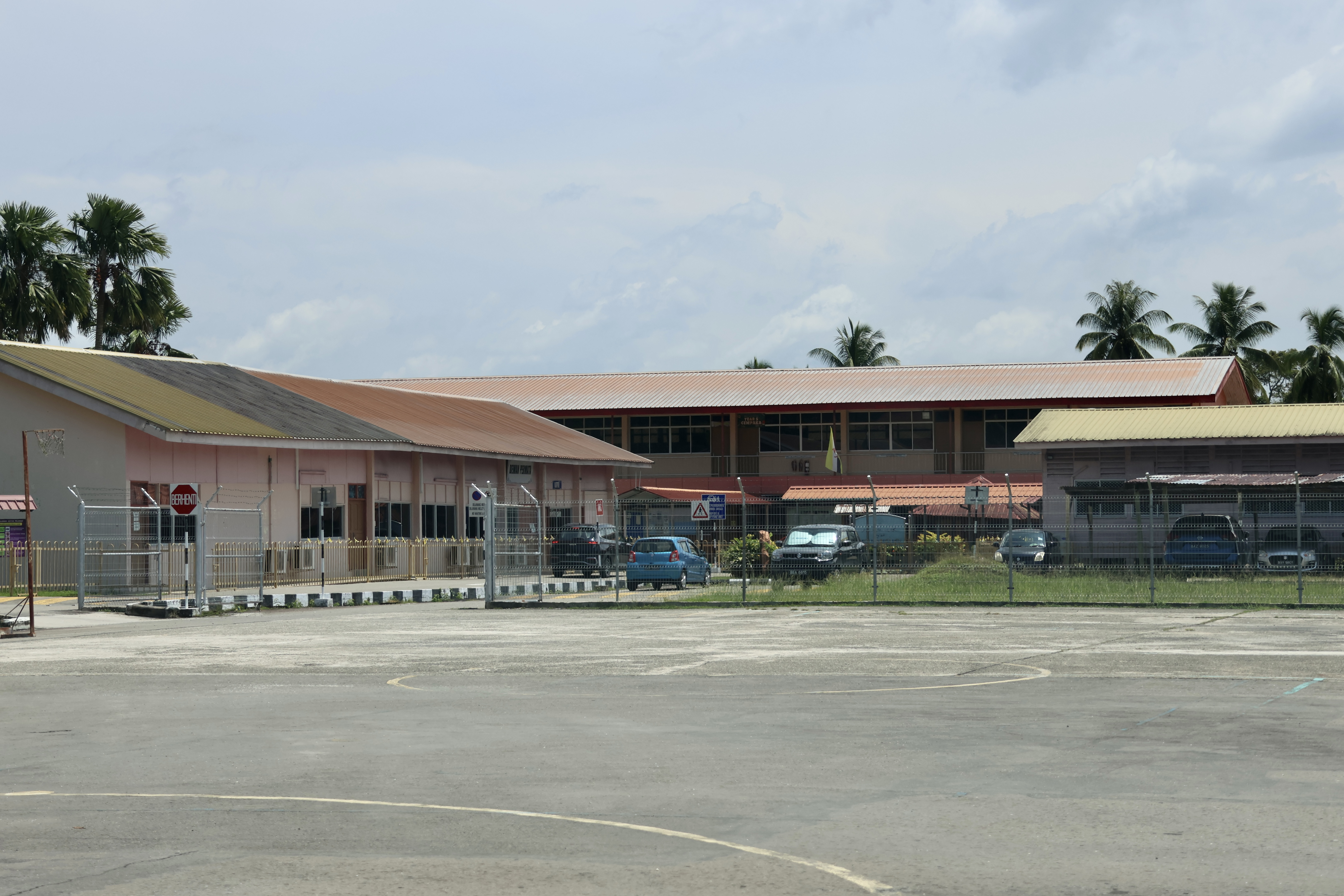
Sultan Hassan Primary School

=== Education ===
Schools in Bangar include:

- Sultan Hassan Primary School (public)
- Sultan Hassan Secondary School (public; closed down and moved to a new building in Kampong Batu Apoi)
- Temburong Arabic School (public)
- Pai Yuek Primary School (private - Chinese)

The Temburong District Library is a public library which sits on Jalan Labu, Eastern half of the town.

=== Tourist attractions ===
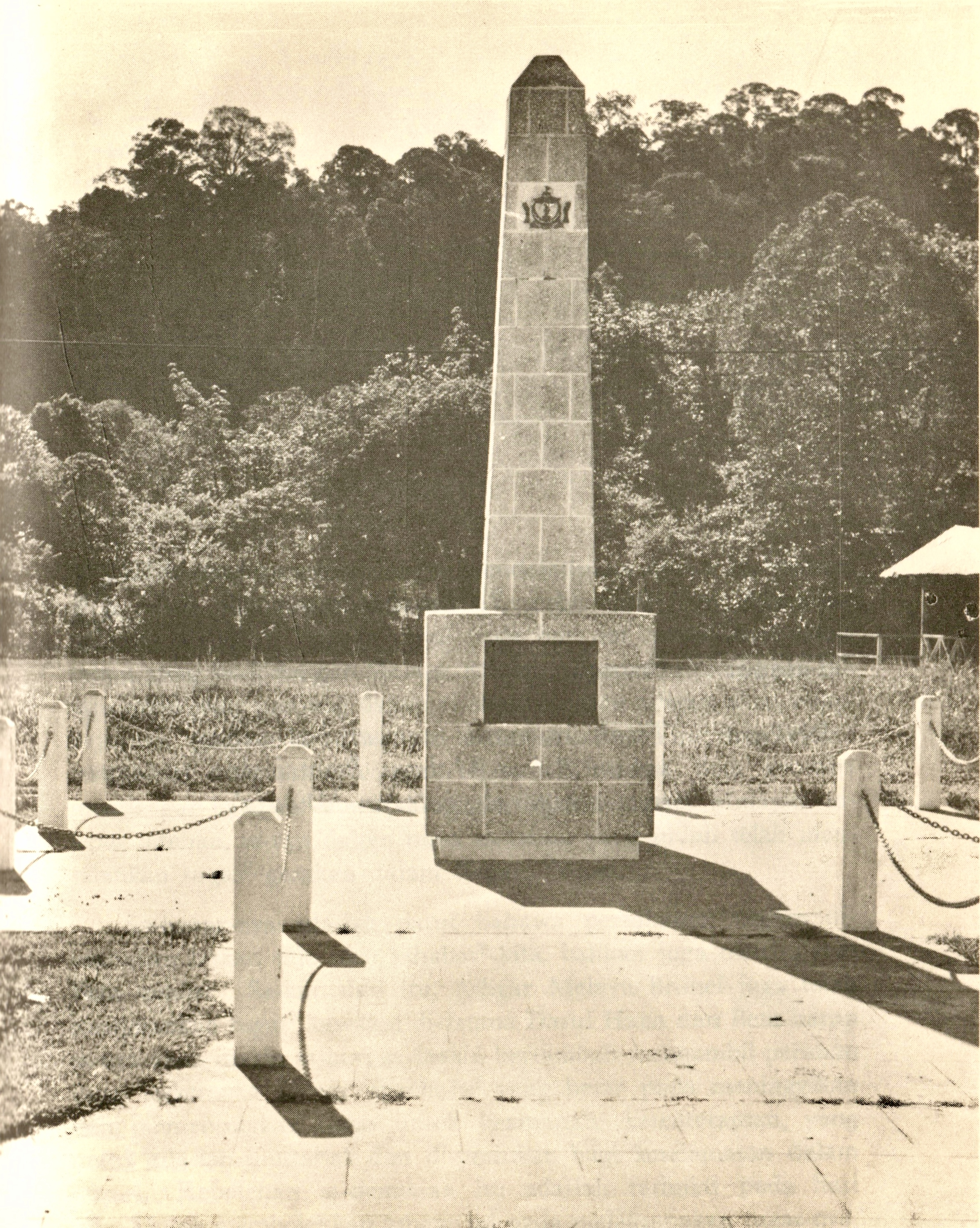
Tugu Peringatan 1962

- Kedai Rakyat Jati is a market place with man-made giant colourful trees.
- Utama Mohammad Salleh Mosque is the only mosque in town. The first Pekan Bangar Mosque was built in 1935.
- The Tugu Peringatan 1962 was constructed around 1963 and is located on the banks of the Temburong River, in the Temburong District. The monument, built entirely from concrete, was inaugurated on 5 January 1964 by Sultan Omar Ali Saifuddien III. It was erected to honour the service and sacrifice of government officials who lost their lives during the 1962 Brunei revolt in the Temburong District. The names of the fallen fighters are inscribed on the monument. (Note: The names on the monument are Pengiran Besar bin Pengiran Kula (acting district officer of Temburong), Sarjan 20, Pengiran Ali bin Pengiran Ghani (Brunei police officer), PC 175, Chen Tong Seng (police officer), Mohamed Hasan bin Ma'un, Sabli bin Ampuan Judah, Abdul Hamid bin Ahmad, and Abdul Ghani bin Abdullah.)
- Old Temburong District Office is planned to be turned into a museum in addition to coming under the Antiquities and Treasure Trove Act 1967. The building was built in the early 1950s. When it was established, this building was used and shared with several other government agencies such as the telecom office, the post office, the customs and excise office and a court room and land transport office. Since this building is used together with other government departments, the building was named the Temburong District Government Office Building.
- The entrance arch to the community hall complex is located at the main junction of Jalan Labu. Constructed entirely from blue and white concrete, this arch was donated by local residents and entrepreneurs (Note: Haji Salleh bin Ampuan Haji Judah and Ang Ping Hui) in celebration of the silver jubilee of Sultan Hassanal Bolkiah on 5 October 1992. The design of the arch incorporates Islamic motifs, elements of traditional Malay culture, and symbols of competitiveness in business.
- Temburong Permata Hijau sign

=== Recreation and sports ===
- Temburong Youth Centre
- Festival Park (Taman Perayaan) is a recreational park with a playground and a hiking trail.
- Kuala Belalong Mini Park

== Gallery ==
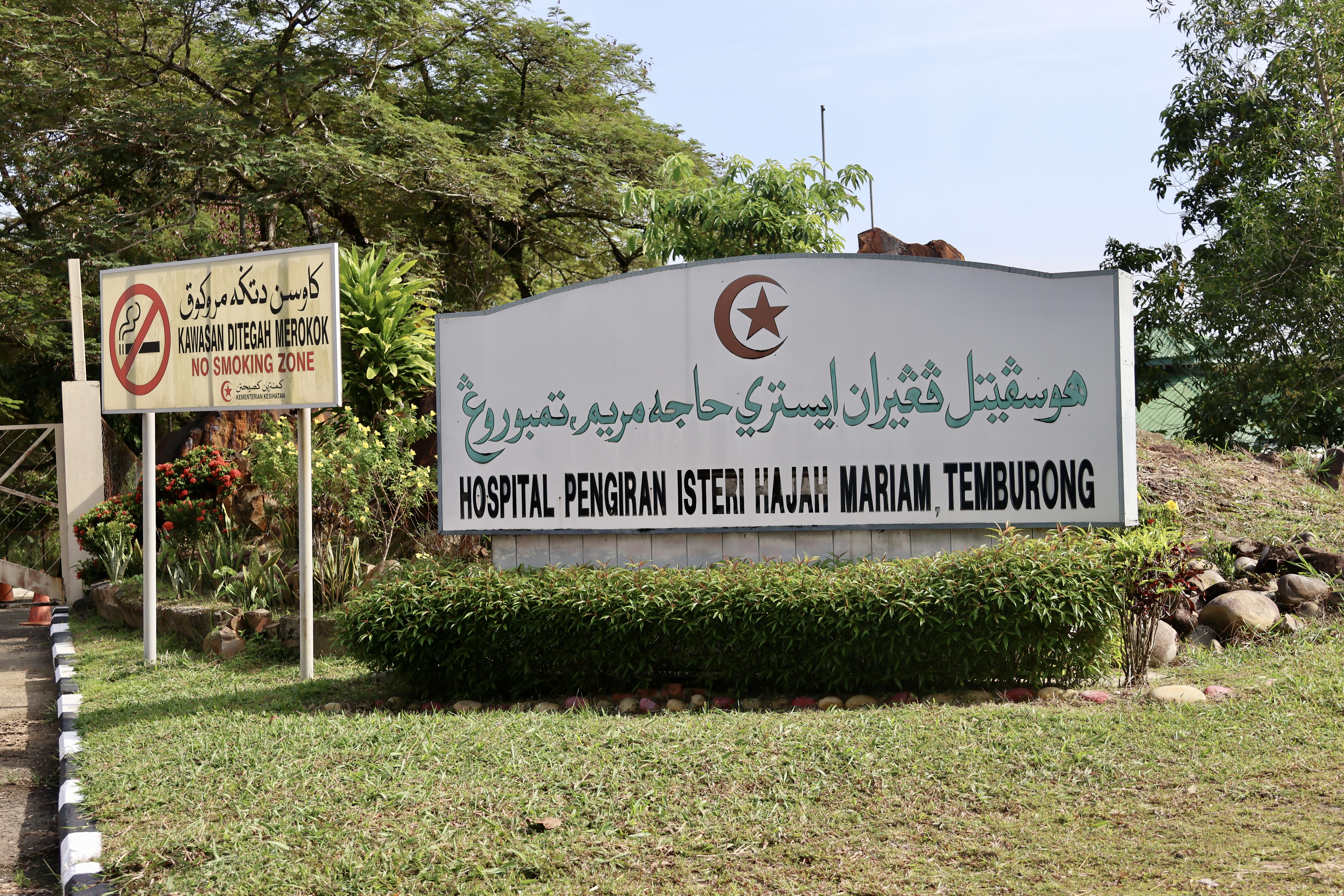
Pengiran Isteri Hajah Mariam Hospital

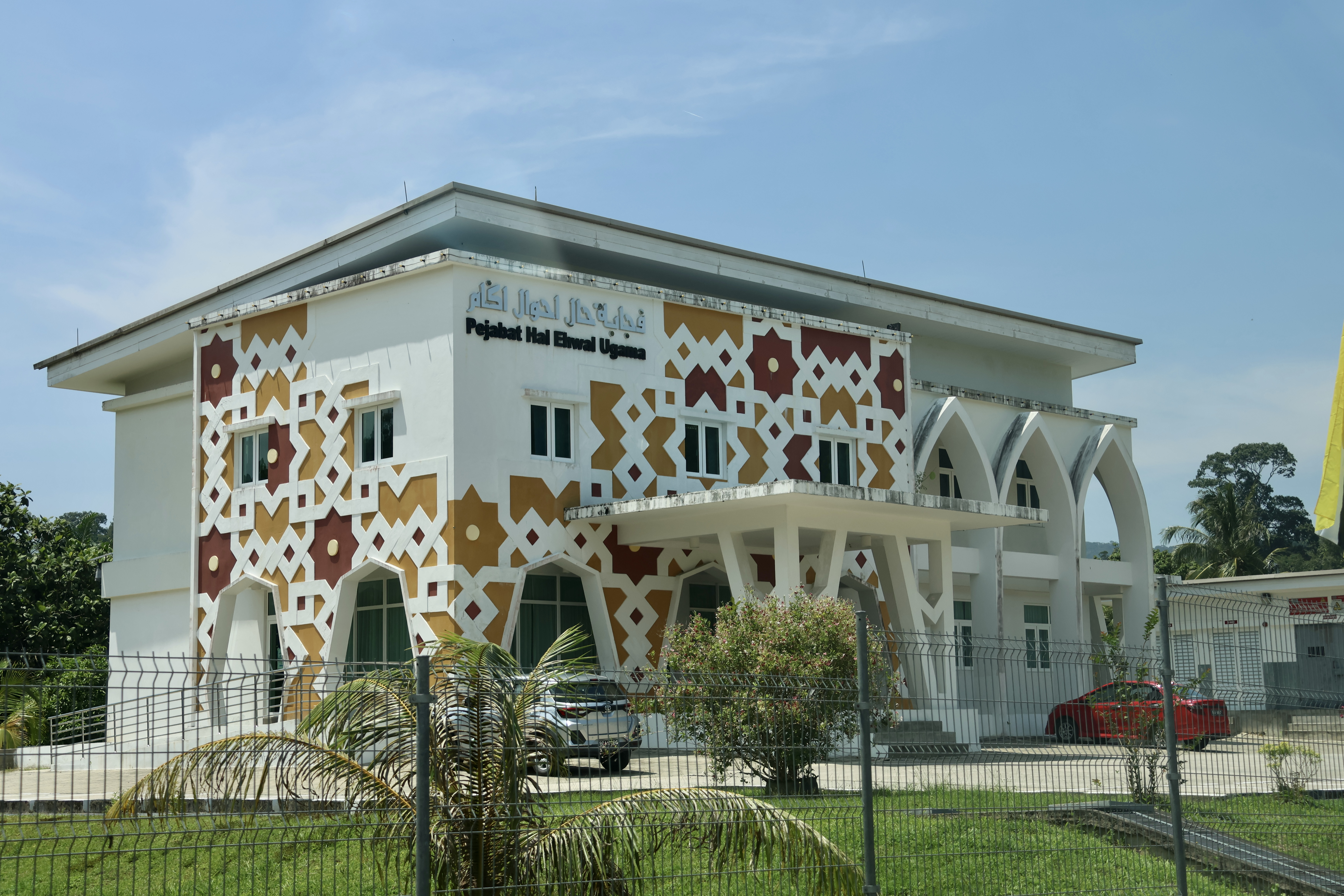
Religious Affairs Department

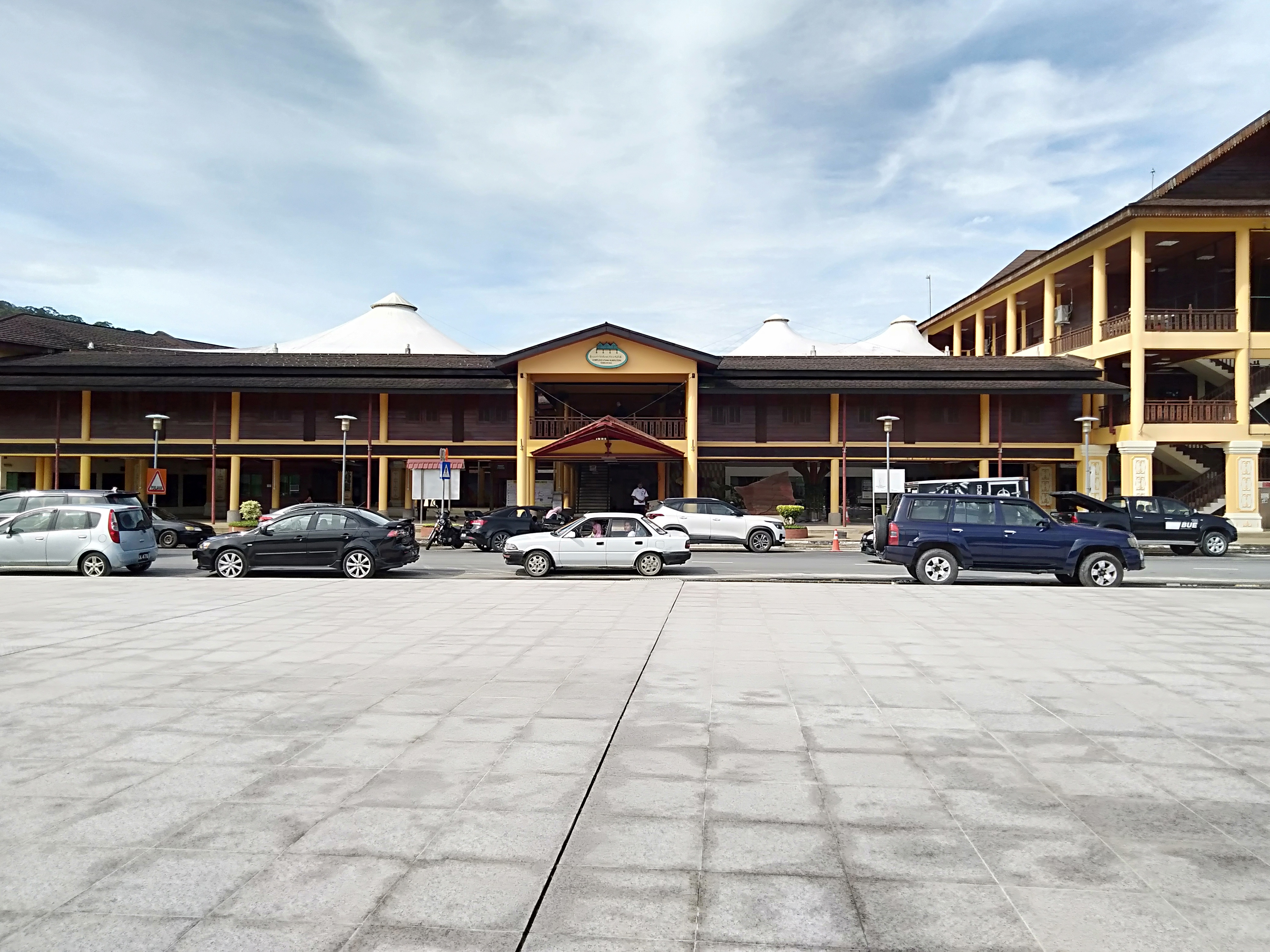
Bumiputera Main Complex

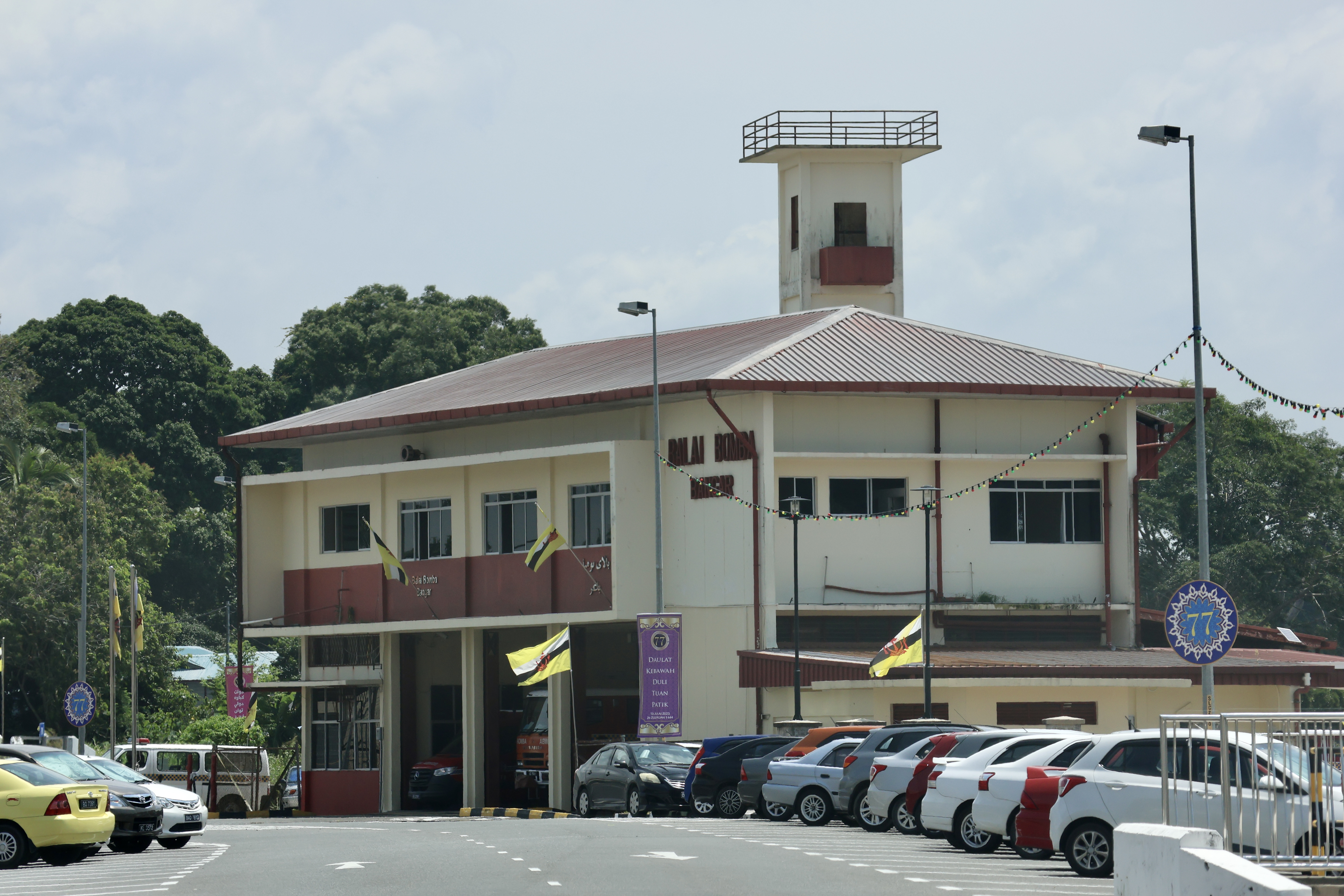
Bangar Fire Station

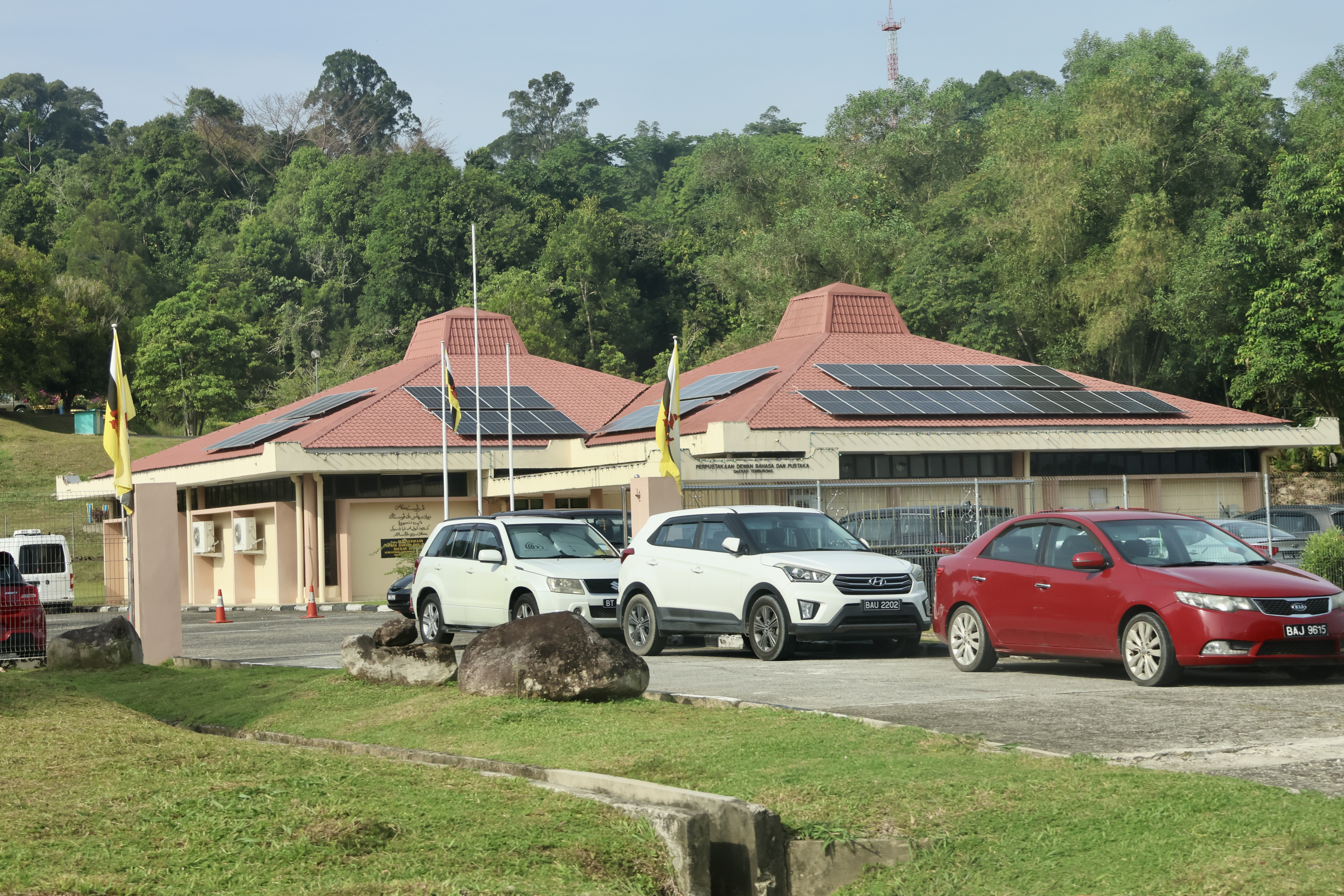
Temburong District Library

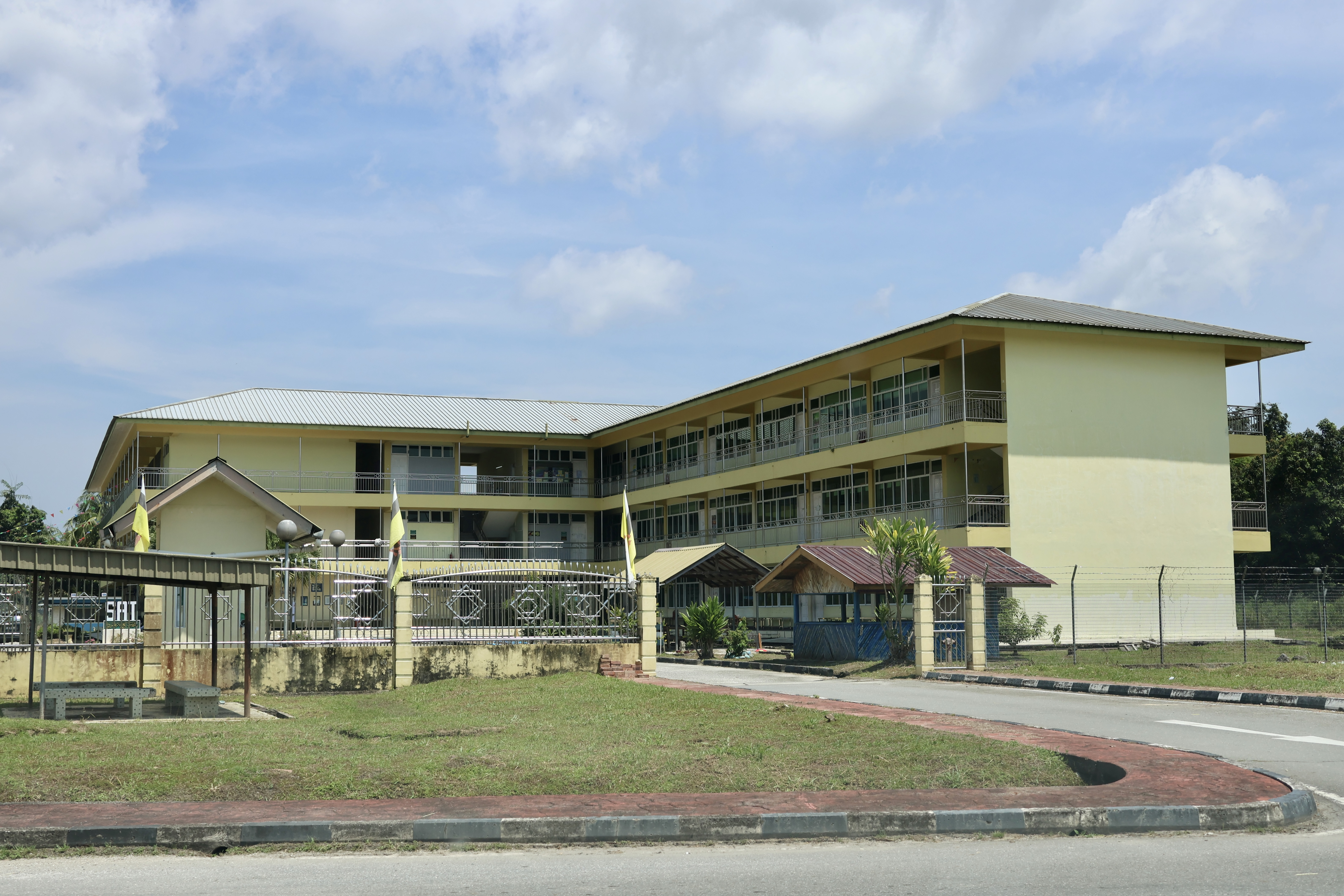
Temburong Arabic School

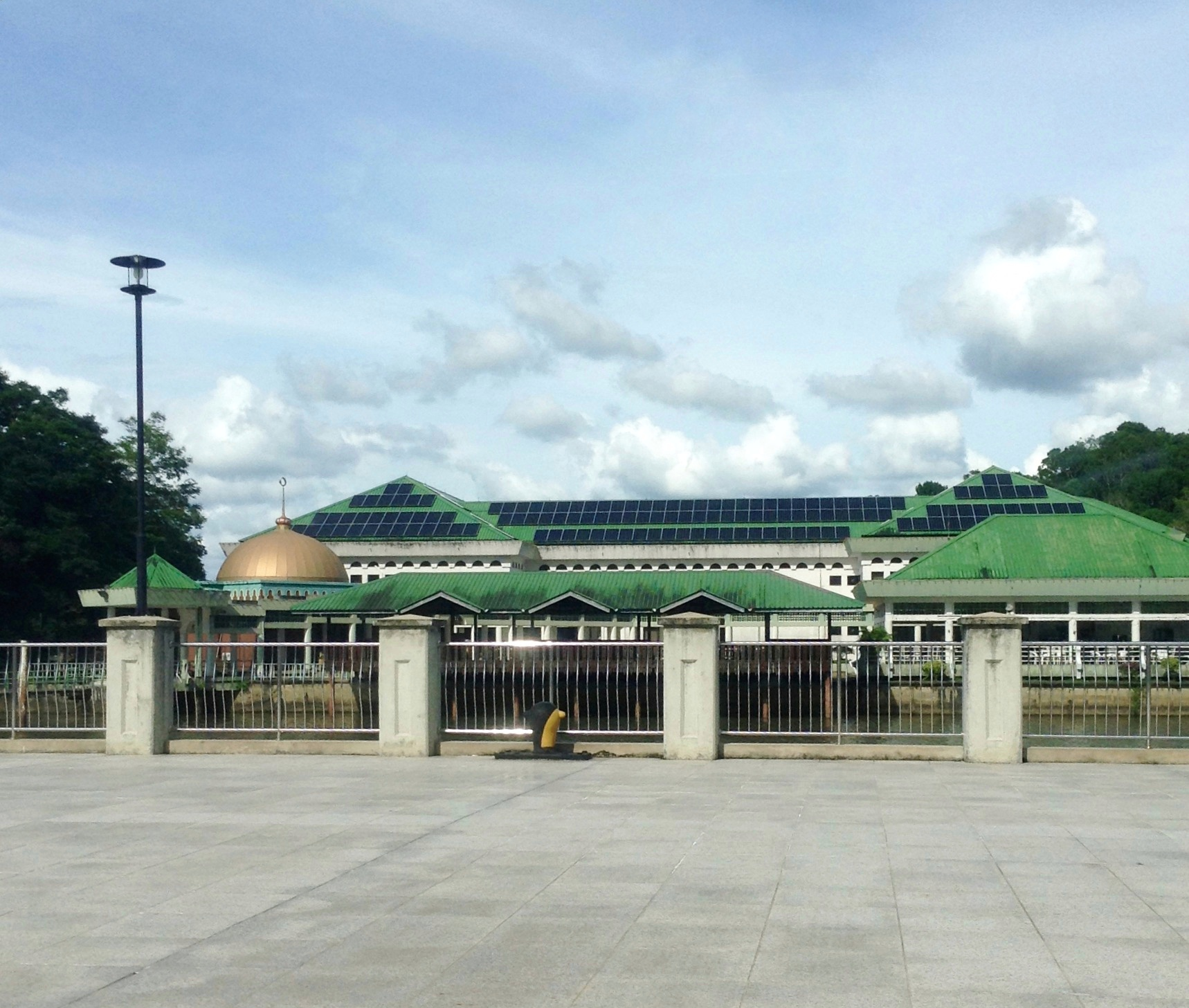
Government Department Building Complex
