= Postcodes in Brunei =

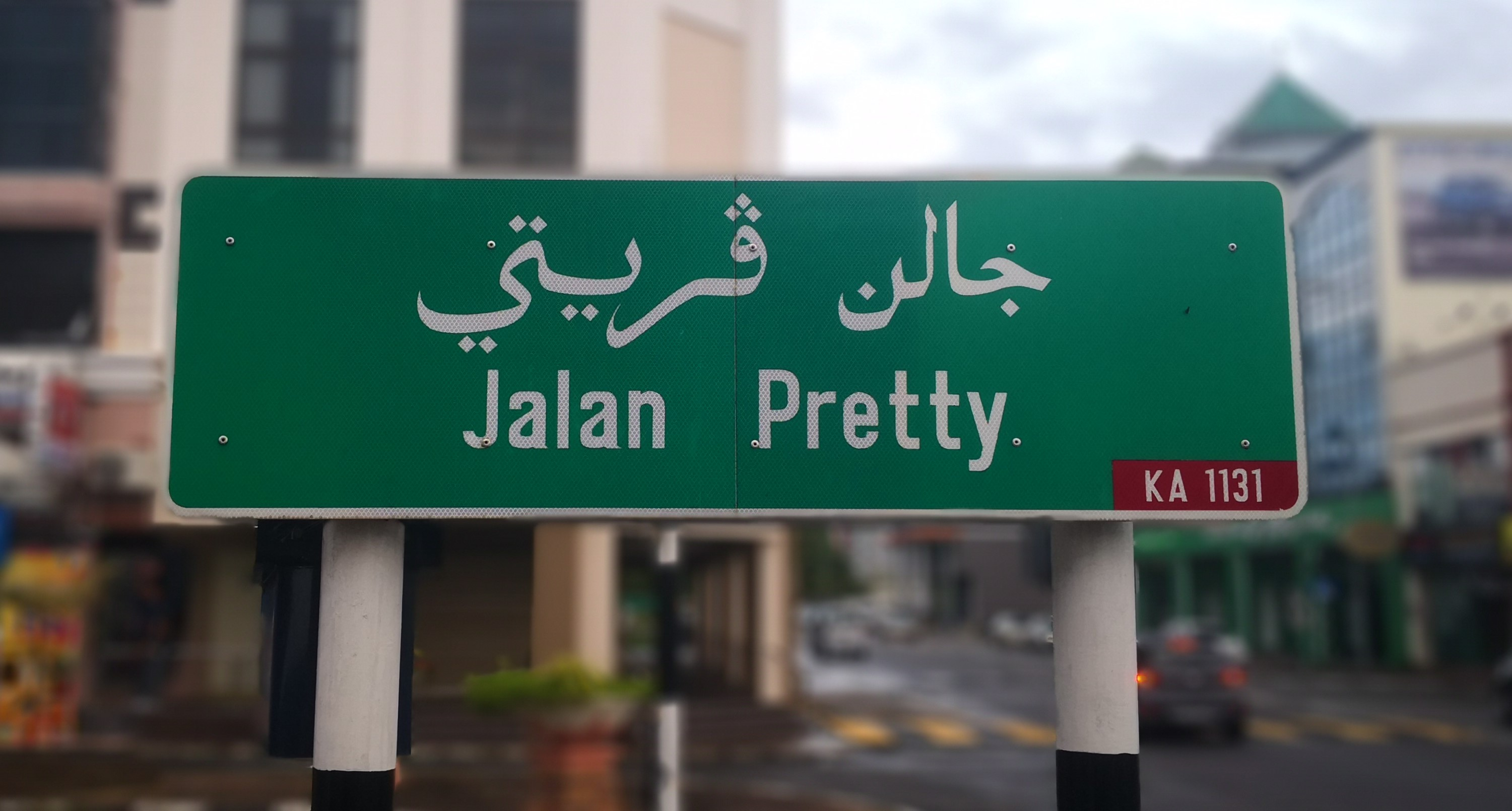
Street sign of Jalan Pretty in Kuala Belait, Brunei Darussalam; its postcode KA1131 is displayed on the lower-right corner.

Postal codes in Brunei Darussalam are known as postcodes (Malay: poskod), and they are alphanumeric; consisting of two letters followed by four digits. Postcodes in Brunei are issued by the Postal Services Department, a government department under the Ministry of Communications.

== Format ==
A Bruneian postcode has six characters, consisting of two uppercase letters and immediately followed by four digits (numbers). Examples of postcodes are BB3713, which represents the postcode area Anggerek Desa; KB4533 which represents Panaga; and BA2110 which represents Jabatan Hal Ehwal Masjid, or the Department of Mosque Affairs.

== Allocation ==
The components of a postcode comprises four types of codes. They are specifically represented by their district (Malay: daerah), then it mukim (sub-district), and then villages and post offices.

=== Districts ===
The first of the two postcode letters of the denotes the district, which corresponds to the name of the specific districts of Brunei.

code	district (daerah)
B	Brunei-Muara
K	Belait
T	Tutong
P	Temburong

=== Mukims ===
The second letter denotes the mukim code, corresponding directly to the mukims or sub-districts of Brunei, the country's second-level administrative divisions.

=== Villages ===
Following the two letters, the first two number digits represent the village code. Usually, it corresponds directly to the villages (Malay: kampung), the country's third- and lowest-level administrative divisions. However, some larger villages may have more than one postcode area. Some postcode areas may also represent defunct villages, or villages which have been subsumed under other nearby villages.

=== Post offices ===
The last two digits represent the post office code, which generally correspond to the post office of, or nearest to, the village or mukim. A few may also correspond to the function of the place, and this exclusively refers to government ministries or departments. They have postcodes with the last digit '0'. One example is BA2110, which represents the Department of Mosque Affairs, a government department under the Ministry of Religious Affairs.

== Postcodes ==
A complete postcode represents either an area or a government agency.

=== Area postcode ===
An area postcode is usually equivalent to the village sub-division; the postcode TB1741 corresponds directly the whole area which constitutes Sinaut, a village in Tutong District. However, a few postcodes may represent specific parts of a village. For example, although the postcode for Rataie, a village in Temburong District, is PE2751, the areas in it which constitute the Rancangan Perpindahan Negara- and Skim Tanah Kurnia Rakyat Jati-type public housing have separate postcodes of PE2951 and PE3151 respectively.

Some postcodes may also represent defunct villages, and villages which have been subsumed other nearby villages. Bangar, the administrative town of Temburong District, is also a village sub-division. However, it has two postcodes: PA1151 and PE1351, which constitute the postcode areas 'Pekan Bangar Lama' and 'Pekan Bangar' respectively. This means that the Bangar area once had two separate village sub-divisions, but have since been combined into the current Bangar sub-division.

A few postcodes may represent areas that are officially village sub-divisions, but are not sufficiently functioning as such. For example, BB2513 represents the Old Airport, mainly an administrative area where many government departments are located.

=== Government postcode ===
A few postcodes are exclusively for government agencies, instead of areas. All postcodes with the last digit '0' constitute government ministries or departments. One example is BB3510, which is for Bolkiah Garrison, along with the Ministry of Defence building contained therein. However, not all have dedicated postcodes; that is having '0' as their last digit, some still use the postcodes of the areas where they are located. For example, Jabatan Laut (Marine Department) uses the postcode BT1728, which is also the postcode for Serasa, the village where the department is located.

== Examples ==
examples of postcodes in Brunei Darussalam
postcode	postcode area, or government department	code breakdown				corresponding area		
postcode	postcode area, or government department	district	mukim	area	post office	district	mukim	village (kampong)
BB3713	Kampong Anggerek Desa	B	B	37	13	Brunei-Muara	Berakas 'A'	Anggerek Desa
BB3510	Bolkiah Garrison	B	B	35	10	Brunei-Muara	Berakas 'A'	Bandar Seri Begawan
BS8610	Ministry of Home Affairs	B	S	86	10	Brunei-Muara	Kianggeh	City Centre
BA2112	Islamic Treasury Hall of Sultan Haji Hassanal Bolkiah	B	A	21	12	Brunei-Muara		
KB4533	Kampong Panaga	K	B	45	33	Belait	Seria	Panaga

== See also ==
- List of postcodes in Brunei
- Brunei Postal Services Department
