= Francization =

Expansion of the French language

Francization (in American English, Canadian English, and Oxford English) or Francisation (in other British English and French; French pronunciation: [fʁɑ̃sizasjɔ̃]), also known as Frenchification, is the expansion of French language use—either through willful adoption or coercion—by more and more social groups who had not before used the language as a common means of expression in daily life. As a linguistic concept, known usually as gallicization or gallicisation, it is the practice of modifying foreign words, names, and phrases to make them easier to spell, pronounce, or understand in French.

According to the Organisation internationale de la Francophonie (OIF), the figure of 220 million Francophones (French-language speakers) is underestimated because it only counts people who can write, understand and speak French fluently, thus excluding a majority of African French-speaking people, who do not know how to write.

In 2014, a study from the French bank Natixis claimed French will become the world's most-spoken language by 2050. However, critics of the study state that French coexists with other languages in many countries and the study's estimates are prone to exaggeration.

The number of Francophones in the world has been rising substantially since the 1980s. In 1985, there were 106 million Francophones around the world. That number quickly rose to 173.2 million in 1997, 200 million in 2005, 220 million in 2010 (+10% from 2007). and reached 274 million in 2014. Forecasts expect that the number of French speakers in Africa alone will reach 400 million in 2025, 715 million (readjusted in 2010) by 2050 and reach 1 billion and 222 million in 2060 (readjusted in 2013). The worldwide French-speaking population is expected to quadruple, whereas the world population is predicted to grow by half.

== Africa ==
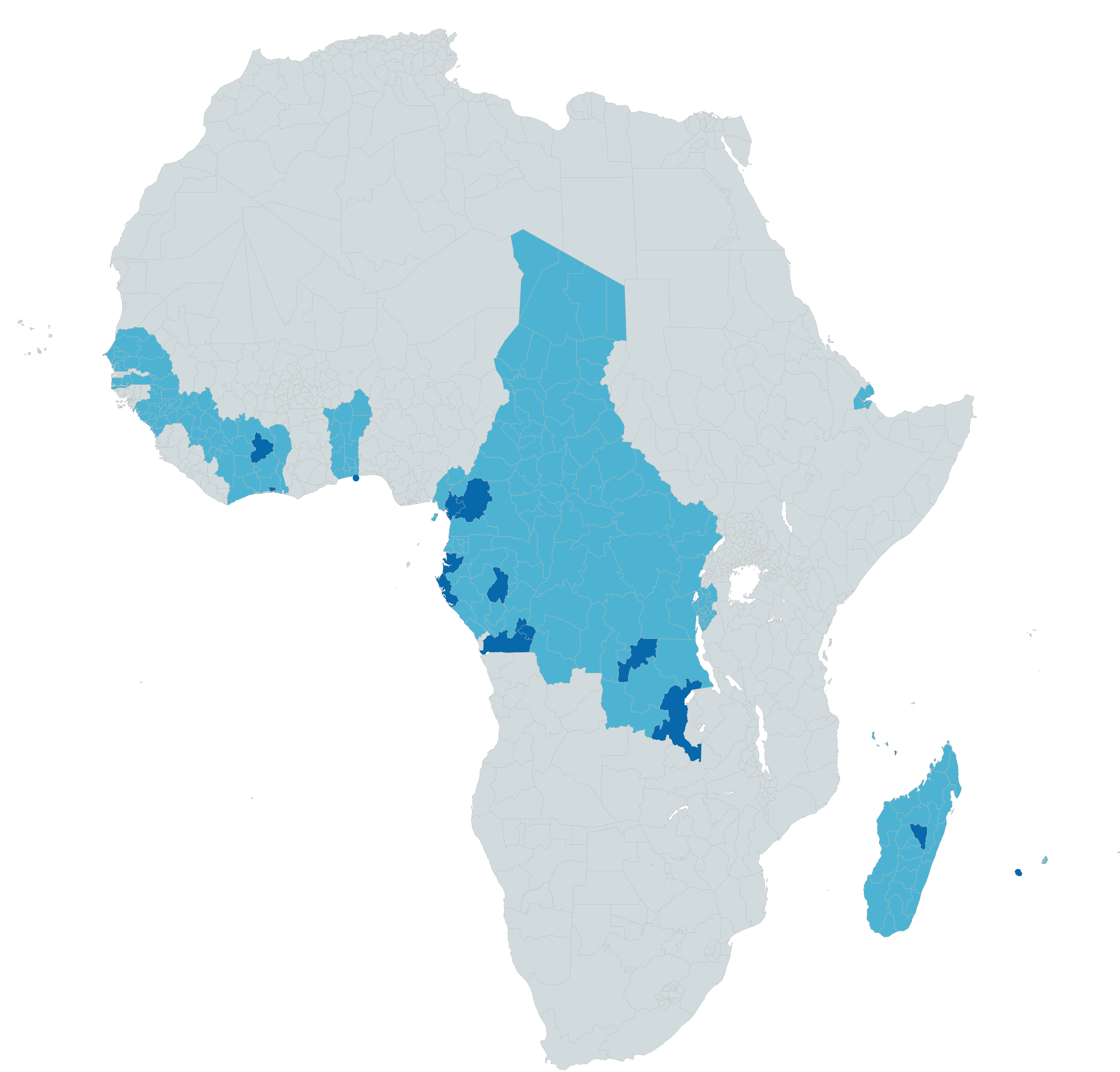
French official status and native speakers as of 2025: Countries in which it is an official de jure language Areas and regions in which it is spoken as a first language

Africa has 32 French-speaking countries, of which 18 recognized it as an official de jure language. French was also the most widely spoken language in Africa in 2015, however it mainly serves as a lingua franca and second language, and is not spoken as a first language by the majority.

However, Nigeria, the most populous country on the continent, is predominantly English speaking.

The Francophone zone of Africa is two times the size of the United States of America (including Alaska).

French was introduced in Africa by France and Belgium during the colonial period. The process of francization continued after the colonial period.

French became the most spoken language in Africa after Arabic and Swahili in 2010. The number of speakers changed very rapidly between 1992 and 2002, with the number of French learners in sub-Saharan Africa increasing by 60.37%, from 22.33 million to 34.56 million people. A similar trend in the Maghreb region is occurring. However, as figures provided by the OIF for the Maghreb region were combined with those of the Middle East, the exact count for the Maghreb countries alone is not possible. Between 1992 and 2002, the number of French language learners in the Maghreb and Middle Eastern regions increased from 10.47 million to 18 million.

Many African countries without French as an official language have recently joined the OIF:

- Cape Verde (official language: Portuguese)
- Egypt (official language: Arabic)
- Ghana (official language: English)
- Guinea-Bissau (official language: Portuguese)
- Mozambique (official language: Portuguese)
- São Tomé and Príncipe (official language: Portuguese)

The French language currently plays an important role in Africa, becoming more popular both as a mother tongue and a lingua franca (in Gabon, Ivory Coast, Congo, Cameroon and Benin, in particular). The African Academy of Languages was established in 2001 to manage the linguistic heritage.

Francophone African countries counted 370 million inhabitants in 2014. This number is expected to reach between 700 and 750 million by 2050. There are already more francophones in Africa than in Europe.

== Asia ==
Vietnam, Cambodia and Laos were once part of French Indochina, part of the French Empire. French culture, in aspects of architecture, cuisine and linguistics, was integrated into local ones, although the latter remained highly distinct. French used to be the official language and was considerably popular and influential in these colonies, but after they were decolonised and gained independence, the new governments generally removed its influence, by implementing the native language as the only official language in the newly independent states. Currently, the presence of the French language in these countries is more minor than before.

== Europe ==
=== England ===
The Norman Conquest of England in 1066 resulted in the Normans under William the Conqueror gradually supplanting the Anglo-Saxon nobility with a Norman one. During this period, the English language "took a back seat in favor of Franco-Norman", with William imposing the usage of Franco-Norman on official life in England. While inhabitants of the English countryside and most urban dwellers spoke Old English, the new Norman nobility and clergymen spoke Franco-Norman, while clerks and scholars continued to write in Latin. During the early part of the Middle Ages, French acquired a significant level of prestige among England's nobility and became the official language of the English judiciary. Today, it is estimated that 50% to 60% of the English language comes from French or Latin.

Cookery gives a good example of this tendency: the names of many farm animals have Anglo-Saxon roots. However, the names of their meat (most commonly consumed by the wealthy during the Middle Ages) have Old French origins:

- Pig (Anglo-Saxon) – Pork from the Old French porc
- Cow (Anglo-Saxon cou) – Beef from the Old French bœuf
- Chicken (Anglo-Saxon) – Poultry from the Old French pouletrie or poule
- Sheep (Anglo-Saxon scæp) – Mutton from the Old French moton

=== France ===
"Francization" is also used to mean any of many cultural assimilation policies implemented by French authorities since the French Revolution. These aimed to impose or maintain the dominance of the French language and French culture. Before the Revolution, French was still a minority language in France by number of speakers, but was the prestige language. The Ordinance of Villers-Cotterêts under King Francis I of France prescribed the official use of the French language, the langue d'oïl dialect spoken at the time in the Île-de-France, in all documents. Other languages, such as Occitan, began to disappear as written languages.

With the decline of Latin, French became increasingly important for writing. Often, people were encouraged or compelled to adopt French, thereby developing a French identity at the expense of their existing one. Use of other languages was often suppressed. This occurred, for example, among the Alemannic-speaking inhabitants of Alsace and the Lorraine Franconian-speaking inhabitants of Lorraine after these regions were conquered by Louis XIV during the seventeenth century, to the Flemings in French Flanders, to the Occitans in Occitania, and to Basques, Bretons, Catalans, Corsicans and Niçards. Corsica passed from the Republic of Genoa to France in 1769 after the Treaty of Versailles. Italian was the official language of Corsica until 1859. Francization occurred in Corsica, and caused a near-disappearance of the Italian language as many of the Italian speakers in these areas migrated to Italy.

Shortly after the fall of the Ancien Régime, the new revolutionary government adopted a policy of promotion of French as a unifying and modernizing language, simultaneously denigrating the status of minority languages as bulwarks of feudalism, Church control of the state, and backwardness in general. In less than a year after coming to power (1792), the Committee for Public Instruction mandated that the newly expanded public education be fortified by sending French-speaking teachers to areas that spoke other languages. This programme achieved many of its aims during the 19th century: by the 1860s, nearly 80% of the national population could speak French.

A map of the County of Nice showing the area of the Italian kingdom of Sardinia annexed in 1860 to France (light brown). The area in red had already become part of France before 1860.

After the Treaty of Turin was signed in 1860 between the Victor Emmanuel II and Napoleon III as a consequence of the Plombières Agreement, the County of Nice was ceded to France as a territorial reward for French assistance in the Second Italian War of Independence against Austria, which saw Lombardy united with Piedmont-Sardinia. The Italian language was the official language of the County of Nice, used by the Church, at the town hall, taught in schools, used in theaters and at the Opera, was immediately abolished and replaced by French. The French government implemented a policy of Francization of society, language and culture of the County of Nice. The toponyms of the communes of the ancient County have been francized, with the obligation to use French in Nice, as well as certain surnames (for example the Italian surname "Bianchi" was francized into "Leblanc", and the Italian surname "Del Ponte" was francized into "Dupont").

By 1900, French had become the mother tongue of the majority of adults in France. Jules Ferry introduced free, compulsory education during the French Third Republic, and openly tried to strengthen the centralised state by instilling a French national identity in the population. French was presented as the language of modernity, as opposed to regional languages such as Breton or Basque, labelled as barbaric or tribal. Pupils caught speaking these languages were punished by making them display tokens of shame. In Occitan-speaking areas that school policy was called the vergonha.

Historically, no official language was recognized by the French Constitution. In 1994, French was declared constitutionally to be the language of the French Republic. In 1998, France became a signatory of the European Charter on Minority Languages; however, it has yet to ratify it, with general agreement among the political class that supportive measures are neither popular enough to attract wide support nor banal enough to be uncontroversial, with concerns specifically about courts forcing the state to act if the rights enshrined in the charter are recognised.

Initiatives to encourage the use of minority languages are limited by the refusal of the French Government to recognize them, on the basis of the French Constitution, which states that "The language of the Republic of France is French". This view was upheld in 2021, when Deputy Paul Molac unexpectedly won a majority vote in the French National Assembly to allow for immersive education in minority languages in state-run schools. The Assembly's decision was immediately contested by the French Constitutional Council, which struck out the parliament's vote. The council also deemed unconstitutional the use of diacritical marks not used in French, such as the tilde in "ñ".

=== Belgium ===
==== Brussels and the Flemish periphery ====
In the last two centuries, Brussels transformed from an exclusively Dutch-speaking city to a bilingual city with French as the majority language and lingua franca. The language shift began in the eighteenth century and accelerated as Belgium became independent and Brussels expanded beyond its original city boundaries. From 1880 onwards, more and more Dutch-speaking people became bilingual, resulting in a rise of monolingual French speakers after 1910. Halfway through the twentieth century, the number of monolingual French-speakers carried the day over the (mostly) bilingual Flemish inhabitants. Only since the 1960s, after the fixation of the Belgian language border and the socio-economic development of Flanders was in full effect, could Dutch stem the tide of increasing French use. The francization of the Flemish periphery around Brussels still continues because of the continued immigration of French speakers coming from Wallonia and Brussels.

== North America ==
=== Canada ===
==== Quebec ====
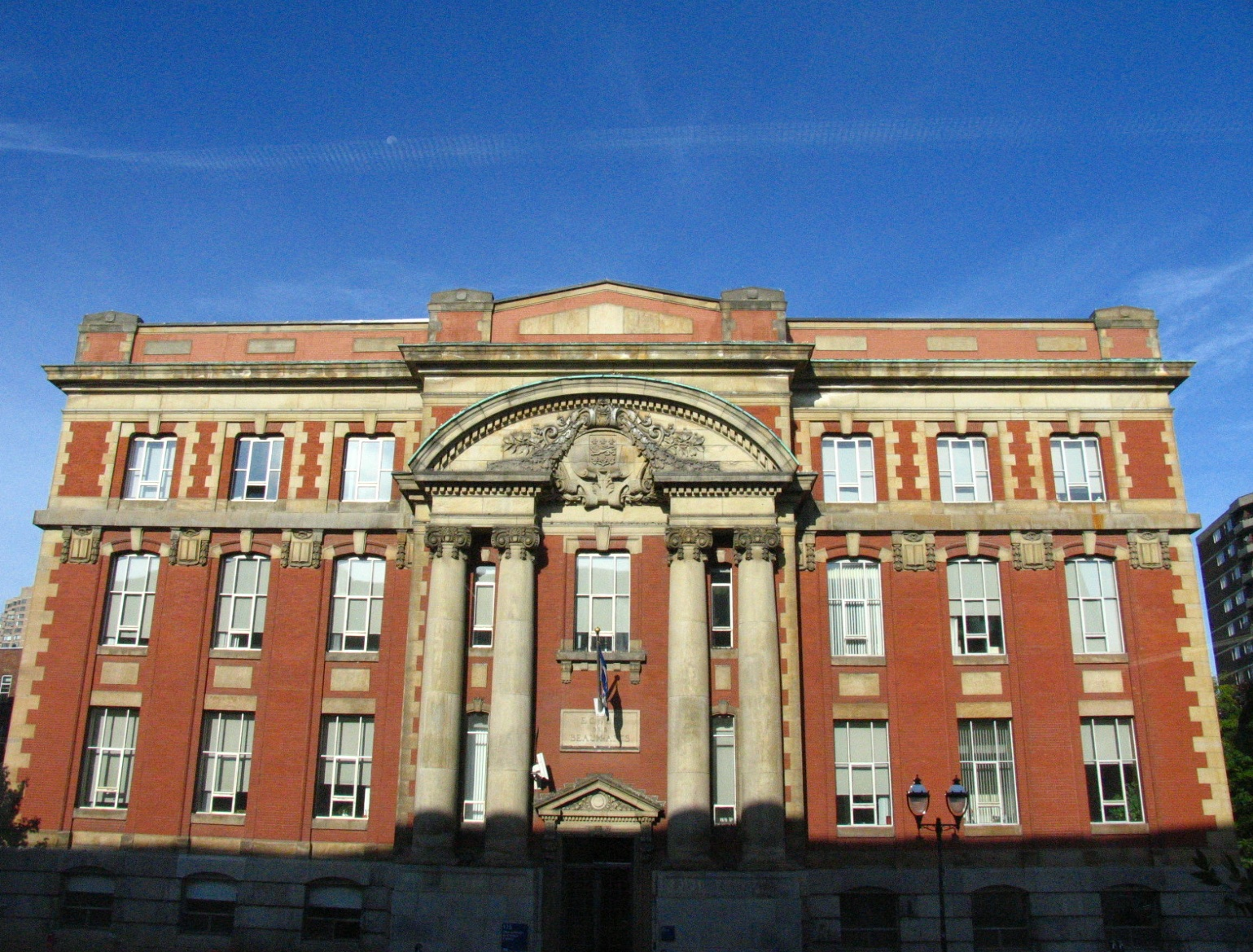
The Office québécois de la langue française's main office, located in the old building of the École des beaux-arts de Montréal

The Government of Quebec has francization policies intended to establish French as the primary language of business and commerce. All businesses are required to provide written communications and schedules in French, and may not make knowledge of a language other than French a condition of hiring unless this is justified by the nature of the duties. Businesses with more than fifty employees are required to register with the Quebec Office of the French language in order to become eligible for a francization certificate, which is granted if the linguistic requirements are met. If not, employers are required to adopt a francization programme, which includes having employees, especially ones in managerial positions, who do not speak French or whose grasp of French is weak attend French-language training.

As part of the francization programme, the Quebec government provides free language courses for recent immigrants (from other countries or other provinces) who do not speak French or whose command of French is weak. The government also provides financial assistance for those who are unable to find employment because they are unable to speak French.

Another aspect of francization in Quebec regards the quality of the French used in Quebec. The Quebec Office of the French language has, since its formation, undertaken to discourage anglicisms and to promote high standards of French-language education in schools.

The francization programs have been considered a great success. Although French as a mother tongue has gone from 80.6% to 77.4% in the province between 1971 and 2016, knowledge of French among the province's population went from 88.5% to 94.5% over the same period. English as a mother tongue fell from 13.1% to 8.8% of the province's population between 1971 and 2016 while knowledge of French among people with English as a mother tongue rose from 37% to 69% over the same period. In 1971, only 14.6% of allophone students were studying in a French school. In 2012, that number had reached 87.5%

In Montreal, unlike the rest of Quebec, the French-speaking proportion of the population diminished. However, this does not mean that the francization programmes failed, as the share of English speakers diminished as well; it seems more likely that the decrease was caused by the fact that 93% of new immigrants to Quebec choose to settle in Montreal, with a corresponding rise in languages other than English and French. The government of Quebec estimates that, over the next 20 years, the Francophone proportion of Montreal will increase again.

But those estimations seem to underestimate the francization of Montreal for some experts, because statistics show that the proportion has already risen from 55.6% (1996) to 56.4% (2001).

The success of francization of Quebec can also be seen over the borders of its territory: in Ontario, the proportion of English speakers dropped from 70.5% in 2001 to 68% in 2006, while the proportion of French speakers went up from 4.06% (488 815) in 2006 to 4.80% (580 000) in 2009. However, this statistic must be examined in conjunction with the effects of Quebec francophone out-migration. Interprovincial migration, especially to Ontario, results in a net loss of population in Quebec. The number of French-speaking Quebecers leaving the province tends to be similar to the number entering, while immigrants to Quebec tend to leave.

None of the Quebec statistics are adjusted to compensate for the percentage—approximately 20%—of Anglophones who departed the province by the mid-1980s as a consequence of linguistic nationalism. By 2001, over 60% of the 1971 population of Quebec Anglophones had left the province.

==== New Brunswick ====
The policy has been even more successful in New Brunswick, for example: the city of Edmundston went from around 89% French-speaking in 1996 to 93.4% in 2006, the city of Moncton from 30.4% in 1996 to 33% in 2006, Dalhousie (from 42.5% to 49.5%) and Dieppe (from 71.1% in 1996 to 74.2% in 2006). Some cities even passed 50% of French speakers between 1991 and 2006 like Bathurst, which passed from 44.6% of French speakers in 1996 to 50.5% in 2006, or Campbellton, from 47% in 1996 to 55% in 2006.

Rates of francization may be established for any group by comparing the number of people who usually speak French to the total number of people in the minority language group. See Calvin Veltman's Language Shift in the United States (1983) for a discussion.

== Of the language ==
There are many examples of francization in history and popular culture:

- chien chaud replacing the typical word "hot dog" on some French-language restaurant menus in Canada.
- Anne Boleyn choosing the French spelling Boleyn over the traditional English Bolin or Bullen.
- Mary, Queen of Scots, choosing the spelling Stuart over Stewart for the name of her dynasty. (The Scots had dual nationality and Mary, Queen of Scots was brought up in France.)
- The common "-escu" final particle in Romanian being traditionally changed to "-esco" in French spellings and being occasionally adopted by the people themselves as a French equivalent of their names (see Eugène Ionesco, Irina Ionesco, Marthe Bibesco).
- Courriel, short for courrier électronique, replacing e-mail (originally from Quebec).

The same exists for other languages, for example, English, in which case names of objects or people can be anglicized.

== See also ==
- Afrancesado, Spanish followers of French culture and politics in the 18th and 19th centuries
- Anglicism
- Englishisation
- French colonial empire
- List of French expressions in English
