= Kilien Stengel =

French author (born 1972)

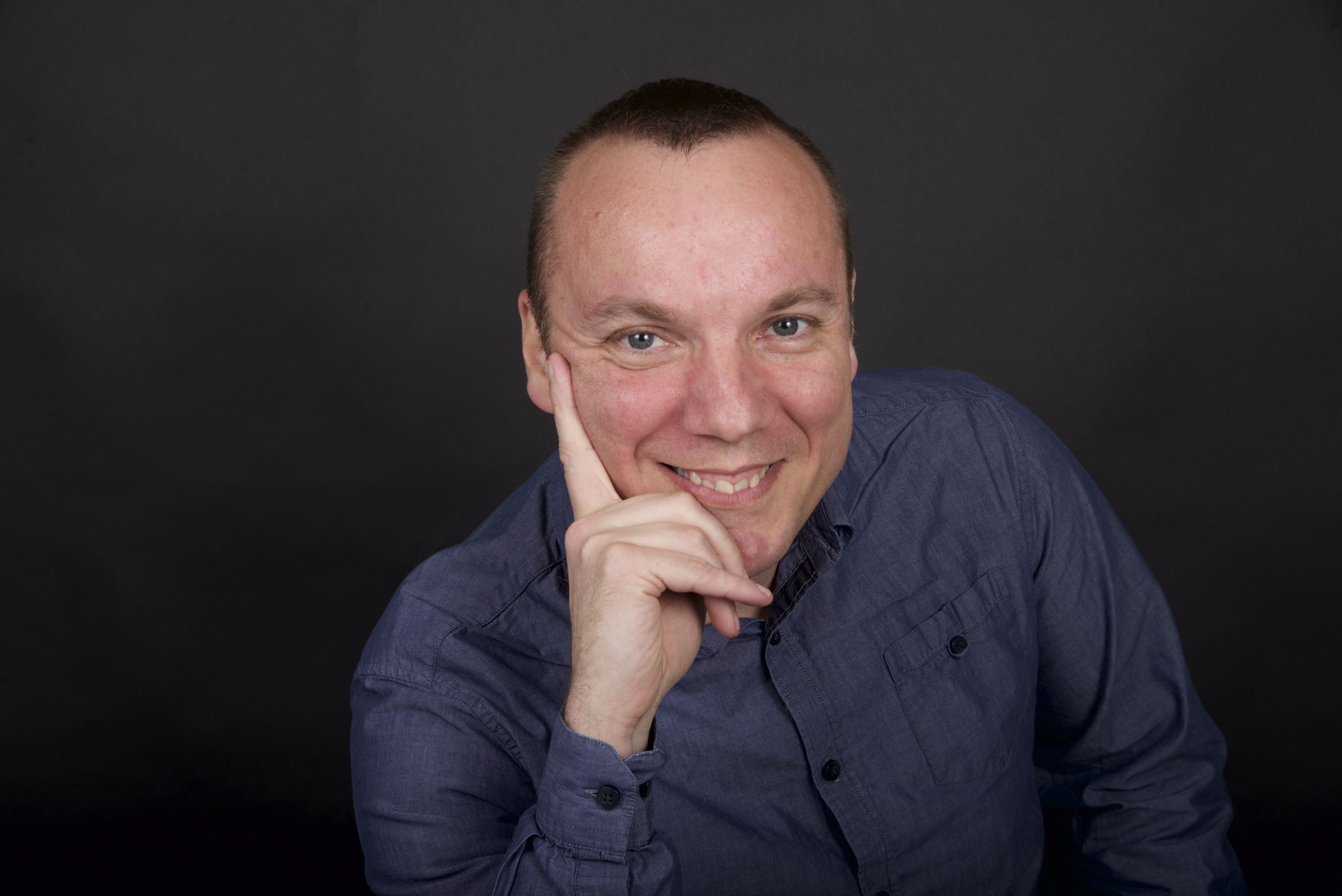
- Kilien Stengel
- Born: Kilien Stengel; 21 March 1972 (age 54); Burgundy, France
- Occupations: Writer and Teacher
- Writing career
- Genres: essay, History, Epistemology, Philosophy
- Subjects: gastronomy, food, éducation
- Notable work: Gastronomie-Gastrosophie-Gastronomisme
- Notable awards: Gourmand World Cookbook Awards 2009-2010-2011-2013-2017
- Website: kilienstengel.com

Kilien Stengel (born 1972 in Nevers) is a French gastronomic author, restaurateur, and cookbook writer. He has worked at Gidleigh Park, Nikko Hotels, Georges V Hotel in Paris, and in a number of Relais & Châteaux restaurants (including Marc Meneau and Jacques Lameloise).

He was a teacher of gastronomy at the Paris Academy and of Orléans-Tours. Stengel works at the European Institute for the History and Culture of Food at François Rabelais University. He is captain of a culinary book fair, and directed a collection book edited by L'harmattan. Usually, he work for Ministère de l'Éducation nationale teacher competition, Meilleur Ouvrier de France award, and Masterchef France. In 2015 his PhD (Doctorat de 3e cycle) in information science was supervised by J-J. Boutaud.

== Works ==
=== literature ===
- Chemins de tables, Ramsay éditions, 2024 ISBN 978-2-81220-509-5

=== Actuality books ===
- Alimentation Bio - Manger et boire bio, Eyrolles publishing, 2009. ISBN 2212542518
- Gastronomie, petite philosophie du plaisir et du goût, Bréal publishing, 2010. ISBN 9782749509945
- Le petit dictionnaire énervé de la gastronomie, L'opportun publishing, 2011. ISBN 9782360750481
- Gastronomie-Gastrosophie-Gastronomisme, L'Harmattan publishing, 2011. ISBN 9782296551978
- Un Ministère de la gastronomie! Pourquoi pas ?, L'Harmattan publishing, 2011. ISBN 9782735220687
- Manifeste du savoir-manger - Pour que nos enfants sachent se nourrir, Praelego publishing, 2012. ISBN 9782813101839
- Suis-je ce que je mange ?, Le Temps qu'il fait publishing, collection Littérature, 2012. ISBN 9782868535887
- Une cantine peut-elle être pédagogique ? L'Harmattan publishing, 2012. ISBN 9782296964198
- L'Aide alimentaire : colis de vivres et repas philanthropiques - Focus sur la Gigouillette, au profit des Restaurants du Cœur, L'Harmattan publishing, collection travaux historiques, 2012. ISBN 9782296967762
- Traité de la Gastronomie : Patrimoine et Culture, Sang de la Terre publishing, 2012. ISBN 9782869852808
- Ca se bouffe pas, ça se déguste, Bréal publishing, 2013.
- Traité du vin en France : Traditions et Terroir, Sang de la Terre publishing, 2013. ISBN 9782869853102
- Traité du fromage en France : Caséologie et authenticité, Sang de la Terre publishing, 2014.
- Hérédités alimentaires et identité gastronomique, L'Harmattan publishing, 2014. ISBN 9782343020969
- Le lexique culinaire de Ferrandi : tout le vocabulaire de la cuisine et de la pâtisserie expliqué en 1.500 définitions et 200 photographies, Hachette, 2015. ISBN 978-2011775993
- Dictionnaire du Bien Manger et des Modèles Culinaires, Honoré Champion, 2015. ISBN 978-2745330581
- (dir.) Des fromages et des hommes : Ethnographie pratique, culturelle et sociale du fromage, L'Harmattan, 2015. ISBN 978-2-343-04925-0
- (co-dir. with Jean-Jacques Boutaud) Cuisine du futur et alimentation de demain, L'Harmattan, 2016. ISBN 978-2-343-08567-8
- Bien-Manger et Manger Bon : Discours et transmission, L'Harmattan, 2016. ISBN 978-2-343-09109-9
- (co-dir. with Anne Parizot) Écrits et Discours culinaires : Quand les mots se mettent à table, L'Harmattan, 2016. ISBN 978-2-343-09718-3
- (dir.) Les gestes culinaires : Mise en scène de savoir-faire, L'Harmattan, 2017. ISBN 978-2-343-11085-1
- (co-dir. with Thibaut de Saint Pol) Les enjeux sociaux des cuisines du futur et alimentations de demain, Cuisine du futur et alimentation de demain series, L’Harmattan, 2016. ISBN 978-2-343-13465-9
- Philosophie & Alimentation : la conscience de bien manger, collection Au-delà des apparences, Ovadia, 2018. ISBN 978-2363922618
- (co-dir. with Pascal Taranto) Futurophagie : Penser la cuisine de demain, série Cuisine du futur et alimentation de demain, L'Harmattan, 2018. ISBN 978-2343147079
- Le lexique culinaire Ferrandi, version coréenne traduite par Hyun Jeong Kang, collection Macaron Éditions Esoope, Séoul, 2017.
- Petit lexique pour comprendre la qualité alimentaire et les labels, Erick Bonnier, 2018, ISBN 978-2367601373
- (dir.) La cuisine a-t-elle un sexe ? Femmes - Hommes, mode d'emploi du genre en cuisine, L'Harmattan, 2018 ISBN 978-2343158686
- (co-dir. with Sihem Debbabi-Missaoui), La cuisine du Maghreb, n’est-elle qu’une simple histoire de couscous ? L’Harmattan, coll. Questions alimentaires et gastronomiques, 2020. ISBN 978-2343195476
- (co-dir. with Philomène Bayet-Robert), Le marketing culinaire et alimentaire face aux défis du XXIe siècle, L’Harmattan, série Cuisine du futur et alimentation de demain, 2020. ISBN 978-2343191577
- (co-dir with Jean-Louis Yengué) Terroir viticole : espace et figure de qualité, collection Tables des hommes, Presses universitaires François-Rabelais, université de Tours, 2020. ISBN 978-2869067318
- (dir.) Terminologies gastronomiques et œnologiques : Aspects patrimoniaux et culturels, L’Harmattan, coll. Questions alimentaires et gastronomiques, 2020. ISBN 978-2343196107
- (dir.) Identités alimentaires et héritages gastronomiques, Paris, L’Harmattan, coll. Questions alimentaires et gastronomiques, 2020
- (co-dir. with S.Sonneville), Cuisine fantastique et alimentation de fiction, L’Harmattan, série Cuisine du futur et alimentation de demain, 2020
- (dir.) La cuisine de demain vue par 50 chefs, L’Harmattan, série Cuisine du futur et alimentation de demain, 2021
- (co-dir. with Bruno Laurioux), Le modèle culinaire français, Presses universitaires François Rabelais, 2021
- (co-dir. with Jean-Jacques Boutaud), Passions dévorantes : De la gastronomie et de l’excès, Éditions le Manuscrit Savoirs, collection Addictions, 2022. ISBN 978-2304052893
- Découvrir le vin par les sens, L’Harmattan, coll. Questions alimentaires et gastronomiques ISBN 978-2140278419
- A la recherche de l’orgasme gastronomique, L’Harmattan, coll. Questions alimentaires et gastronomiques ISBN 978-2-336-41206-1
- Petite philosophie de la gastronomie, Éditions Bréal-Groupe Studyrama, ISBN 978-2749556802
- Le mythe de la gastronomie : Une nourriture de l’esprit, Paris, L’Harmattan, coll. Questions alimentaires et gastronomiques, ISBN 978-2-336-53751-1
- Manger, c'est penser : Une philosophie de l'alimentation, Paris, L’Harmattan, coll. Questions alimentaires et gastronomiques, ISBN 978-2-336-53386-5
- Approche sémiologique de la gastronomie : Objets, signes, rituels et chiffres, symboliques, Paris, L’Harmattan, coll. Questions alimentaires et gastronomiques ISBN 978-2-336-56701-3
- Manuel du non-plaisir alimentaire, Paris, L’Harmattan, coll. Questions alimentaires et gastronomiques ISBN 978-2-336-57854-5
- Le maître d’hôtel du XXIe siècle, Paris, L’Harmattan, coll. Questions alimentaires et gastronomiques, ISBN 978-2-336-60921-8
- À la recherche du temps de manger : Quand la cuisine prend la mesure du temps, Paris, L’Harmattan, coll. Questions alimentaires et gastronomiques, ISBN 978-2-336-59175-9
- En mode carnivore : la place du produit d’origine animale dans notre société, Paris, L’Harmattan, coll. Questions alimentaires et gastronomiques, ISBN 978-2-336-59199-5

=== History books ===
- La Gastronomie du produit à l'assiette, Éditions Alan Sutton, 2008.
- Chronologie historique de la Gastronomie et de l'Alimentation (Dictionnaire), Éditions Du Temps (diffusion Éditions du Seuil), 2008.
- Clamecy – Événements fêtes et vie quotidienne, collection Mémoire en images", Éditions Alan Sutton, 2010.
- Anthologie littéraire de la gastronomie à la Belle époque Éditions L&C, 2012
- La gastronomie autrefois, Sud Ouest editor, 2012. ISBN 978 2817702292
- Histoire divertissante et curieuse de la gastronomie, Grancher publishing, 2013. ISBN 978 2733912614
- A table avec Jules Verne et Phileas Fogg - tour du monde en 80 recettes, editor Agnés Vienot ISBN 9782353261512
- Les classements des vins en France : classifications, distinctions, labellisations, L'Harmattan, 2017. ISBN 978-2-343-10823-0

=== Poésie books ===
- Les poètes de la bonne chère, Anthologie de poésie gastronomique, Éditions de la Table ronde, (groupe Gallimard), 2008.
- Drôles de drames, collectif, Codexlibris publishing, 2010.
- Poètes du vin, Poètes divins, préfaces de Jean-Robert Pitte (président of Paris-Sorbonne University), collection Écriture, Archipel publishing, 2012. ISBN 9782359050561
- Permission de servir Éditions L&C, 2012.
- Les poètes de la bonne chère : nouvelle édition, Collection Petite Vermillon Éditions de la Table ronde (groupe Gallimard), 2017. ISBN 978-2710385547

=== Trivia books ===
- Le Petit Quiz du Vin, Dunod (Hachette), 2007.
- Le Grand QCM du vin, Dunod (Hachette), 2007.
- Le Petit Quiz du vin – version japonaise, éditions Sakuhin Sha (Tokyo), 2009
- Le Grand QCM du vin – version japonaise, éditions Sakuhin Sha (Tokyo), 2009
- Le Grand Quiz du Fromage, Éditions Lanore Delagrave, (Groupe Flammarion), 2008.
- Le Grand Quiz de la bière, Éditions Lanore Delagrave, (Groupe Flammarion), 2008. (Gourmand Cookbook Awards 2010, Beer book category)
- QG 500, le quiz de la gastronomie –Testez votre quotient culinaire, Éditions Menu Fretin, 2009.
- Le nouveau petit quiz du vin - 2e édition, Dunod, 2010.
- La Touraine en question, with Patrick Prieur, publisher Alan Sutton, 2011.
- Pommard ou Pomerol ?, Dunod, 2011.
- Montmartre en question - Patrimoine et gastronomie, co-author, publisher Alan Sutton, 2011
- Almaniak Tout sur le vin en 365 jours 2015, Éditions 365, 2014. ISBN 978-2351555835

=== Games ===
- La boîte à Quiz spéciale Cuisine - Testez votre quotient culinaire, Éditions Marabout, 2011.

=== Practical books ===
- Les critiques aux fourneaux, au profit des Restos du Coeur, collectif, Éditions 4 chemins 2008 (Gourmand World Cookbook Awards 2009, Livre caritatif category)
- Œnologie et crus des vins, Éditions Jérôme Villette (diffusion Matfer), 2008.
- Choisir son vin ! Super facile !, Éditions Solar, 2017, ISBN 978-2263152238

=== School books ===
- Aide-mémoire de la gastronomie en France, Éditions BPI, 2006.ISBN 978-2857084235
- Technologie de service, Éditions Bertrand Lacoste 2008.ISBN 9782735220670
- Technologie culinaire, Éditions Bertrand Lacoste 2008.ISBN 9782735220731
- Le kit pédagogique du professeur professionnel, éditions Eyrolles 2008.ISBN 978-2-212-54163-2
- (dir.) Enseigner l'alimentation, un projet de société : Les Enseignements pratiques interdisciplinaires, L’Harmattan, 2017. ISBN 978-2343121475
- Transmettre la connaissance du vin à l’avenir, L’Harmattan, 2022 ISBN 978-2140334276

}}

=== CD ===
- Œnologie & crus des vins, (durée 12h20) Éditions Groupement des Intellectuels Aveugles ou Amblyopes (GIAA) - DAISY, 2010.

=== Part of book and direction of book ===
- "L'enseignement des vins en école hôtelière", in review Les Territoires du vin, Varia, of Chaire UNESCO « Culture et Traditions du Vin », Maison des sciences de l'homme of Dijon, 2012
- "Préface", in Guide P'tit Jacques, Adfields, 2012
- "Postface", in book Plaidoyer pour l'enseignement des pratiques alimentaires (Hélène Baumert), L'Harmattan, 2013
- "Étude de documents, La relation Mets-Vins", in review TDC n°1064 « Les Repas gastronomique des Français », CNDP, 2013
- "L'enseignement des produits laitiers en école hôtelière : une approche plurielle", in Les reconfigurations récentes des filières laitières en France et en Europe (dir. Daniel Ricard), coll. CERAMAC, Presses universitaires Blaise Pascal, 2013
- "L'explosion des pratiques & loisirs culinaires au XXIe siècle", in review ESPACES, éditions touristiques européennes, 2014
- "L'histoire du canard", in book Le Canard, First edition, 2014
- Book review "Parler vin Entre normes et appropriations" de R. Reckinger, in Food & History, Brepols, Turnhout-Belgique, 2015
- "La dégustation du vin : un acte expérientiel et identitaire entre théâtralisation et culturalisation", in review Lexia n. 19 Alimentation et identité culturelle, Aracne Editrice, Rome, 2015
- "Quand le bon ne rend pas insensible : du bon et de ses rapports avec le sensoriel, conceptuel, relationnel, expérientiel", in Sensible et communication : du cognitif au symbolique (dir.Jean-Jacques Boutaud), ISTE éditions, London, 2015
- "Modèles du bons et concepts du bien manger" in Revue des Sciences Sociales, n°54 « Voir/Savoir », coordonné par Pascal Hintermeyer, Presses universitaires de Strasbourg, 2015
- "L'interdiscours dans la dégustation : une (re)signification des représentations du vocabulaire du vin" in Patrimoine, création, culture à l'intersection des dispositifs et des publics (dir. Cristina Bogdan, Béatrice Fleury, Jacques Walter), coll. "Communication et civilisation" L'Harmattan, 2015
- "Tout ce qui est nouveau est-il tendance ?" in Les Cahiers des Rencontres François Rabelais : Nouvelles tendances culinaires : 10 ans après !, IEHCA, 2015
- "Le Gastronomisme, un sixième sens utile aux repas du futur", in Cuisine du futur et Alimentation de demain, L'Harmattan, 2016
- "La place du culinaire dans le monde de l'écrit : entre excellence et humanisme" in Écrits et discours culinaires : Quand les mots se mettent à table, L'Harmattan, 2016
- "Le paradigme du bien manger : du pragmatique à l'identitaire" in Revue Sciences, Langage et Communication Vol. 1, n°1, École Supérieure de Technologie de Meknès (ESTM), Morocco, 2016
- (with A-H.Marinescu), "Wine Tasting Discourse: Traditional Knowledge, and Practice" in Journal of Social Sciences, Science Publications, Open Journal of Social Sciences, Vol.4 (n°5), pp. 124–134, Wuhan City, Hubei, China, 2016.
- "Paroles de chef : modèles communicationnels d'une organisation professionnelle", Revue de la Société française des sciences de l'information et de la communication, n°9, 2016.
- "La représentation du bon produit et sa transmission", in C. Hugol-Gential, J.-J. Boutaud (dir.) La gastronomie au cœur de la Cité, Éditions universitaires de Dijon (EUD).
- "La bonne cuisine avec ses bons mots", in (dir. F. Argod-Dutard) Le français se met à table, Presses Universitaires de Rennes, 2017. ISBN 978-2753555396.
- "Pierre-François de La Varenne", in (dir. Danièle Sallenave) Recueil des Commémorations nationales 2018, Ministère de la Culture, 2017. ISBN 978-2757705728.
- "Bien manger essence d’une pérennité ?", in (dir. C.Hugol-Gential) Bien et bon à manger, Editions Universitaires de Dijon, 2018. ISBN 978-2364412859.
- "Le vocabulaire de dégustation du vin : Un outil de médiation à la signification patrimoniale", in (dir. V. Négri et N. Lancret) L’odyssée des mots du patrimoine, Presses de l'Université du Québec, 2018
- "La bonne cuisine diachronique : discours et modèles", in (dir. D. Nourrisson) Boire et manger, une histoire culturelle, La Diana, 2018. ISBN 978-2911623318.
- "La représentation de bonne cuisine française du XXIe siècle", in Contemporary French Civilization 42.3-4, Special Issue Beyond Gastronomy: French Food for the 21st century, (dir. Michael Garval & Philippe C. Dubois), Liverpool University Press, ISSN 0147-9156
- "Les significations de la dégustation", in (dir. N. Franjus-Adenis) Communiquer autrement, le vin dans l'imaginaire, L'Harmattan, 2018. ISBN 978-2343145587.
- "Panorama didactique et culturel du vocabulaire alimentaire et des écrits culinaires", in (dir. I. Pierozak) Penser les diversités linguistiques et culturelles. Francophonies, formations à distance, migrances, Lambert-Lucas ISBN 978-2359352429.

=== Collaborations reviews ===
- Director collection Gastronomie et art culinaire, Éditions du Temps (2006–2010)
- Responsible publishing de Gusto, revue culturelle, Éditions ASA (2008–2009)
- Member of the editorial committee, Presses universitaires François Rabelais
- Collaborator Food & History, revue scientifique européenne, Éditions Brepols
- Member of the editorial committee, Les Cahiers de la gastronomie, revue culturelle, éditions Menu Fretin, (Prix littéraire Gastronomie-culture 2010)

=== Awards ===
- 2015 : The French government awarded him its highest honour, the decorations of Officier in Order of Agricultural Merit.
- 2021 : Gourmand World Cookbook Awards, catégorie "Food Heritage & UNESCO" pour Identités alimentaires et héritages gastronomiques
- 2021 : Gourmand World Cookbook Awards, catégorie "Future food 21st century" pour La cuisine de demain vue par 50 étoiles d’aujourd’hui
- 2020 : Gourmand World Cookbook Awards, catégorie "Afrique du nord" pour La Cuisine du Maghreb n’est elle qu’une simple histoire de couscous ?
- 2020 : Gourmand World Cookbook Awards, catégorie "Pour professionnel" pour Le marketing culinaire et alimentaire face aux défis du XXIe siècle.
- 2018 : Concours international littéraire Prix Arts et Lettres de France, Essay category.
- 2018 : Prix Arts et Lettres de France, catégorie Essai.
- 2018 : "Food's Who - Les 500 acteurs les plus influents de la Food en France", website Atabula
- 2018 : Gourmand World Cookbook Awards, category Host country pour l'ouvrage collectif Gastronomie au cœur de la Cité (dirigé par J-J. Boutaud, C. Hugol-Gential, S. Dufour)(Editions universitaires de Dijon)
- 2018 : Gourmand World Cookbook Awards, category Livres pour professionnels pour Les gestes culinaires : Mise en scène de savoir-faire(ed. L'Harmattan)
- 2017 : Gourmand World Cookbook Awards, category Health and Nutrition for Bien-Manger et Manger Bon : Discours et transmission (ed. L'Harmattan).
- 2015 : Gourmand World Cookbook Awards, categoryBest French Cuisine Book for Lexique culinaire Ferrandi (ed. Hachette)
- 2015 : Gourmand World Cookbook Awards, category Best Cheese – Milk Book for Des fromages et des hommes (ed. L'Harmattan)
- 2015 : The French government awarded him its highest honour, the decorations of Chevalier in Order of Agricultural Merit.
- 2014 : Prix Montesquieu, category Littérature for Poètes du vin Poètes divins.
- 2014 : Nomination au prix Jean Carmet, salon du livre et du vin de Saumur, for Traité du vin (Sang de la terre)
- 2013 : Gourmand World Cookbook Awards, category Littérature gastronomique for Histoire divertissante et curieuse de la Gastronomie (ed. Grancher).
- 2013 : Grand prix Académie nationale de cuisine, category Cuisine du monde for A table avec Jules Verne - Le tour du monde de Phileas Fogg en 80 recettes (ed. Vienot)
- 2012 : Gourmand World Cookbook Awards, category Cuisine Française for Le Traité de la gastronomie française (ed. Sang de la terre)
- 2012 : Mérite culinaire Prosper Montagné
- 2010 : Gourmand World Cookbook Awards for Le Grand Quiz de la bière (éd. Delagrave)
- 2009 : Gourmand World Cookbook Awards for Les critiques aux fourneaux (ed.Quatre Chemins)
- 2009 : Gourmand World Cookbook Awards for Chronologie de la gastronomie et de l'alimentation (ed. du temps)
- 2008 : Mention spéciale du jury du 'Salon international du livre gourmand', à Périgueux, for Les critiques aux Fourneaux (éd. Quatre Chemins).
