= Cubic centimetre =

Unit of volume

cubic centimetre
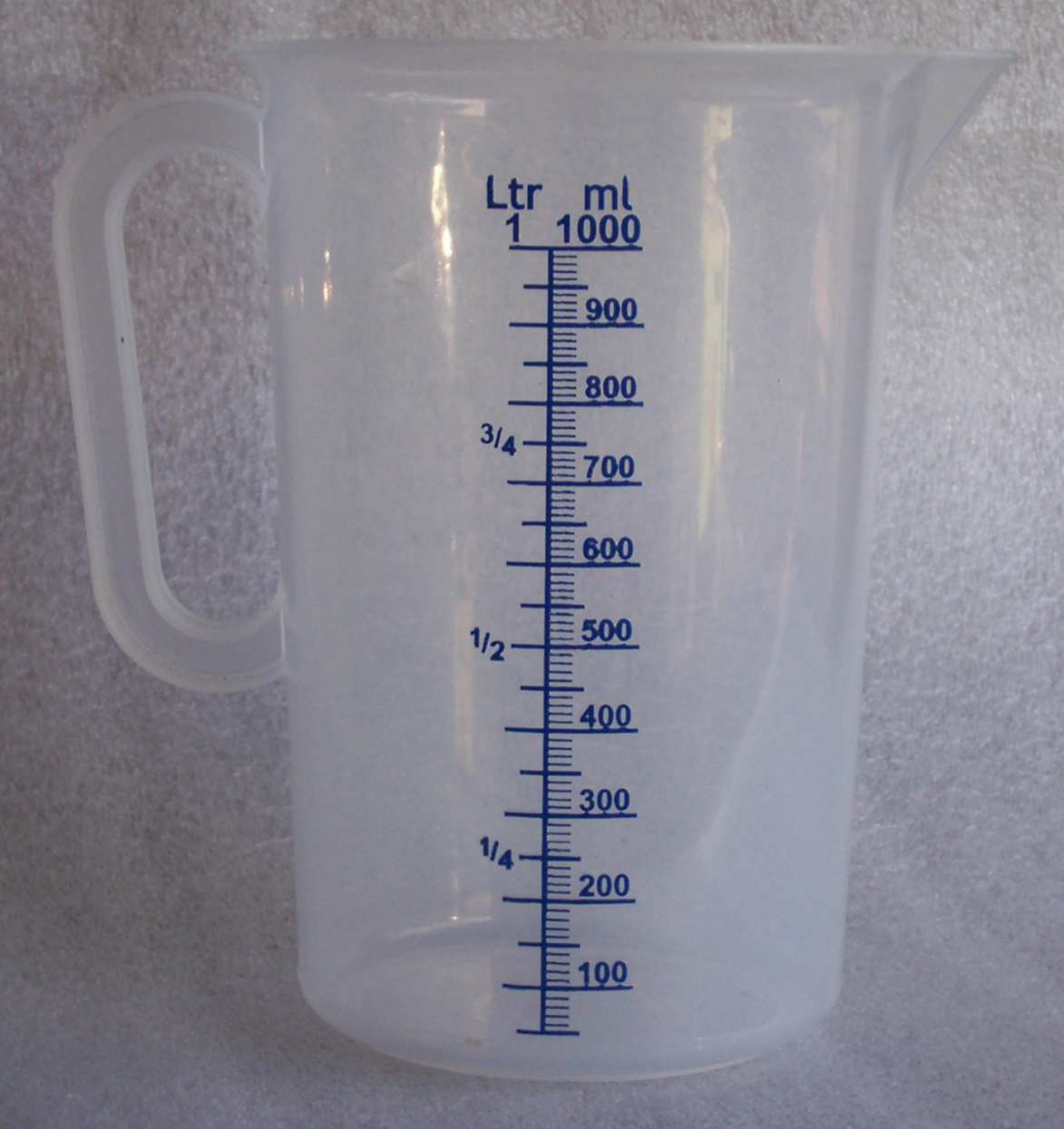
- A measuring cup holding 1000 cubic centimetres, that is one litre (1 L) or 1000 millilitres (1000 mL)

General information
- Unit system: Prefixed SI derived unit
- Unit of: volume
- Symbol: cm^{3}

Conversions
1 cm^{3} in ...	... is equal to ...
- SI base units: 10^{−6} m^{3}
- Imperial and U.S. customary: 0.06102374 in^{3}

Some SI units of volume to scale and approximate corresponding mass of water

A cubic centimetre (or cubic centimeter in US English) (SI unit symbol: cm^{3}; non-SI abbreviations: cc and ccm) is a commonly used unit of volume that corresponds to the volume of a cube that measures 1 cm × 1 cm × 1 cm. One cubic centimetre corresponds to a volume of one millilitre. The mass of one cubic centimetre of water at 3.98 °C (the temperature at which it attains its maximum density) is almost equal to one gram.

One complete cycle of a straight-four engine. The areas marked in orange represent the displaced volumes.

In internal combustion engines, "cc" refers to the total volume of its engine displacement in cubic centimetres. The displacement can be calculated using the formula

$$d = {\pi \over 4} b^2 s n,$$
where d is engine displacement, b is the bore of the cylinders, s is length of the stroke and n is the number of cylinders.

Conversions

- 1 millilitre = 1 cm^{3}
- 1 litre = 1000 cm^{3}
- 1 cubic inch = 16.38706 cm^{3}.

== Unicode character ==
The "cubic centimetre" symbol is encoded by Unicode at code point U+33A4 ㎤ SQUARE CM CUBED, and also as U+33C4 ㏄ SQUARE CC.

== See also ==
- Cubic inch
