= American and British English spelling differences =

British and American spellings around the world: British analyse/crystallise (crystallize in Oxford spelling)/centre/defence/labour/programme (except for computer program) dominant; English is an official or majority language American analyze/crystallize (less commonly crystalize)/center (except for some place names, e.g. Centre County)/defense/labor (except for some names, e.g. Living Colour)/program dominant; English is an official or majority language Canadian analyze/crystallize/centre/defence/labour/program dominant; English is one of two official languages along with French Australian analyse/crystallise/centre/defence/labour (except for Labor Party)/program dominant; English is an official or majority language English is not an official or majority language; British spelling is dominant English is not an official or majority language; American spelling is dominant English is not an official or majority language; inconsistent use of American and British spelling

Despite the various English dialects spoken from country to country and within different regions of the same country, there are only slight regional variations in English orthography, the two most notable variations being British and American spelling. Many of the differences between American and British or Commonwealth English date back to a time before spelling standards were developed. For instance, some spellings seen as "American" were once commonly used in the United Kingdom, and some spellings seen as "British" were once commonly used in the United States.

A British standard began to emerge following the 1755 publication of Samuel Johnson's A Dictionary of the English Language, and an American standard started following the work of Noah Webster and, in particular, his An American Dictionary of the English Language, first published in 1828. Webster's efforts at spelling reform were effective in his native country, resulting in certain well-known patterns of spelling differences between the American and British varieties of English.

== Historical origins ==
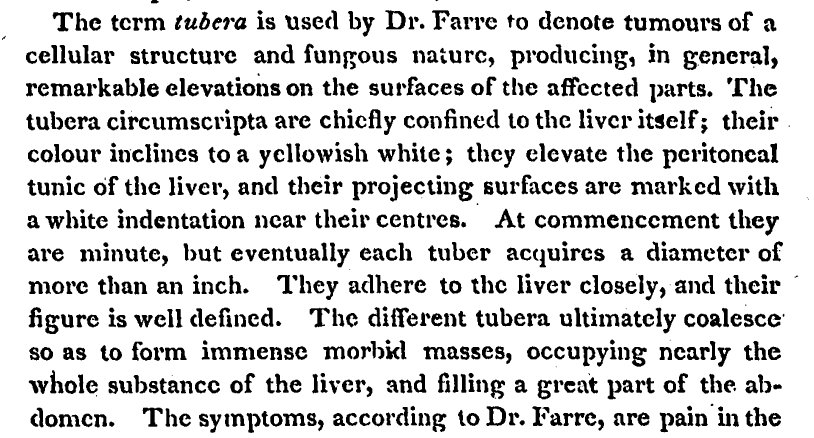
An 1814 American medical text showing British spellings that were still in use (tumours, colour, centres)

In the early 18th century, English spelling was inconsistent. These differences became noticeable after the publication of influential dictionaries. British English spellings mostly follow Johnson's A Dictionary of the English Language (1755), while many American English spellings follow Webster's An American Dictionary of the English Language ("ADEL", "Webster's Dictionary", 1828).

Webster was a proponent of English spelling reform for reasons both philological and nationalistic. In A Companion to the American Revolution (2008), John Algeo notes:

it is often assumed that characteristically American spellings were invented by Noah Webster. He was very influential in popularizing certain spellings in the United States, but he did not originate them. Rather [...] he chose already existing options such as center, color and check for the simplicity, analogy or etymology.

William Shakespeare's first folios, for example, used spellings such as center and color as much as centre and colour. Webster did attempt to introduce some reformed spellings, as did the Simplified Spelling Board in the early 20th century, but most were not adopted. Later spelling adjustments in the United Kingdom had little effect on American spellings and vice versa.

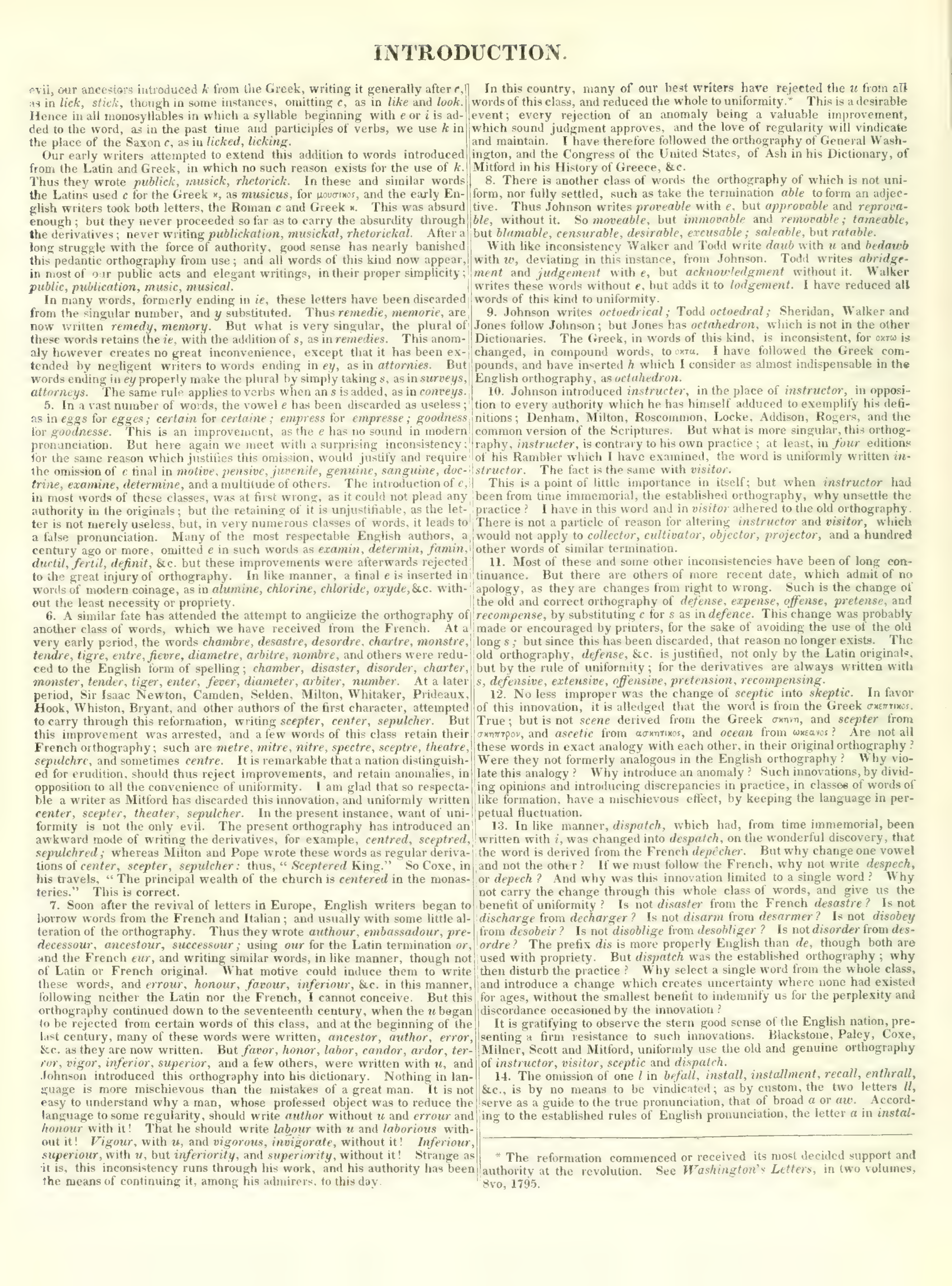
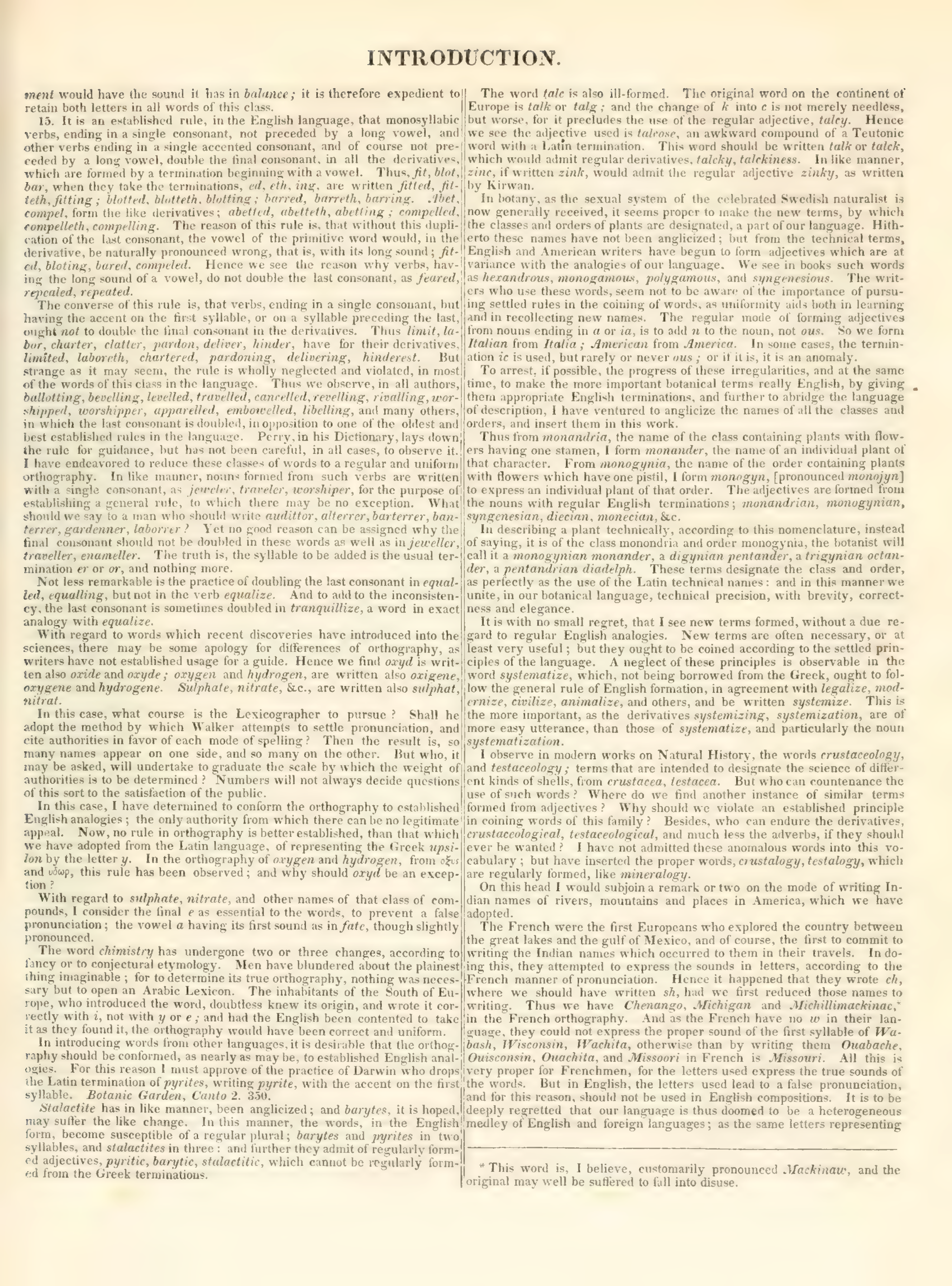
Extract from the Orthography section of the first edition (1828) of Webster's "ADEL", which popularized the "American standard" spellings of -er (6); -or (7); the dropped -e (8); -se (11); and the doubling of consonants with a suffix (15)

For the most part, the spelling systems of most Commonwealth countries and Ireland closely resemble the British system. In Canada, the spelling system can be said to follow both British and American forms, and Canadians are somewhat more tolerant of foreign spellings than are other English-speaking nationalities. Australian English mostly follows British spelling norms but has strayed slightly, with some American spellings incorporated as standard. New Zealand English is almost identical to British spelling, except in the word fiord (instead of fjord). There is an increasing use of macrons in words that originated in Māori and an unambiguous preference for -ise endings (see below).

== Latin-derived spellings (often through Romance) ==
=== -our, -or ===
Most words ending in an unstressed ‑our in British English end in ‑or in American English. This affects the British spellings arbour, ardour, armour, behaviour, candour, clamour, clangour, colour, demeanour, dolour, enamour, endeavour, favour, fervour, flavour, harbour, honour, humour, labour, neighbour, odour, parlour, rancour, rigour, rumour, saviour, savour, splendour, succour, tumour, valour, vapour, and vigour. Wherever the vowel is unreduced in pronunciation (e.g., devour, contour, flour, paramour, tour, troubadour, and velour), however, the spelling is uniform in all English varieties.

Most words of this kind come from Latin, where their endings were spelled ‑or. They were first adopted into English from early Old French, and the ending was spelled ‑our, ‑or or ‑ur. After the Norman Conquest, the ending became ‑our to match the later Old French spelling. The ‑our ending was used not only in new English borrowings, but was also applied to the earlier borrowings that had used ‑or. However, ‑or was still sometimes found. The first three folios of Shakespeare's plays used both spellings before they were standardised to ‑our in the Fourth Folio of 1685.

After the Renaissance, new borrowings from Latin were taken up with their original ‑or ending, and many words once ending in ‑our (for example, chancellour and governour) reverted to ‑or. A few words of the ‑our/or group do not have a Latin counterpart that ends in ‑or; for example, armo(u)r, behavio(u)r, harbo(u)r, neighbo(u)r; also arbo(u)r, meaning "shelter", though senses "tree" and "tool" are always arbor, a false cognate of the other word. Some 16th- and early 17th-century British scholars indeed insisted that ‑or be used for words from Latin (e.g., color) and ‑our for French loans; however, in many cases, the etymology was not clear, and therefore some scholars advocated ‑or only and others ‑our only.

Webster's 1828 dictionary had only -or and is given much of the credit for the adoption of this form in the United States. By contrast, Johnson's 1755 (pre-US independence and establishment) dictionary used -our for all words still so spelled in the United Kingdom (like colour), but also for words where the u has since been dropped: ambassadour, emperour, errour, governour, horrour, inferiour, mirrour, perturbatour, superiour, tenour, terrour, tremour. Johnson, unlike Webster, was not an advocate of spelling reform, but chose the spelling best derived, as he saw it, from among the variations in his sources. He preferred French over Latin spellings because, as he put it, "the French generally supplied us". English speakers who moved to the United States took these preferences with them. In the early 20th century, H. L. Mencken notes that "honor appears in the 1776 Declaration of Independence, but it seems to have been put there rather by accident than by design". In Jefferson's original draft it is spelled "honour". In the United Kingdom, examples of behavior, color, flavor, harbor, and neighbor rarely appear in Old Bailey court records from the 17th and 18th centuries, whereas there are thousands of examples of their -our counterparts. One notable exception is honor. Honor and honour were equally frequent in the United Kingdom until the 17th century; honor only exists in the UK now as the spelling of Honor Oak, a district of London, and of the occasional given name Honor.

==== Derivatives and inflected forms ====
In derivatives and inflected forms of the -our/or words, British usage depends on the nature of the suffix used. The u is kept before English suffixes that are freely attachable to English words (for example in humourless, neighbourhood, and savoury) and suffixes of Greek or Latin origin that have been adopted into English (for example in behaviourism, favourite, and honourable). However, before Latin suffixes that are not freely attachable to English words, the u:

- may be dropped, for example in honorary, honorific, humorist, humorous, invigorate, laborious, and vigorous;
- may be either dropped or kept, for example in colo(u)ration and colo(u)rize or colo(u)rise; or
- may be kept, for example in colourist.

In American usage, derivatives and inflected forms are built by simply adding the suffix in all cases (for example, favorite, savory, etc.) since the u is absent to begin with.

==== Exceptions ====
American usage, in most cases, keeps the u in the word glamour, which comes from Scots, not Latin or French. The adjective glamorous often drops the first "u". Saviour is a somewhat common variant of savior in the US. The British spelling is very common for honour (and favour) in the formal language of wedding invitations in the US. The name of the Space Shuttle Endeavour has a u in it because the spacecraft was named after British Captain James Cook's ship, HMS Endeavour. The (former) special car on Amtrak's Coast Starlight train is known as the Pacific Parlour car, not Pacific Parlor. Proper names such as Pearl Harbor or Sydney Harbour are usually spelled according to their native-variety spelling vocabulary.

The name of the herb savory is spelled thus everywhere, although the related adjective savo(u)ry, like savo(u)r, has a u in the UK. Honor (the name) and arbor (the tool) have -or in the United Kingdom, as mentioned above, as does the word pallor. As a general noun, rigour /ˈrɪɡər/ has a u in the UK; the medical term rigor (sometimes /ˈraɪɡər/) does not, such as in rigor mortis, which is Latin. Derivations of rigour/rigor such as rigorous, however, are typically spelled without a u, even in the UK. Words with the ending -irior, -erior or similar are spelled thus everywhere. Junior and senior were borrowed directly from Latin in the 13th century (as adjectives for father-son namesakes), and have never had -our forms anywhere.

The word armour was once somewhat common in American usage but has disappeared except in some brand names such as Under Armour.

The agent suffix -or (separator, elevator, translator, animator, etc.) is spelled thus both in American and British English.

==== Commonwealth usage ====
Commonwealth countries normally follow British usage. Canadian English most commonly uses the -our ending and -our- in derivatives and inflected forms. Owing to close geographic and business ties with the United States, -or endings are also sometimes used. Throughout the late 19th and early to mid-20th century, most Canadian newspapers chose to follow the American usage of -or endings, originally to save time and money in the era of manual movable type. However, in the 1990s, the majority of Canadian newspapers officially updated their spelling policies to the British usage of -our. This coincided with a renewed interest in Canadian English, and the release of the updated Gage Canadian Dictionary in 1997 and the first Canadian Oxford Dictionary in 1998. Historically, most libraries and educational institutions in Canada have supported the use of the Oxford English Dictionary (OED) rather than the American Webster's Dictionary.

In Australia, -or endings enjoyed some use throughout the 19th century and in the early 20th century. Like Canada, though, most major Australian newspapers have switched from "-or" endings to "-our" endings. The "-our" spelling is taught in schools nationwide as part of the Australian curriculum. The most notable countrywide use of the -or ending is for one of the country's major political parties, the Australian Labor Party, which was originally named "the Australian Labour Party" in 1908, but was frequently referred to as both "Labour" and "Labor". The "Labor" spelling was adopted from 1912 onward due to the influence of the American labor movement and King O'Malley. On top of that, some place names in South Australia such as Victor Harbor, Franklin Harbor or Outer Harbor are usually spelled with the -or spellings. Aside from that, -our is now almost universal in Australia but the -or endings remain a minority variant. New Zealand English, while sharing some words and syntax with Australian English, follows British usage.

=== -re, -er ===
In British English, some words from French, Latin or Greek end with a consonant followed by an unstressed -re (pronounced /ə(r)/). In modern American English, most of these words have the ending -er. The difference is most common for words ending in -bre or -tre: British spellings accoutre (see exceptions), bistre, calibre, centre, dioptre, fibre, goitre, litre, louvre, lustre, manoeuvre, meagre, metre (length), mitre, nitre, ochre, philtre, reconnoitre, sabre, saltpetre, sceptre, sepulchre, sombre, spectre, theatre (see exceptions) and titre all have -er in American spelling.

In the United Kingdom, both -re and -er spellings were common before Johnson's 1755 dictionary was published. Following this, -re became the most common usage in the United Kingdom. In the United States, following the publication of Webster's Dictionary in the early 19th century, American English became more standardized, exclusively using the -er spelling.

In addition, the spelling of some words have been changed from -re to -er in both varieties. These include amber, blister, cadaver, canister, chamber, chapter, charter, cider, coffer, coriander, cover, cucumber, cylinder, December, diaper, disaster, enter, fever, filter, gender, leper, letter, lobster, master, member, meter (measuring instrument), minister, monster, murder, November, number, October, offer, order, oyster, powder, proper, render, semester, September, sequester, sinister, sober, surrender, tender, and tiger. Words using the -meter suffix (from Ancient Greek -μέτρον métron, via French -mètre) normally had the -re spelling from earliest use in English but were superseded by -er. Examples include thermometer and barometer.

The e preceding the r is kept in American-inflected forms of nouns and verbs, for example, fibers, reconnoitered, centering, which are fibres, reconnoitred, and centring respectively in British English. According to the OED, centring is a "word ... of 3 syllables (in careful pronunciation)" (i.e., /ˈsɛntərɪŋ/), yet there is no vowel in the spelling corresponding to the second syllable (/ə/). The OED online edition allows either two or three syllables. The e is dropped for other derivations, for example, central, fibrous, spectral. However, the existence of related words without e before the r is not proof for the existence of an -re British spelling: for example, entry and entrance come from enter, which has not been spelled entre for centuries. (Note: From the OED citations, Chaucer used both forms, but the last usages of the "re" form were in the early 18th century.)

The difference relates only to root words; -er rather than -re is universal as a suffix for agentive (reader, user, winner) and comparative (louder, nicer) forms. One outcome is the British distinction of meter for a measuring instrument from metre for the unit of length. However, while poetic metre is often spelled as -re, pentameter, hexameter, etc. are always -er. (Note: Except in a 1579 usage)

==== Exceptions ====
Many other words have -er in British English. These include Germanic words, such as anger, mother, timber and water, and such Romance-derived words as danger, quarter and river.

The ending -cre, as in acre, (Note: Although acre was spelled æcer in Old English and aker in Middle English, the acre spelling of Middle French was introduced in the 15th century. Similarly, loover was respelled in the 17th century by influence of the unrelated Louvre.) lucre, massacre, and mediocre, is used in both British and American English to show that the c is pronounced /k/ rather than /s/. The spellings euchre and ogre are also the same in both British and American English.

The spelling theatre is a variant in American English. It appears frequently in names, such as those of many New York City theatres on Broadway, especially of things named when it was still the prevailing spelling. (In British English, a theatre is where stage performances take place but not film screenings – these take place in a cinema, or picture theatre in Australia.)

It is sometimes claimed that, in the US, these two spellings have different meanings, with theatre referring to dramatic arts and theater referring to buildings. However, the trade magazine American Theatre described this as a "popular myth", as theater is the prevailing American spelling used to refer to both dramatic arts and buildings. National US newspapers such as The New York Times use theater in their entertainment sections; the Times even corrects proper names from theatre to theater. The spelling theatre was previously more common, prevailing into at least the 1960s, with organizations such as Theatre Communications Group, founded 1961, and The Guthrie Theater, founded 1963, using it. The New York Times switched to using theater in 1962, The Guthrie changed its spelling in 1971, and the spelling has become increasingly common since.

Some placenames in the United States use Centre in their names. Examples include the villages of Newton Centre and Rockville Centre, the city of Centreville, Centre County and Centre College. Sometimes, these places were named before spelling changes but more often the spelling serves as an affectation. Proper names are usually spelled according to their native-variety spelling vocabulary; so, for instance, although Peter is the usual form of the male given name, as a surname both the spellings Peter and Petre (the latter notably borne by a British lord) are found.

For British accoutre, the American practice varies: the Merriam-Webster Dictionary prefers the -re spelling, but The American Heritage Dictionary of the English Language prefers the -er spelling.

More recent French loanwords keep the -re spelling in American English. These are not exceptions when a French-style pronunciation is used (/rə/ rather than /ə(r)/), as with double entendre, genre and oeuvre. The unstressed /ə(r)/ pronunciation of an -re ending is used either as the most common variant or an alternative pronunciation with some words, including cadre, macabre, maître d', Notre Dame, piastre, and timbre.

==== Commonwealth usage ====
The -re endings are mostly standard throughout the Commonwealth. The -er spellings are recognized as minor variants in Canada, partly due to US influence. They are sometimes used in proper names.

=== -ce, -se ===
For advice/advise and device/devise, American English and British English both keep the noun–verb distinction both graphically and phonetically (where the pronunciation is -/s/ for the noun and -/z/ for the verb). For licence/license or practice/practise, British English also keeps the noun–verb distinction graphically (although phonetically the two words in each pair are homophones with -/s/ pronunciation). On the other hand, American English uses license and practice for both nouns and verbs (with -/s/ pronunciation in both cases too).

American English has kept the Anglo-French spelling for defense and offense, which are defence and offence in British English. Likewise, there are the American pretense and British pretence; but derivatives such as defensive, offensive, and pretension are always thus spelled in both systems.

Australian and Canadian usages generally follow British usage.

=== -xion, -ction ===
The spelling connexion is now rare in everyday British usage, its use lessening as knowledge of Latin attenuates, and it has almost never been used in the US: the more common connection has become the standard worldwide. According to the OED, the older spelling is more etymologically conservative, since the original Latin word had -xio-. The American usage comes from Webster, who abandoned -xion and preferred -ction. Connexion was still the house style of The Times of London until the 1980s and was still used by Post Office Telecommunications for its telephone services in the 1970s, but had by then been overtaken by connection in regular usage (for example, in more popular newspapers). Connexion (and its derivatives connexional and connexionalism) is still in use by the Methodist Church of Great Britain to refer to the whole church as opposed to its constituent districts, circuits and local churches, whereas the US-based United Methodist Church uses Connection.

Complexion (from complex) is the standard form worldwide, though complection does exist as an uncommon variant. The adjective complected (as in "dark-complected"), although sometimes proscribed, is on equal footing in the United States with complexioned. It is not used in this way in the UK, although there exists a rare alternative meaning of complicated.

== Greek-derived and Latin-derived spellings ==
=== ae and oe ===
In American English, medical terms that are written with ae/æ (Note: Pronounced /iː/ or /ɛ/ (or, when unstressed, /i/, /ɪ/ or /ə/)) or oe/œ (Note: Pronounced /iː/ (or, when unstressed, /i/ or /ɪ/)) in British English are written only with an e. Examples are (with the non-American letter in bold): anaemia, anaesthesia, caecum, coeliac, diarrhoea, faeces, foetal, gynaecology, haemoglobin, haemophilia, haemorrhage, leukaemia, oesophagus, oestrogen, orthopaedic, (Note: The majority of American college, university, and residency programs, as well as the American Academy of Orthopaedic Surgeons, still use the spelling with the digraph ae, though hospitals usually use the shortened form.) paediatric. The chemical haem (named as a shortening of haemoglobin) is spelled heme in American English, to avoid confusion with hem.

Canadian English mostly follows American English in this respect, although it is split on gynaecology (e.g. Society of Obstetricians and Gynaecologists of Canada vs. the Canadian Medical Association's Canadian specialty profile of obstetrics/gynecology). Pediatrician is preferred roughly 10 to 1 over paediatrician, while foetal and oestrogen are similarly uncommon.

Additionally, there are non-medical terms that follow this rule: aeon, caesium, encyclopaedia, manoeuvre, palaeontology and paedophile. Oenology is acceptable in American English, but is considered a minor variant of enology, whereas although ameba, archeology and esthetic exist in American English, the spellings amoeba, archaeology and aesthetic prevail. The same is the case for paean, palaestra, phoenix and subpoena.

Words that can be spelled either way in British English include chamaeleon, encyclopaedia, homoeopathy, mediaeval (a minor variant in both AmE and BrE), foetid and foetus. The spellings foetus and foetal are Britishisms based on a mistaken etymology. The etymologically correct original spelling fetus reflects the Latin original and is the standard spelling in medical journals worldwide; the OED notes that "In Latin manuscripts both fētus and foetus are used".

The Ancient Greek diphthongs <αι> and <οι> were transliterated into Latin as <ae> and <oe>. The ligatures æ and œ were introduced when the sounds became monophthongs, and were later applied to words not of Greek origin in both Latin (for example, cœli)) and French (for example, œuvre). In English, which has adopted words from all three languages, it is now usual to replace Æ/æ with Ae/ae and Œ/œ with Oe/oe. In many words, the digraph has been reduced to a lone e in all varieties of English: for example, oeconomics, praemium, and aenigma. In other cases, the digraph is retained across all varieties. Despite phoenix and subpoena being the most common spellings in American English, the uncommon variants phenix and subpena are occasionally used, with Phenix in Virginia illustrating the variant spelling. The retention of the digraph is especially common in names: Aegean (the sea), Caesar, Oedipus, Phoebe, etc., although "caesarean section" may be spelled as "cesarean section". There is no reduction of Latin -ae plurals (e.g., larvae); nor where the digraph <ae>/<oe> does not result from the Greek-style ligature as, for example, in maelstrom or toe; the same is true for the British form aeroplane (compare other aero- words such as aerosol). The now chiefly North American airplane is not a respelling but a recoining, modelled after airship and aircraft. The word airplane dates from 1907, at which time the prefix aero- was trisyllabic, often written aëro-.

==== Commonwealth usage ====
In Canada, oe and ae are sometimes found in academic and scientific writing as well as government publications (for example, the fee schedule of the Ontario Health Insurance Plan) and some words such as palaeontology or aeon. In Australia, it can go either way, depending on the word: for instance, medieval is spelled with the e rather than ae, following the American usage along with numerous other words such as eon or fetus, while other words such as oestrogen or paediatrician are spelled the British way. The Macquarie Dictionary also notes a growing tendency towards replacing ae and oe with e worldwide and with the exception of manoeuvre, all British or American spellings are acceptable variants. Elsewhere, the British usage prevails, but the spellings with just e are increasingly used. Manoeuvre is the only spelling in Australia, and the most common one in Canada, where maneuver and manoeuver are also sometimes found.

One exception is that while British and American English both use the spelling "palaeolithic", the Canadian English standard spelling is "paleolithic", which is one of the very few instances where the Canadian spelling of a word differs from both the British and American spellings of that word.

== Greek-derived spellings (often through Latin and Romance) ==
=== -ise, -ize (-isation, -ization) ===
==== Origin and recommendations ====
The -ize spelling is often incorrectly seen in the United Kingdom as an Americanism. It has been in use since the 15th century, predating the -ise spelling by over a century. The verb-forming suffix -ize comes directly from Ancient Greek -ίζειν (-ízein) or Late Latin -izare, while -ise comes via French -iser, which itself stems from the same Greek suffix. The OED recommends -ize and lists the -ise form as an alternative.

Publications by Oxford University Press (OUP)—such as Henry Watson Fowler's A Dictionary of Modern English Usage, Hart's Rules, and The Oxford Guide to English Usage—also recommend -ize. However, Robert Allan's Pocket Fowler's Modern English Usage considers either spelling to be acceptable anywhere but the US.

==== Usage ====
American spelling avoids -ise endings in words like organize, realize and recognize.

British spelling mostly uses -ise (organise, realise, recognise), though -ize is sometimes used. The ratio between -ise and -ize stood at 3:2 in the British National Corpus up to 2002. The spelling -ise is more commonly used in UK mass media and newspapers, including The Times (which switched conventions in 1992), The Daily Telegraph, The Economist and the BBC. The Government of the United Kingdom additionally uses -ise, stating "do not use Americanisms" justifying that the spelling "is often seen as such". The -ize form is known as Oxford spelling and is used in publications of the Oxford University Press, most notably the OED, and of other academic publishers such as Nature, the Biochemical Journal and The Times Literary Supplement. It can be identified using the IETF language tag en-GB-oxendict (or, historically, by en-GB-oed).

In Ireland, India, Australia, and New Zealand -ise spellings strongly prevail: the -ise form is preferred in Australian English at a ratio of about 3:1 according to the Macquarie Dictionary.

In Canada, the -ize ending is more common, although the Ontario Public School Spelling Book spelled most words in the -ize form, but allowed for duality with a page insert as late as the 1970s, noting that, although the -ize spelling was in fact the convention used in the OED, the choice to spell such words in the -ise form was a matter of personal preference; however, a pupil having made the decision, one way or the other, thereafter ought to write uniformly not only for a given word, but to apply that same uniformity consistently for all words where the option is found. Just as with -yze spellings, however, in Canada the ize form remains the preferred or more common spelling, though both can still be found, yet the -ise variation, once more common amongst older Canadians, is employed less and less often in favour of the -ize spelling. (The alternate convention offered as a matter of choice may have been due to the fact that although there were an increasing number of American- and British-based dictionaries with Canadian Editions by the late 1970s, these were largely only supplemental in terms of vocabulary with subsequent definitions. It was not until the mid-1990s that Canadian-based dictionaries became increasingly common.)

Worldwide, -ize endings prevail in scientific writing and are commonly used by many international organizations, such as United Nations Organizations (such as the World Health Organization and the International Civil Aviation Organization) and the International Organization for Standardization (but not by the Organisation for Economic Co-operation and Development). The European Union's style guides require the usage of -ise. Proofreaders at the EU's Publications Office ensure consistent spelling in official publications such as the Official Journal of the European Union (where legislation and other official documents are published), but the -ize spelling may be found in other documents.

The same applies to inflections and derivations such as colonised/colonized and modernisation/modernization.

==== Exceptions ====
- Some verbs take only an -ize form worldwide. In these, -ize is not a suffix, so does not ultimately come from Ancient Greek -ίζειν: for example, capsize, seize (except in the legal phrases to be seised of or to stand seised to), size and prize (meaning value, as opposed to the prise that means pry).
- Some verbs take only -s- worldwide. In these, -ise is not a suffix, but part of the English, French or Latin stems -mise-, -rise, -vise, etc.: advise, arise, chastise, circumcise, compromise, demise, despise, devise, disguise, excise, exercise, franchise, guise, improvise, incise, promise, reprise, revise, rise, surmise, televise, and wise. Less common -ize variants such as advertize, comprize, and surprize do exist in American English, but are rarer than the -ise forms.
- Some words spelled with -ize in American English are not used in British English. For example, from the noun burglar, the usual verb is formed by suffixation in American English (burglarize) but back-formation in British English (burgle).
- Conversely, the verb to prise (meaning "to force" or "to lever") is rarely used in North American English: pry is instead used, a back-formation from or alteration of prise to avoid confusion with the more common noun "prize". When it is used in Canada, it is spelled with an s, just as it is in British, Irish, Indian, New Zealand and European English, where its use is more common. However, the rare occurrences in the US have the spelling as prize even though it does not contain a suffix, so does not derive from -ίζειν. (Note: According to Merriam-Webster's Collegiate Dictionary, Eleventh Ed.: prise is a "chiefly Brit var of PRIZE".)
- The spelling enterprize was the dominant spelling throughout the 18th century; Royal Navy vessels such as HMS Enterprize (1743) also used this spelling. However, enterprize is now considered archaic and is no longer used in either British or American English.

=== -yse, -yze ===
The ending -yse is now British and -yze is American. Thus, in British English analyse, catalyse, hydrolyse and paralyse, but in American English analyze, catalyze, hydrolyze and paralyze.

Either ending is derived from the Greek noun stem λύσις lysis ("release") with the -ize/-ise suffix added to it, and not the original verb form, whose stem is λυ- ly- without the -s/z- segment. The OED states on that matter:

On Greek analogies the verb would have been analysize, French analysiser, of which [French] analyser was practically a shortened form, since, though following the analogy of pairs like annexe, annexe-r, it rested chiefly on the fact that by form-association it appeared already to belong to the series of factitive verbs in French -iser, English -ize, = Latin -īzāre, from Greek -ίζ-ειν, to which in sense it belonged. Hence from the first it was commonly written in Eng. analyze, the spelling accepted by Johnson, and historically quite defensible.

Alongside the authoritative Samuel Johnson's Dictionary, 1755, the spelling analyze was also preferred by John Kersey's of 1702 and Nathan Bailey's of 1721, both published in London. It is given, alongside analyse, as one of the two equally significant "main forms" in the first (published 1884–1928) and second (published 1989) editions of the OED.

In Canada, -yze is now generally preferred, but -yse is also very common. In South Africa, Australia and New Zealand, -yse is the prevailing form.

=== -ogue, -og ===
British and other Commonwealth English use the ending -logue while American English commonly uses the ending -log for words like analog(ue), catalog(ue), homolog(ue), etc., etymologically derived from Greek -λόγος -logos ("one who speaks (in a certain manner)"). The -gue spelling, as in catalogue, is used in the US, but catalog is more common. In contrast, dialogue, epilogue, prologue, and monologue are extremely common spellings compared to dialog etc. in American English, although both forms are treated as acceptable ways to spell the words (thus, the inflected forms, cataloged and cataloging vs. catalogued and cataloguing).

In American English, analog is the standard spelling for the adjective (e.g., analog signal), while analogue is sometimes preferred for the noun. According to Merriam-Webster's Collegiate Dictionary, analog is listed as the primary adjective form, and analogue as the principal noun form, with analog being labeled as a variant.

In Australia, both analogue and analog are current for the noun; in all other cases the -gue endings strongly prevail, for example monologue, except for such expressions as dialog box in computing, which are also used in other Commonwealth countries. In Australia, analog is used in its technical and electronic sense, as in analog electronics. In Canada and New Zealand, analogue is used, but analog has some currency as a technical term (e.g., in electronics, as in "analog electronics" as opposed to "digital electronics" and some video-game consoles might have an analog stick). The -ue is absent worldwide in related words like analogy, analogous, and analogist.

Words such as demagogue, pedagogue, and synagogue, from the Greek noun ἀγωγός agōgos ("guide"), are more commonly spelled with ‑ue in American English, though the shorter forms demagog, pedagog, and synagog also exist and are accepted variants.

Both British and American English use the spelling -gue with a silent -ue for certain words that are not part of the -ogue set, such as tongue, plague, vague, and league. In addition, when the -ue is not silent, as in the words argue, ague and segue, all varieties of English use -gue.

== Doubled consonants ==
The plural of the noun bus is usually buses, with busses a minor American variant. Conversely, inflections of the verb bus usually double the s in British usage (busses, bussed, bussing) but not American usage (buses, bused, busing). In Australia, both are common, with the American usage slightly more common.

=== Doubled in British English ===
The final consonant of an English word is sometimes doubled in both American and British spelling when adding a suffix beginning with a vowel, for example strip/stripped, which prevents confusion with stripe/striped and shows the difference in pronunciation (see digraph). Generally, this happens only when the word's final syllable is stressed and when it also ends with a lone vowel followed by a lone consonant. In British English, however, a final -l is often doubled even when the final syllable is unstressed. This exception is no longer usual in American English, seemingly because of Noah Webster. The -ll- spellings are nevertheless still deemed acceptable variants by both Merriam-Webster Collegiate and American Heritage dictionaries.

- The British English doubling is used for all inflections (-ed, -ing, -er, -est) and for the noun suffixes -er and -or. Therefore, British English usage is cancelled, counsellor, cruellest, labelled, modelling, quarrelled, signalling, traveller, and travelling. Americans typically use canceled, counselor, cruelest, labeled, modeling, quarreled, signaling, traveler, and traveling. However, for certain words such as cancelled, the -ll- spelling is acceptable in American English as well.
  - The word parallel keeps a single -l- in British English, as in American English (paralleling, unparalleled), to avoid the cluster -llell-.
  - Words with two vowels before a final l are also spelled with -ll- in British English before a suffix when the first vowel either acts as a consonant (equalling and initialled; in the United States, equaling or initialed), or belongs to a separate syllable (British di•alled and fu•el•ling; American di•aled and fue•ling).
    - British woollen is a further exception due to the double vowel (American: woolen). Also, wooly is accepted in American English, though woolly prevails in both systems.
    - The verb surveil, a back-formation from surveillance, always makes surveilled, surveilling.
- Endings -ize/-ise, -ism, -ist, -ish usually do not double the l in British English; for example, devilish, dualism, normalise, and novelist.
  - Exceptions: duellist, medallist, panellist, tranquillise, and sometimes triallist in British English.
- For -ous, British English has a single l in scandalous and perilous, but the "ll" in libellous and marvellous.
- For -ee, British English has libellee.
- For -age, British English has pupillage but vassalage.
- American English sometimes has an unstressed -ll-, as in the UK, in some words where the root has -l. These are cases where the change happens in the source language, which was often Latin. (Examples: bimetallism, cancellation, chancellor, crystallize, excellent, raillery, and tonsillitis.)
- All forms of English have compelled, excelling, propelled, rebelling (stressed -ll-); revealing, fooling (double vowel before the l); and hurling (consonant before the l).
- Canadian and Australian English mostly follow British usage.

Among consonants other than l, practice varies for some words, such as where the final syllable has secondary stress or an unreduced vowel. In the United States, the spellings kidnaped and worshiped, which were introduced by the Chicago Tribune in the 1920s, are common, but kidnapped and worshipped prevail. Kidnapped and worshipped are the only standard British spellings. However, focused is the predominant spelling in both British and American English, focussed being just a minor variant in British English.

==== Miscellaneous ====
- British calliper or caliper; American caliper.
- British chilli; American chili or occasionally chile. The original Mexican Spanish word is chile, itself derived from the Classical Nahuatl term chilli. In Merriam-Webster's Collegiate Dictionary, chile and chilli are given as also variants.
- British chlorophyll; American chlorophyll or chlorophyl
- British jewellery; American jewelry. The word originates from the Old French word jouel (whose contemporary French equivalent is joyau, with the same meaning). The standard pronunciation /ˈdʒuːəlri/ does not reflect this difference, but the non-standard pronunciation /ˈdʒuːləri/ (which exists in New Zealand and the United Kingdom, hence the Cockney rhyming slang word tomfoolery /tɒmˈfuːləri/) does. According to Fowler, jewelry used to be the "rhetorical and poetic" spelling in the UK, and was still used by The Times into the mid-20th century. Canada has both, but jewellery is more often used. Likewise, the Commonwealth (including Canada) has jeweller and the US has jeweler for a jewel(le)ry seller.

=== Doubled in American English ===
Conversely, there are words where British writers prefer a single l and Americans a double l. In American usage, the spelling of words is usually not changed when they form the main part (not prefix or suffix) of other words, especially in newly formed words and in words whose main part is in common use. Words with this spelling difference include appall, enrollment, fulfillment, installment, skillful, thralldom, willful. These words have monosyllabic cognates always written with -ll: pall (verb), roll, fill, stall, skill, thrall, will. Cases where a single l nevertheless occurs in both American and British English include null→annul, annulment; till→until (although some prefer til to reflect the single l in until, sometimes using a leading apostrophe ('til); this should be considered a hypercorrection as till predates the use of until); and others where the connection is not clear or the monosyllabic cognate is not in common use in American English (e.g., null is used mainly as a technical term in law, mathematics, and computer science).

In the UK, a single l is generally preferred over American forms distill, enroll, enthrall, and instill, although ll was formerly used; these are always spelled with ll in American usage. The former British spellings dulness, fulness, and instal are now quite rare. The Scottish tolbooth is cognate with tollbooth, but it has a distinct meaning.

In both American and British usages, words normally spelled -ll usually drop the second l when used as prefixes or suffixes, for example all→almighty, altogether; full→handful, useful; well→welcome, welfare; chill→chilblain.

Both the British fulfil and the American fulfill never use -ll- in the middle (i.e., *fullfill and *fullfil are incorrect).

Johnson wavered on this issue. His dictionary of 1755 lemmatizes distil and instill, downhil and uphill.

== Dropped "e" ==
British English sometimes keeps a silent "e" when adding suffixes where American English does not.

- When adding -ing to the verbs route, singe, swinge, dye, British English usually preserves the -e to distinguish from the -ing forms of rout, sing, swing, die. (Note: The past forms of rout and route are both spelled routed, but pronounced differently in British English, though usually identically in American English. The other verb pairs contrast dyed/died, singed/sung, swinged/swung.) In contrast, the American verb bathe and the British verb bath both form bathing. Of other -inge verbs, both forms of English vary for tinge and twinge, and prefer cringing, hinging, lunging, syringing.
- British prefers ageing, American usually aging. Both prefer ageism, but agism is also seen in American, though uncommon.
- Before -able, British English prefers likeable, liveable, rateable, saleable, sizeable, unshakeable, where American practice prefers to drop the "-e"; but both British and American English prefer breathable, curable, datable, lovable, movable, notable, provable, quotable, scalable, solvable, usable, and those where the root is polysyllabic, like believable or decidable. Both systems keep the silent "e" when it is needed to preserve a soft "c", "ch", or "g", such as in cacheable, changeable, traceable; both usually keep the "e" after "-dge", as in knowledgeable, unbridgeable, and unabridgeable ("These rights are unabridgeable").
- Both abridgment and the more regular abridgement are current in the US, only the latter in the UK. Likewise for the word lodg(e)ment. Both judgment and judgement are in use interchangeably everywhere, although the former prevails in the US and the latter prevails in the UK except in the legal profession, where judgment is standard. This also holds for abridgment and acknowledgment. Both systems prefer fledgling to fledgeling, but ridgeling to ridgling. Acknowledgment, acknowledgement, abridgment and abridgement are all used in Australia; the shorter forms are endorsed by the Australian Capital Territory Government. As a rule, "g" is hard unless followed by an "e", "i", or "y": aside from the preceding -dg- words, the few exceptions include mortgagor, gaol, margarine (variant), and such Latin æ words as algae.
- The suffix or pseudo-suffix -y in short words varies in both varieties of English; cases where British dictionaries give priority to -ey, but American ones do not, include fog(e)y, gam(e)y, mous(e)y, phon(e)y, pric(e)y, rop(e)y, stag(e)y.

== Different spellings for different meanings ==
	Meaning	Example	British	American	Notes	Etymology
dependant or dependent	adjective	A is dependent on B	dependent	dependent	dependant is also an acceptable variant for the noun form in the US.	
dependant or dependent	noun	A is a dependant	dependant	dependent	dependant is also an acceptable variant for the noun form in the US.	
disc or disk	optical discs		(computing) disc In computing, disc is used for optical discs (e.g., a CD, Compact Disc; DVD, Digital Versatile/Video Disc; MCA DiscoVision, LaserDisc), by choice of the group that coined and trademarked the name Compact Disc.		Traditionally, disc used to be British and disk American.	Both spellings are etymologically sound (Greek diskos, Latin discus), although disk is the earlier form.
disc or disk	other disks		disk In computing, disk is used for products using magnetic storage (e.g., hard disks or floppy disks, also known as diskettes).		Traditionally, disc used to be British and disk American.	Both spellings are etymologically sound (Greek diskos, Latin discus), although disk is the earlier form.
inquiry or enquiry	formal inquest	a formal inquiry	inquiry	inquiry (except for the National Enquirer)	Historically, inquiry and enquiry were equal alternatives. A strict distinction is made by Fowler, and is maintained by many (though not all) British writers. Interchangeable in Australian English	
inquiry or enquiry	act of questioning	to make enquiries	inquiry or enquiry	inquiry (except for the National Enquirer)	Historically, inquiry and enquiry were equal alternatives. A strict distinction is made by Fowler, and is maintained by many (though not all) British writers. Interchangeable in Australian English	
ensure or insure	to make sure, to make certain	to ensure the gates are shut	ensure		The Commonwealth distinction is only about a century old.	
ensure or insure	to make certain especially by taking necessary measures and precautions	to ensure the prisoner doesn't escape	ensure	insure	The Commonwealth distinction is only about a century old.	
ensure or insure	to provide or obtain insurance on or for	to insure a car	insure		The Commonwealth distinction is only about a century old.	
ensure or insure	to guarantee or protect against	to insure against danger	insure		The Commonwealth distinction is only about a century old.	
matt or matte	a non-glossy surface	a matt table	matt	matte		
matt or matte	the motion-picture technique	a matte shot	matte	matte		
programme or program	a leaflet listing information about a live event	a concert programme	programme (first appeared in England in 1671)	program (first appeared in Scotland in 1633, shared with Canadian English, though occasionally wholly replaced with -mme there)	New Zealand also follows the British pattern. Australia has followed the American pattern since the 1960s, which is listed as the official spelling in the Macquarie Dictionary; see also the name of The Micallef P(r)ogram(me).	The British programme is from post-classical Latin programma and French programme. The OED entry, updated in 2007, says that program conforms to the usual representation of Greek as in anagram, diagram, telegram etc.
programme or program	a computer program		program (occasionally programme)	program (first appeared in Scotland in 1633, shared with Canadian English, though occasionally wholly replaced with -mme there)	New Zealand also follows the British pattern. Australia has followed the American pattern since the 1960s, which is listed as the official spelling in the Macquarie Dictionary; see also the name of The Micallef P(r)ogram(me).	The British programme is from post-classical Latin programma and French programme. The OED entry, updated in 2007, says that program conforms to the usual representation of Greek as in anagram, diagram, telegram etc.
tonne or ton	SI unit (1,000 kilograms)	a metric tonne	tonne	ton	Canada uses either nomenclature.	
	long ton (2,240 pounds or 1,016 kilograms)		ton	N/A	The tonne and long ton differ by only 1.6%, and are roughly interchangeable when accuracy is not critical	
	short ton (2,000 pounds or 907 kilograms)		N/A	ton		
metre or meter (Note: The Metric Conversion Act of 1985 gives the Secretary of Commerce of the US the responsibility of interpreting or modifying the SI for use in the US. The Secretary of Commerce delegated this authority to the Director of the National Institute of Standards and Technology (NIST) (Turner, 2008 Archived 26 March 2009 at the Wayback Machine). In 2008, the NIST published the US version (Taylor and Thompson, 2008a Archived 3 June 2016 at the Wayback Machine) of the English text of the eighth edition of the International Bureau of Weights and Measures publication Le Système International d'Unités (SI) (BIPM, 2006). In the NIST publication, the spellings "meter", "liter", and "deka" are used rather than "metre", "litre", and "deca" as in the original BIPM English text (Taylor and Thompson, 2008a, p. iii). The Director of the NIST officially acknowledged this publication, together with Taylor and Thompson (2008b), as the "legal interpretation" of the SI for the United States (Turner, 2008 ).)	unit of length	a metre long	metre	meter	also the international spelling for the unit according to the SI brochure by the BIPM	
metre or meter	measuring device	a water meter	meter	meter		

== Different spellings for different pronunciations ==
In a few cases, essentially the same word has a different spelling that reflects a different pronunciation.

As well as the miscellaneous cases listed in the following table, the past tenses of some irregular verbs differ in both spelling and pronunciation, as with smelt (UK) versus smelled (US) (see American and British English grammatical differences § Verb morphology).

UK	US	Notes
aeroplane /ˈɛəɹəpleɪn/	airplane /ˈɛɚpleɪn/	Aeroplane, originally a French loanword with a different meaning, is the older spelling. The oldest recorded uses of the spelling airplane are British. According to the OED, "[a]irplane became the standard American term (replacing aeroplane) after this was adopted by the National Advisory Committee for Aeronautics in 1916. Although A. Lloyd James recommended its adoption by the BBC in 1928, it has until recently been no more than an occasional form in British English." In the British National Corpus, aeroplane outnumbers airplane by more than 7:1 in the UK. The case is similar for the British aerodrome and American airdrome; aerodrome is used merely as a technical term in Australia, Canada and New Zealand. The prefixes aero- and air- both mean air, with the first coming from the Ancient Greek word ἀήρ (āēr). Thus, the prefix appears in aeronautics, aerostatics, aerodynamics, aeronautical engineering and so on, while the second occurs invariably in aircraft, airport, airliner, airmail etc. In Canada, airplane is more common than aeroplane, although aeroplane is used as part of the regulatory term "ultra-light aeroplane".
aluminium /ˌæl(j)ʊˈmɪnjəm/	aluminum /əˈlumɪnəm/	The spelling aluminium is the international standard in the sciences according to the IUPAC recommendations. Humphry Davy, the element's discoverer, first proposed the name alumium, and then later aluminum. The name aluminium was finally adopted to conform with the -ium ending of some metallic elements. Canada uses aluminum and Australia and New Zealand aluminium, according to their respective dictionaries although the Canadian trade association is called the 'Aluminium Association of Canada'.
ampoule /ˈæmp(j)uːl/	ampoule, ampule, ampul /ˈæmpuːl/	The -poule spelling and /-puːl/ pronunciation, which reflect the word's French origin, are common in both the US and the UK, (Note: Merriam-Webster favours -poule and /-pjuːl/, AHD -pule and /-puːl/, with -pule and /-pjuːl/ being rare variants in the United Kingdom.)
arse /ɑːs/	ass /æs/	In vulgar senses "buttocks" ("rear end"/"wretch"/"idiot"); unrelated sense "donkey" is ass in both. Arse is very rarely used in the US, though often understood, whereas both are used in British English (with arse being considered vulgar). Arse is also used in Newfoundland.
behove /bɪˈhəʊv/	behoove /bɪˈhuːv/	The 19th century had the spelling behove pronounced to rhyme with move. Subsequently, a pronunciation spelling with doubled oo was adopted in the US, while in the United Kingdom a spelling pronunciation rhyming with rove was adopted.
bogeyman /ˈboʊɡimæn/	boogeyman /ˈbʊɡimæn/, boogerman /ˈbʊɡərmæn/	The American form, boogeyman, is reminiscent of musical boogie to the British ear. Both the British form, bogeyman, and the Southern US variation boogerman suggest the slang term bogey (UK) / booger (US) for nasal mucus, while the mainstream American spelling of boogeyman does not.
brent /bɹɛnt/	brant /bɹænt/	For the species of goose.
carburettor, carburetter /ˌkɑːrbjʊˈrɛtə/, /ˈkɑːrbərɛtə/	carburetor /ˈkɑːrbəreɪtər/	The word carburetor comes from the French carbure meaning "carbide".
charivari /ˌʃɑːɹɪˈvɑːɹi/	shivaree, charivari /ˌʃɪvəˈɹiː/	In the US, both terms are mainly regional. The pronunciation of /ʃɪvəˈɹiː/ is also found in Canada and Cornwall, and is a corruption of the French word.
closure /ˈkləʊʒə/	cloture /ˈkloʊt͡ʃɝ/	Motion in legislative or parliamentary procedure that quickly ends debate. Borrowed from the French clôture meaning "closure"; cloture remains the name used in the US. The American spelling was initially used when it was adopted into the UK in 1882 but was later changed to closure.
eyrie /ˈɪəɹi/	aerie, eyrie /ˈɛɹi/, /ˈɪəɹi/	Not to be confused with the adjective eerie. Rhymes with weary and hairy respectively.
fillet /ˈfɪlɪt/	fillet, filet /fɪˈleɪ/	Pronounced the French way (approximately) in the US; Canada follows British pronunciation and distinguishes between fillet, especially as concerns fish, and filet, as concerns certain cuts of beef. McDonald's in the UK and Australia use the US spelling "filet" for their Filet-O-Fish.
furore /fjʊəˈɹɔːɹi/	furor /ˈfjʊəɹɚ/	Furore is a late 18th-century Italian loanword that replaced the Latinate form in the UK in the following century, and is usually pronounced with a voiced final e. The Canadian usage is the same as the American, and Australia has both.
grotty /ˈgrɒti/	grody, groady /ˈɡɹoʊdi/	Clippings of grotesque; both are slang terms from the 1960s.
haulier /ˈhɔːliə/	hauler /ˈhɑlɚ/	Haulage contractor; haulier is the older spelling.
jemmy /ˈd͡ʒɛmi/	jimmy /ˈd͡ʒɪmi/	In the sense "crowbar".
mum(my) /mʌm/	mom(my) /mɒm/	Mom is sporadically regionally found in the UK (e.g., in West Midlands English). Some British and Irish dialects have mam, and this is often used in Northern English, Hiberno-English, and Welsh English. Scottish English may also use mam, ma, or maw. In the American region of New England, especially in the case of the Boston accent, the British pronunciation of mum is often retained, while it is still spelled mom. In Canada, there are both mom and mum; Canadians often say mum and write mom. In Australia and New Zealand, mum is used. In the sense of a preserved corpse, mummy is always used.
naivety, naïveté /nɑːˈiːv(ə)ti/	naïveté /nɑːˈiːv(ə)teɪ/	The American spelling is from French, and American speakers generally approximate the French pronunciation, whereas the British spelling conforms to English norms. In the UK, naïveté is a minor variant, used about 20% of the time in the British National Corpus; in the US, naivete and naiveté are marginal variants, and naivety is almost unattested.
orientated /ˈɔːɹiənteɪtɪd/	oriented /ˈɔːɹiɛntɪd/	In the UK, Australia and New Zealand, it is common to use orientated (as in family-orientated), whereas in the US, oriented is used exclusively (family-oriented). The same applies to the negative (disorientated, disoriented). Both words have the same origins, coming from "orient" or its offshoot "orientation".
pernickety /pəˈnɪkɪti/	persnickety /pɚˈsnɪkɪti/	Persnickety is a late 19th-century American alteration of the Scots word pernickety.
plonk /plɒŋk/	plunk /plʌŋk/	As verb meaning "sit/set down carelessly".
potter /ˈpɒtə/	putter /ˈpʌtɚ/	As verb meaning "perform minor agreeable tasks".
pyjamas /pɪˈd͡ʒɑːməz/	pajamas /pəˈd͡ʒæ.məz/	The y represents the pronunciation of the original Urdu term pāy-jāma, and in the 18th century spellings such as paijamahs and peijammahs appeared: this is reflected in the pronunciation /paɪˈdʒɑːməz/ (with the first syllable rhyming with pie) offered as an alternative in the first edition of the OED. Two spellings are also known from the 18th century, but pajama became more or less confined to the US. Canada follows both British and American usage, with both forms commonplace.
quin /kwɪn/	quint /kwɪnt/	Abbreviations of quintuplet.
scallywag /ˈskælɪwæɡ/	scalawag /ˈskæləwæɡ/, scallywag	In the United States (where the word originated, as scalawag), scallywag is not unknown.
sledge /slɛd͡ʒ/	sled /slɛd/	In American usage a sled is smaller and lighter than a sledge and is used only over ice or snow, especially for play by young people, whereas a sledge is used for hauling loads over ice, snow, grass, or rough terrain. Australia follows American usage.
speciality /ˌspɛʃiˈælɪti/	specialty /ˈspɛʃəlti/	In British English the standard usage is speciality, but specialty occurs in the field of medicine and also as a legal term for a contract under seal. In Canada, specialty prevails. In Australia and New Zealand, both are current.
titbit /ˈtɪtbɪt/	tidbit /ˈtɪdbɪt/	According to the OED, the oldest form was tyd bit, and the alteration to titbit was probably under the influence of the obsolete word tit, meaning a small horse or girl.

=== Past-tense differences ===
In the UK, Ireland, Australia, New Zealand and Canada, it is more common to end some past tense verbs with a "t" as in learnt or dreamt rather than learned or dreamed, though such spellings are also found in American English. However, in American English, burned and burnt have different usages.

Several verbs have different past tenses or past participles in American and British English:

- The past tense of the verb "to dive" is most commonly found as "dived" in British and New Zealand English. "Dove" is sometimes used in its place in American English. Both terms are understood in Canada and Australia, and may be found either in minority use or in regional dialect in the US.
- The past tense of the verb "to get" is "got" everywhere, but the past participle is "got" in British and New Zealand English but "gotten" in American and Canadian, and occasionally in Australian English. Both terms are understood, and may be found either in minority use or in regional dialect. One exception is in the phrase "ill-gotten", which is widely used everywhere. Another is the universal use of "have got" to indicate possession or necessity: "I have got a car", "I have got to go" (whereas "I have gotten a car" would mean "I have obtained a car", and "I have gotten to go" would mean "I have had the opportunity/privilege to go"). None of this affects "forget" and "beget", whose past participles are "forgotten" and "begotten" in all varieties.

== Miscellaneous spelling differences ==
In the table below, the main spellings are above the accepted alternative spellings.

United Kingdom (UK)	United States (US)	Remarks
adze	adze, adz	In British English, adze is the standard spelling. In American English, adz is an accepted variant, though adze is also widely used. The U.S. Government Publishing Office Style Manual prefers adz.
annexe, annex	annex	Annex is the verb in both British and American English. However, the noun—an annex(e) of a building—is spelled with an e at the end in the UK, but not in the US. Australia follows US usage.
apophthegm	apothegm	Johnson preferred apophthegm (the ph is silent), which matches Ancient Greek: ἁπόφθεγμα, romanized: apophthegma. Webster preferred apothegm, which matches Latin apothegma and was also more common in England until Johnson. There is an unrelated word spelled apothem in all varieties of English.
artefact, artifact	artifact	In British English, artefact is the main spelling and artifact a minor variant. In American English, artifact is the established spelling. Canadians prefer artifact and Australians artefact, according to their respective dictionaries. Artefact reflects arte-fact(um), the Latin source.
axe	axe, ax	For both the noun and verb. The word derives from Old English æx. In the US, both spellings are acceptable, though axe is more common. The OED states that "the spelling ax is better on every ground, of etymology, phonology, and analogy, than axe, which became prevalent in the 19th century; but it [ax] is now disused in the United Kingdom".
baulk	balk	
camomile, chamomile	chamomile	The word derives, via French and Latin, from Greek χαμαίμηλον ("earth apple"). The more common British spelling camomile, corresponding to the immediate French source, is the older English spelling, while chamomile more accurately corresponds to the ultimate Latin and Greek source. In the UK, according to the OED, "the spelling cha- is chiefly in pharmacy, after Latin; that with ca- is literary and popular". In the US, chamomile dominates in all senses.
carat	karat, carat	The spelling with a k is used in the US only for the measure of purity of gold. The c spelling is universal for weight.
cheque	check	For the banking medium, hence the terms paycheque (or pay cheque) and paycheck (or pay check). Accordingly, the North American term for what is known as a current account or cheque account in the UK is spelled chequing account in Canada and checking account in the US. Some American financial institutions, notably American Express, use cheque, but this is merely a trademarking affectation.
chequer	checker	As in chequerboard/checkerboard, chequered/checkered flag, etc. Checker is the more common spelling in Canada and Australia.
cipher, cypher	cipher	
corvette	corvette, corvet	
cosy	cozy	In all senses (adjective, noun, verb).
coulter	colter, coulter	
defuse	defuse, defuze	
dispatch, despatch	dispatch	
doughnut	doughnut, donut	In the US, both are used, with donut indicated as a less common variant of doughnut.
draught, draft	draft	British English usually uses draft for all senses as the verb; for a preliminary version of a document; for an order of payment (bank draft), and for military conscription (although this last meaning is not as common as in American English). It uses draught for a drink from a cask (draught beer); for animals used for pulling heavy loads (draught horse); for a current of air; for a ship's minimum depth of water to float; and for the game draughts, known as checkers in the US. It uses either draught or draft for a plan or sketch (but almost always draughtsman in this sense; a draftsman drafts legal documents). American English uses draft in all these cases. Canada uses both systems; in Australia, draft is used for technical drawings, is accepted for the "current of air" meaning, and is preferred by professionals in the nautical sense. The pronunciation is always the same for all meanings within a dialect (RP /drɑːft/, General American /dræft/). The spelling draught reflects the older pronunciation, /drɑːxt/; draft emerged in the 16th century to reflect the change in pronunciation.
dyke	dike	The spelling with an i is sometimes found in the UK, but the y spelling is rare in the US, where the y distinguishes dike in this sense from dyke, a slang term for a lesbian (sometimes considered a slur).
faggot	fagot, faggot	In the sense "a bundle of sticks", fagot is the preferred American spelling; the single-g spelling has existed since Middle English and is etymologically closer to French fagot. Merriam-Webster's Collegiate Dictionary lists only the offensive senses under faggot, while the non-slur senses appear exclusively under fagot, where faggot is also given as a variant for those senses.
font, fount	font	Fount was the standard British spelling for a metal type font (especially in the sense of one consignment of metal type in one style and size, e.g. "the printing company had a fount of that typeface"); it lasted until the end of the metal type era and is occasionally still seen. The spellings derive from French fondre, "to cast".
fuse	fuse, fuze	When referring to a cord or string used to ignite something, fuse is the established spelling, while fuze is a less common American variant.
gauge	gauge, gage	Both spellings have existed since Middle English.
gauntlet	gauntlet, gantlet	When meaning "ordeal", as in the phrase running the ga(u)ntlet, American style guides prefer gantlet. This spelling is unused in the UK and less usual in the US than gauntlet. The word is an alteration of the earlier term gantlope, by folk etymology with gauntlet (glove), which may be spelled either gauntlet or gantlet.
glycerine	glycerin	Scientists use the term glycerol.
gram, gramme	gram	The dated spelling gramme is sometimes used in the UK, but never in the US. (Kilo)gram is the only spelling used by the International Bureau of Weights and Measures. The same applies with metric prefixes such as decagram and hectogram.
grey	gray	Grey became the established British spelling in the 20th century, but it is a minor variant in American English, according to dictionaries. The two spellings are of equal antiquity, and the OED states that "each of the current spellings has some analogical support". Both Grey and Gray are found in proper nouns everywhere in the English-speaking world. The name of the dog breed greyhound is never spelled grayhound; the word descends from grighund.
grill, grille	grill, grille	In the US, grille refers to that of an automobile, whereas grill refers to a device used for heating food. However, it is not uncommon to see both spellings used in the automotive sense, as well as in Australia and New Zealand. Grill is more common overall in British and American English.
Gypsy, Gipsy	Gypsy	
hearken	hearken, harken	The word derives from hark. The spelling hearken was probably influenced by hear.
idyll	idyll, idyl	
jail, gaol	jail	In the UK, gaol and gaoler are sometimes used, apart from literary usage, chiefly to describe a medieval building and guard. Both spellings date back to Middle English: gaol was a loanword from Norman French, while jail was a loanword from central (Parisian) French. In Middle English, the two spellings were associated with different pronunciations. In modern English, the word, regardless of spelling, is always pronounced the way the jail spelling is, /dʒeɪl/. The survival of gaol in British English is "due to statutory and official tradition". In Australia, gaol is obsolete and only used in historical contexts (e.g. Maitland Gaol, although the modern spelling is used for the tourist attraction). Jail has been used throughout the 20th century and was made the preferred spelling by the Government Publishing Style Manual in 1978. However, while the terms jail and prison are commonly used in Australia, the term correctional facility is officially used by most state and territory governments.
kerb	curb	For the noun designating the edge of a roadway (or the edge of a British pavement/ American sidewalk/ Australian footpath). Curb is the older spelling and in all varieties of English, it is the only correct spelling for the verb meaning "restrain".
liquorice	licorice	The American spelling is closer to the Old French source licorece, which is ultimately from Greek glykyrrhiza. The British spelling was influenced by the unrelated word liquor. Licorice prevails in Canada and is common in Australia, but is rarely found in the UK. Liquorice is rarely found in the US (it is "chiefly British", according to dictionaries).
lupin	lupine, lupin	
mollusc	mollusk	The related adjective may be spelled molluscan or molluskan.
mould	mold	In all senses of the word. Both spellings have been used since the 16th century. In Canada, both spellings are used.
moult	molt	
moustache	mustache, moustache	In the US, according to Merriam-Webster's Collegiate Dictionary and The American Heritage Dictionary of the English Language, the British spelling is an accepted variant.
neuron, neurone	neuron	Neuron is now the established spelling in both British and American English. According to their dictionaries, Canada and Australia generally also use neuron.
omelette	omelet, omelette	Omelet is the older of the two, despite the term's etymology (French omelette). Omelette prevails in Canada and Australia.
pipette	pipette, pipet	The U.S. Government Publishing Office Style Manual prefers pipet.
plough	plow	Both spellings have existed since Middle English. In England, plough became the main spelling in the 18th century. Although plow was preferred by Noah Webster, plough continued to be used in the US, as implied by the entry in Webster's Third (1961). Newer dictionaries label plough as "chiefly British". The word snowplough/snowplow, originally an Americanism, predates Webster's dictionaries and was first recorded as snow plough. Canada uses both plough and plow, although snowplow is more common.
programme, program	program	While program is used in British English in the case of computer programs, programme is the spelling most commonly used for all other meanings. However, in American English, program is the preferred form for all senses. Australia follows US usage.
racquet, racket	racket	In the UK, racquet is the spelling for the item of sporting equipment, whereas racket is the spelling for the type of organized crime. In the US, racket is the standard for both terms, though an exception is that the sport of racquetball is spelled with the -qu spelling in all varieties of English. In Canada, racket is the preferred spelling, while Australia uses both.
sceptic, skeptic	skeptic	The American spelling skeptic, akin to Greek, is the earliest known spelling in English. It was preferred by Fowler and is used by many Canadians, where it is the earlier form. Sceptic also predates the European settlement of the US and follows the French sceptique and Latin scepticus. In the mid-18th century, Johnson's dictionary listed skeptic without comment or alternative, but this form has never been popular in the UK; sceptic, an equal variant in the old Webster's Third (1961), has now become "chiefly British". Australians generally follow British usage (with the notable exception of the Australian Skeptics). All spellings are pronounced with a /k/ (a hard c) at the start, though in French, the letter is silent and the word is pronounced as "septique".
slew, slue	slue	When meaning "to turn sharply; a sharp turn", the preferred spelling differs. When meaning "a great number", the spelling is usually slew in all varieties of English.
smoulder	smolder	Both spellings date back to the 16th century and have existed since Middle English.
storey, storeys	story, stories	For the level of a building. The letter e is used in the UK and Canada to differentiate between the levels of buildings and a story as a literary work. Story is the earlier spelling. The OED states that this word is "probably the same word as story [in its meaning of 'narrative'] though the development of sense is obscure." One of the first uses of the (now-British) spelling storey was by Harriet Beecher Stowe in 1852 (Uncle Tom's Cabin xxxii).
sulphate, sulfate	sulfate, sulphate	Sulfate is the more common variant in British English in scientific and technical usage; see sulfur, and the decisions of the International Union of Pure and Applied Chemistry (IUPAC) and the UK's Royal Society of Chemistry (RSC).
sulphur, sulfur	sulfur	Sulfur is the spelling preferred by the International Union of Pure and Applied Chemistry (IUPAC) since 1971 or 1990 and by the UK's Royal Society of Chemistry (RSC) since 1992. Sulfur is used by scientists in all countries and has been actively taught in chemistry in British schools since December 2000; however, sulphur prevails in British, Irish, and Australian English, and is also found in some American place names (e.g., Sulphur, Louisiana, and White Sulphur Springs, West Virginia). The use of f versus ph spellings continued in the UK until the 19th century, when the word was standardized as sulphur. On the other hand, sulfur is the form that was established in the US; Canada uses both. Oxford Dictionaries note that "in chemistry and other technical uses ... the -f- spelling is now the standard form for this and related words in British as well as US contexts, and is increasingly used in general contexts as well." Some American English usage guides suggest sulfur for technical usage and both sulfur and sulphur in common usage and in literature, but American dictionaries list sulphur as a less common or chiefly British variant.{{Efn|The Merriam-Webster Dictionary labels the spelling sulphur as chiefly British but contradicts this in the same entry's usage note by saying that both spellings are common in general usage in American English. The usage note also ignores the modern widespread British usage of the spelling sulfur in scientific and technical usage (reported e.g. by the Oxford Dictionaries): "The spelling sulfur predominates in United States technical usage, while both sulfur and sulphur are common in general usage. British usage tends to favor sulphur for all applications. The same pattern is seen in most of the words derived from sulfur." The usage note in the Merriam-Webster Unabridged Dictionary is more up to date: "The spelling sulfur now predominates in U.S. technical and general usage. British usage still tends to favor sulphur, but use of that spelling has decreased dramatically in recent decades and continues to do so. The growing preference for sulfur on both sides of the Atlantic is no doubt encouraged by the recommendations of the Union of Pure and Applied Chemistry and other organizations. The same pattern is seen in most of the words derived from sulfur." (Note: The contrasting spellings of the chemical elements Al and S result in the American spelling aluminum sulfide becoming aluminum sulphide in Canada and aluminium sulphide in older British usage.) The variation between f and ph spellings is also found in the word's ultimate source: Latin sulfur and sulphur, but this was due to the Hellenization of the original Latin word sulpur to sulphur in the erroneous belief that the Latin word derived from Greek. This spelling was later reinterpreted as representing an /f/ sound and resulted in sulfur, which appears in Latin toward the end of the Classical period. (The true Greek word for sulfur, θεῖον, is the source of the international chemical prefix thio-.) In 12th-century Anglo-French, the word became sulfre. In the 14th century, the erroneously Hellenized Latin ph was restored in Middle English sulphre. By the 15th century, both full Latin spelling variants sulfur and sulphur became common in English.
syrup	syrup, sirup	Sirup is a less common American variant.
through	through, thru	Thru is typically used in the US as shorthand for through. The spelling is acceptable in informal writing, but not for formal documents.
tyre	tire	For the outer portion of a wheel. In Canada, as in the US, tire is the older spelling, but both were used in the 15th and 16th centuries (for a metal tire). Tire became the established spelling in the 17th century, but tyre was revived in the UK in the 19th century for rubber/pneumatic tyres; this was possibly because it was used in some patent documents, though many continued to use tire for the iron variety. The Times newspaper was still using tire as late as 1905. For the verb meaning "to grow weary", both American and British English only use tire.
vice	vise	For the two-jawed workbench tool, Americans and Canadians retain the very old distinction between vise (the tool) and vice (the sin, and also the Latin prefix meaning a deputy), both of which are spelled vice in the UK and Australia. Regarding the "sin" and "deputy" senses of vice, all varieties of English use -c-. Thus, American English (and all other English varieties) writes vice admiral, vice president, and vice principal—never vise for these senses.
wagon, waggon	wagon	For the four-wheel vehicle pulled by draft animals and used for transporting items. Waggon was the dominant spelling in British English in the 19th century, but has mostly fallen out of use; however, both waggon and wagon are considered acceptable spellings in the UK.
whisky (Scotland), whiskey (Ireland)	whiskey, whisky	In the US, whiskey is dominant; whisky is encountered less frequently, but is used on the labels of some major brands (e.g., Early Times, George Dickel, Maker's Mark, and Old Forester) and in US federal regulations. In Canada, whisky is dominant. Often, the spelling is selected based on the origin of the product rather than the location of the intended readership; therefore, it can be considered a faux pas to write "Scotch whiskey" or "Irish whisky". Both derive from "uisce beatha" (Irish) and "uisge beatha" (Scottish), meaning "water of life".
xanthophyll	xanthophyll, xanthophyl	
yoghurt, yogurt, yoghourt	yogurt, yoghurt	Yoghurt is rarely used in the US, as is yoghourt in the UK. Although the Oxford Dictionaries have always preferred yogurt, yoghurt is prevalent in current British usage. In Canada, yogurt prevails despite the Canadian Oxford preferring yogourt, which has the advantage of satisfying bilingual (English and French) packaging requirements; the British spelling is dominant in Australia. The word derives from the Turkish language term yoğurt. The voiced velar fricative represented by ğ in the modern Turkish (Latinic) alphabet was traditionally written as gh in the Latin script of the Ottoman Turkish (Arabic) alphabet that was used before 1928.

== Compounds and hyphens ==
British English often prefers hyphenated compounds, such as anti-smoking, whereas American English discourages the use of hyphens in compounds where there is no compelling reason, so antismoking is much more common. Many dictionaries do not point out such differences. Canadian and Australian usage is mixed, although Commonwealth writers generally hyphenate compounds of the form noun plus phrase (such as editor-in-chief). Commander-in-chief prevails in all forms of English.

Compound verbs in British English are hyphenated more often than in American English.

- any more or anymore: in the sense "any longer", the single-word form is usual in North America and Australia but unusual elsewhere, at least in formal writing. Other senses always have the two-word form; thus, Americans distinguish "I couldn't love you anymore [so I left you]" from "I couldn't love you any more [than I already do]". In Hong Kong English, any more is always two words.
- for ever or forever: traditional British English usage makes a distinction between for ever, meaning for eternity (or a very long time into the future), as in "If you are waiting for income tax to be abolished you will probably have to wait for ever"; and forever, meaning continually, always, as in "They are forever arguing". In British usage, however, forever prevails in the "for eternity" sense as well, in spite of several style guides maintaining the distinction. American writers usually use forever regardless of which sense they intend (although forever in the sense of "continually" is comparatively rare in American English, having been displaced by always).
- near by or nearby: some British writers make the distinction between the adverbial near by, which is written as two words, as in, "No one was near by"; and the adjectival nearby, which is written as one, as in, "The nearby house". In American English, the one-word spelling is standard for both forms.
- per cent or percent: it can be correctly spelled as either one or two words, depending on the Anglophone country, but either spelling must always be consistent with its usage. British English predominantly spells it as two words, so does English in Ireland and countries in the Commonwealth of Nations such as Australia, Canada, and New Zealand. American English predominantly spells it as one word. Historically, it was spelled as two words in the United States, but its usage is diminishing; nevertheless it is a variant spelling in American English. The spelling difference is reflected in the style guides of newspapers and other media agencies in the US, Ireland, and countries of the Commonwealth of Nations.

== Capitalization ==
Acronyms pronounced as words are often written in title case by Commonwealth writers, but usually as upper case by Americans: for example, Nasa / NASA or Unicef / UNICEF. This does not apply to abbreviations that are pronounced as individual letters (referred to by some as "initialisms"), such as US, IBM, or PRC (the People's Republic of China), which are virtually always written as upper case. However, sometimes title case is still used in the UK, such as Pc (Police Constable).

Some initials are usually upper case in the US but lower case in the UK: liter/litre and its compounds (2 L or 25 mL vs 2 l or 25 ml); and ante meridiem and post meridiem (10 P.M. or 10 PM vs 10 p.m. or 10 pm). Both AM/PM and a.m./p.m. are acceptable in American English, but US style guides overwhelmingly prefer a.m./p.m.

== Punctuation ==
The use of quotation marks, also called inverted commas or speech marks, is complicated by the fact that there are two kinds: single quotation marks (') and double quotation marks ("). British usage, at one stage in the recent past, preferred single quotation marks for ordinary use, but double quotation marks are again now increasingly common; American usage has always preferred double quotation marks, as have Canadian, Australian, and New Zealand English. It is the practice to alternate the type of quotation marks used where there is a quotation within a quotation.

The convention used to be, and in American English still is, to put full stops (periods) and commas inside the quotation marks, irrespective of the sense. British style now prefers to punctuate according to the sense, in which punctuation marks only appear inside quotation marks if they were there in the original. Formal British English practice requires a full stop to be put inside the quotation marks if the quoted item is a full sentence that ends where the main sentence ends, but it is common to see the stop outside the ending quotation marks.

Contractions where the final letter is present are often written in British English without full stops/periods (Mr, Mrs, Dr, Fr, and St — for "Saint" but not for "Street"). Abbreviations where the final letter is not present generally do take full stops/periods (such as vol., etc., i.e., ed.); British English shares this convention with French: Mlle, Mme, Dr, Ste, but M. for Monsieur. In American and Canadian English, abbreviations like St., Ave., Mr., Mrs., Ms., Dr., and Jr., usually require full stops/periods.

== See also ==
- Australian English
- Canadian English
- English language in England
- English in the Commonwealth of Nations
- English orthography
- Hong Kong English
- Hiberno-English
- Indian English
- Malaysian English
- Manx English
- New Zealand English
- Philippine English
- Scottish English
- Singapore English
- South African English
