= L'Harmattan =

French publisher founded in 1975

Éditions L'Harmattan
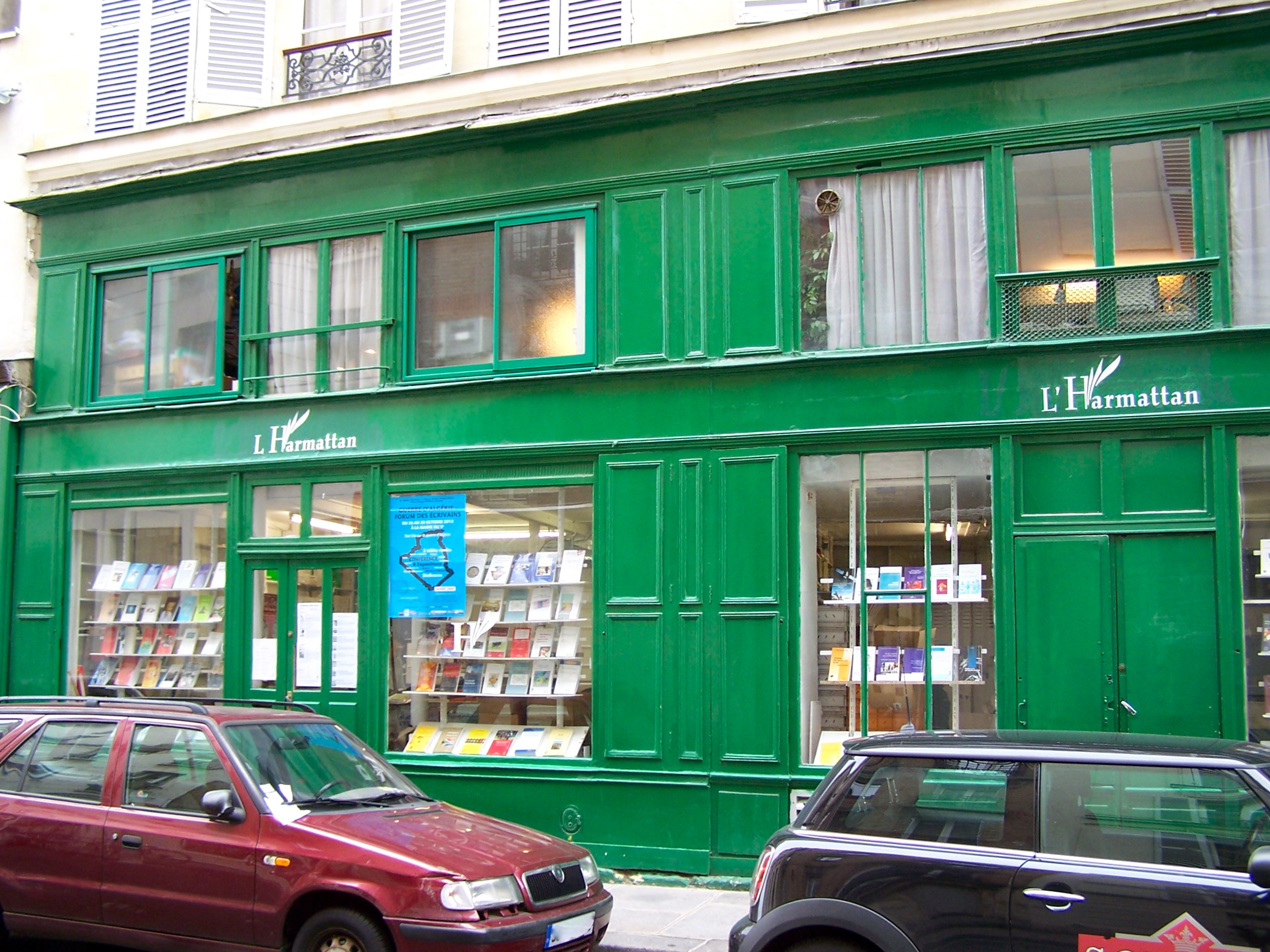
- L'Harmattan's headquarters in Paris, France
- Status: Active
- Founded: 1975; 50 years ago
- Founder: Robert Ageneau and Denis Pryen
- Country of origin: France
- Headquarters location: Paris
- Distribution: Worldwide
- Publication types: Books and magazines
- Nonfiction topics: Humanities
- Revenue: €7.638.700 (2018)
- Official website: www.harmattan.fr

Éditions L'Harmattan, usually known simply as L'Harmattan (French: [laʁmatɑ̃]), is one of the largest French book publishers, founded by Denis Pryen and Robert Ageneau in 1975. It specialises in non-fiction books with a particular focus on Sub-Saharan Africa. It is named after the Harmattan, a trade wind in West Africa.

Éditions L'Harmattan, which initially specialized in publishing French-language works in the humanities and social sciences, has four publishing houses in Europe, eleven in Africa, and two bookstores in Paris.

== Description ==
L'Harmattan was founded in 1975. In 2013 it produced 500 magazines and 2,000 new books per year, both in print and as e-books, and has a backlist of 38,000 books, 33,000 e-books, and 1,700 videos, with about a third each on Europe, Africa, and the rest of the world.

A third of its titles are in literature, a tenth in history, and 5 per cent each in philosophy, current affairs, education, politics, sociology, and fine arts. Slightly fewer are published in economics, psychology, ethnology, languages, etc., but even these categories have hundreds of titles, for example 500 in languages, and more languages taught than almost any other publisher.

L'Harmattan controls costs by requiring authors to prepare electronic manuscripts in final format, not paying royalties on the first few hundred copies, and having short print runs of only a few hundred for its most specialized books.

It has sales of 8.5 million euros per year, of which 2 million are exported.

== History ==
L'Harmattan was founded in 1975 by Robert Ageneau and Denis Pryen, two publishers with roots in the Christian left and Third World activism. Their goal was to publish works dealing with geopolitical relations between the Third World, developed countries, and Africa.

Denis Pryen was born in 1939 in northern France. Robert Ageneau, born in 1938 in Vendée, was editor-in-chief of Spiritus, a missionary magazine. The former is considered the businessman behind the project, while the latter is the intellectual. They set up their bookshop in Paris, in the Saint-Germain-des-Prés district.

L'Harmattan is based on the experiences of two publishing houses that were then in decline, François Maspero and Présence africaine. The newly created publishing house develops new themes around the evolution of African states, immigration, and the role of Christianity in development issues. L'Harmattan has established a network of relationships with nationalist movements, particularly in El Salvador, Timor, the West Indies, and Western Sahara. Its first publications included books on France's overseas territories, 1973 Chilean coup d'état, the Malagasy revolution, famine in the Sahel, and literature in African languages.

In 2010, Denis Pryen retired and appointed his nephew, Xavier Pryen, to head up the group's operational management. In 2024, the founder of the publishing house filed a lawsuit against his nephew, accusing him of taking control of the group without his knowledge and using its financial resources for his own gain. According to Mediapart, the Paris public prosecutor's office has opened two preliminary investigations into scam, abuse of weakness, and workplace bullying.

== Business model ==
The model was initially based on a volunteer network made up of university collection managers, but the company has become more professional over the years. In the beginning, promotion was carried out solely through presentations during the Fête de l'Humanité festival. In order to keep costs down, the company imposed a method known as "ready to print" in the 1980s, requiring authors to comply with the formats required by the publishing house. L'Harmattan recruits employees and initiates a publishing contract with 0% royalties on the first 500 copies. This business model is unique and sometimes criticized: authors are paid only, and poorly, from the 501st copy sold. In 1984, L'Harmattan employed 19 people.

For this small-scale distribution model to work, a large volume of books is required, which has enabled L'Harmattan to grow rapidly and successfully. However, this strategy is disapproved of by Robert Ageneau, who believes that it is detrimental to a qualitative and restrictive approach. Following a court ruling in 1980, Robert Ageneau left the company in 1980 to found his own publishing house, Éditions Karthala.

== Book series ==
In 2021, L'Harmattan was publishing 1,300 "collections" (book series), including the following:

- "Afrique au cœur des lettres" (series editor: Jean-Pierre Orban)
- "Éducateurs et Préventions" (series editor: Pascal Le Rest)
- "Parlons..." (series editor: Michel Malherbe) - a series of language and culture learning books
- "Poètes des cinq continents" (series editor: Philippe Tancelin)
- "Questions alimentaires et gastronomiques" (series editor: Kilien Stengel)
- "Questions autochtones" (series editors: Simone Dreyfus-Gamelon, Patrick Kulesza et Joëlle Chassin)
- "Questions contemporaines" (series editor: Bruno Péquignot)
- "Questions sociologiques" (series editors: François Hainard et Franz Schultheis)
- "Univers musical" (series editor: Anne-Marie Green)

== See also ==
- Éditions Karthala
- James Currey - a defunct English publisher, specialising in sub-Saharan Africa
- Academic publishing
- Electronic publishing
- Language education
- List of language self-study programs
- List of publishers of children's books
- Periodical literature
- Publishing
