= Calvin Veltman =

American sociologist, demographer and sociolinguist

Calvin Veltman (born 1941) is an American sociologist, demographer and sociolinguist at the Université du Québec à Montréal. He previously worked at the State University of New York at Plattsburgh. In the United States, his work on English use and acquisition among Hispanics is well known.

== Publications ==
=== The United States ===
- "Anglicization in the United States: the Importance of Parental Nativity and Language Practice", 1981 (International Journal of the Sociology of Language)
- "Anglicization in the United States: Language Environment and Language Practice of American Adolescents", 1983 (International Journal of the Sociology of Language)
- Language Shift in the United States, 1983 (Mouton-de Gruyter)
- L'avenir du français aux États-Unis, 1987 (Conseil de la langue française, Québec)
- The Future of the Spanish Language in the United States, 1988 (Hispanic Policy Development Project)
- "Modelling the Language Shift Process of Hispanic Immigrants", 1989 (International Migration Review)
- "The Status of the Spanish Language in the United States at the Beginning of the 21st Century", 1990 (International Migration Review)
- "The American Linguistic Mosaic: Understanding Languages Shift in the United States", 2000 (in McKay and Wong, eds)

=== Quebec (Canada) ===
- Les Grecs du quartier Parc Extension, 1984 (Institut national de la recherche scientifique: urbanisation)
- L'intégration sociolinguistique des Québécois d'origine portugaise, 1985 (Institut national de la recherche scientifique: urbanisation)
- L'adaptation des immigrants de la décennie 1980, 1993 (Ministère des communautés culturelles et de l'immigration, Québec)
- "Using Field Methods to Assess the Validity of the Canadian Census", 1985 (in P. Nelde, ed.)
- "The English Language in Quebec, 1940-1990", 1995 (in Fishman, ed.)
- "The Interpretation of the Language Questions of the Canadian Census", 1985 (Canadian Review of Sociology and Anthropology)
- "Assessing the Impact of Quebec's Language Legislation", 1986 (Canadian Public Policy
- Concentration ethnique et usages linguistiques en milieu scolaire, 1999 (Immigration et métropoles)
- Veltman, Calvin, and Andrew Hund. "Confirming Good Theory with Bad Data : l'anglicisation des hispanoaméricains." Demographie et Cultures. (https://web.archive.org/web/20070323183821/http://www-aidelf.ined.fr/colloques/ Quebec/aidelf-2008/IMG/pdf/VELTMANT.pdf). [In French] 2008.

=== Alsace (France) ===
- Le déclin du dialecte alsacien, 1989 (Presses universitaires de Strasbourg)
- "La régression du dialecte", 1982 (Institut Nationale de la Statistique et des Études Économiques)
- "La transmission de l'alsacien dans le milieu familial", 1983 (Revue des sciences sociales de la France de l'Est)
- "L'usage de l'alsacien du milieu urbain", 1984 (Actes du IIe colloque internationale des démographes de langue française)
- "Assimilation linguistique des alsaciens: politiques officielles, évolution, tendances actuelles", 1987 (Éditions de l'ORSTOM)
- "Usages linguistiques en Alsace : présentation d'une enquête et premiers résultats", 1988 (International Journal of the Sociology of Language)
