= Marc Meneau =

French chef (1943–2020)

- Born: 16 March 1943; Avallon, Yonne, France
- Died: 9 December 2020 (aged 77); Auxerre, France
- Culinary career
- Ratings: Michelin stars (former); Gault et Millau (19/20)
- Current restaurant: L'Espérance
- Website: www.marc-meneau-esperance.com

Marc Meneau (16 March 1943 – 9 December 2020) was a French chef, who earned three stars from the Guide Michelin. He was the chef of the restaurant L'Espérance located in Saint-Père, Yonne.

== Early life ==
Meneau was born in Avallon on 16 March 1943.

A native of Burgundy, Meneau never really departed his native region. Going to Strasbourg in 1961 to join a hotel school, he then returned to take over the grocery store of his mother, Marguerite, located in Saint-Père in the town of Vézelay. With the help of his wife Françoise (daughter of a Burgundian restaurant owner) and as a self-taught cooking chef, he transformed it into a restaurant and started inventing recipes which he published soon after. He was eager to learn and started looking at books of old cuisine chefs, which helped him develop into a famous chef specialized in old cuisine.

== Career ==
He received his first Michelin star in 1972 and decided to move his restaurant to a larger premises that he named L'Espérance. In 1975 he received his second Michelin star. In 1983, he was elected the best French chef of the year (Meilleur Cuisinier Français de l'Année) and received a third Michelin star and the grade of 19/20 at the Gault et Millau. He planted 16 hectares of vine to give another life to the famous wine Bourgogne-Vézelay (AOC). However, he lost his third Michelin star in 1999.

In 2003, he created the EntreVignes, a bistro opposite of his restaurant, an idea given by Serge Gainsbourg, who was familiar with the area. The in 2004, Marc Meneau got his third Michelin star back.

By 2007, Meneau had several financial problems and the bankruptcy of his business. This led to the Michelin Guide deleting his entry from its 2007 edition, assuming that the business of Marc Meneau was about to close. However, L'Espérance continued to trade and appeared again in the Michelin Guide with its two stars. In 2010, Marc Meneau planted his own kitchen garden, which is certified, in the park of his restaurant L'Espérance.

== Death ==
He died from COVID-19 during the COVID-19 pandemic in France on 9 December 2020.

== Honours ==
- 1983 : Meilleur Cuisinier de l'Année by the guide Gault-Millau (elected)
- 1985 : Chevalier des Arts et des Lettres (named)
- 1987 : Chevalier (Knight) of the National Order of Merit (named)
- 1988 : Meilleur Chef de l'Année by the magazine Le Chef (elected)
- 1993 : Officer (Officier) of the National Order of Merit (named)
- 1998 : Chevalier (Knight) of the Legion of Honour (named)
- 2012 : elected Talent d'Or at the Talents du Luxe et de la Création

== Followers ==
Chefs were trained by Marc Meneau

- Ludo Lefebvre
- Kilien Stengel

== Filmography ==
- 2000 : Vatel by Roland Joffé with Gérard Depardieu as François Vatel : elaboration of the gargantuan buffets of the film
- 2006 : Marie Antoinette by Sofia Coppola : ballet of the buffets

== See also ==
- List of Michelin starred restaurants
