= HMS Enterprize (1743) =

Sloop of the Royal Navy

History

Great Britain
- Name: HMS Enterprise
- Acquired: Captured from the Spanish in 1743
- Commissioned: 1743
- Fate: Sold in 1748

General characteristics
- Class & type: Ex-Barca-longa; Re-rated as a sloop
- Propulsion: Sails
- Sail plan: sloop
- Complement: 60
- Armament: 8 guns

HMS Enterprize, also known as HMS Enterprise, was an 8-gun sloop of the Royal Navy.

Enterprize was a barca-longa captured from the Spanish in 1743 and re-rated as a sloop. She spent her entire career in the Mediterranean as a despatch vessel and tender, being commissioned in 1743 under Lieutenant Thomas Herring. She was present at the Battle of Toulon in 1744 and was then paid off in 1745.

She was recommissioned under Lieutenant William Cooper in August 1746, spending a further two years in service with the Navy until being put up for sale in at Port Mahon, Menorca in the summer of 1748. There was already an HMS Enterprize in service during her time with the Navy, a 40-gun fifth rate, which was sold off the year after her smaller counterpart, in 1749.
