= Barca-longa =

Ship type

A barca-longa (1600s, also barqua-; 1600s–1700s barco-longo) was a two- or three-masted lugger used near the coasts of Spain and Portugal, and more widely in the Mediterranean Sea. Barca-longas were used in Spain and Portugal for fishing, and were employed by the Royal Navy in Mediterranean waters for shore raids or as dispatch boats. In general, they were not in Royal Navy ownership. The Oxford English Dictionary's earliest reference is from 1681.
