= Analyse =

Analyse or analyze may refer to:

- Analyse, to do or make an analysis (disambiguation)
- "Analyse" (Thom Yorke song), a song by Thom Yorke from the 2006 album The Eraser
- "Analyse" (The Cranberries song), a song by The Cranberries from the 2001 album Wake Up and Smell the Coffee
- Analyze (imaging software)
