= Oxford spelling =

Spelling standard used by Oxford University Press

Oxford spelling (also Oxford English Dictionary spelling, Oxford style, or Oxford English spelling) is a British spelling standard, named after its use by the Oxford University Press. It uses the letter -z- in Greek-derived words with the suffix -ize/-ise (in words such as realize and organization) instead of the -s- variant used by other British dictionaries and style guides. This spelling is chosen to more closely reflect the origins in the Greek suffix ‑ίζω (‑ízō).

Oxford spelling is used by many UK-based academic journals (for example, Nature) and many international organizations (for example, the United Nations and its agencies). It is common for academic, formal, and technical writing for an international readership. In digital documents, Oxford spelling may be indicated by the IETF language tag en-GB-oxendict (or historically by en-GB-oed).

== Defining feature ==
Oxford spelling uses the spelling ‑ize alongside ‑lyse: organization, realize, privatize and recognizable, rather than organisation, realise, privatise and recognisable – but analyse and paralyse. Words such as advise, advertise, improvise, surprise are spelled thus in all varieties of English, since ‑ise in them is not a suffix, but a part of an English or French root.

The ‑ize spelling of the suffix has been attested in British English over centuries. The Oxford spelling affects about 200 verbs and is favoured on etymological grounds, in that ‑ize corresponds more closely to the Greek etymon, ‑ίζω (‑ízō).

The spelling ‑ize has been in use in the UK since the 15th century, and is the spelling variation used in North American English. The Oxford English Dictionary lists the ‑ise form of words separately, as "a frequent spelling of ‑IZE ...":

This practice probably began first in French; in modern French the suffix has become ‑iser, alike in words from Greek, as baptiser, évangéliser, organiser, and those formed after them from Latin, as civiliser, cicatriser, humaniser.

Hence, some have used the spelling ‑ise in English, as in French, for all these words, and some prefer ‑ise in words formed in French or English from Latin elements, retaining ‑ize for those formed from Greek elements.

However, the suffix itself, whatever the element to which it is added, is in its origin the Greek ‑ιζειν, Latin ‑izāre; and, as the pronunciation is also with z, there is no reason why in English the special French spelling should be followed, in opposition to that which is at once etymological and phonetic. In this Dictionary the termination is uniformly written ‑ize.

=== -lyse spelling ===
The Oxford use of ‑ize does not extend to the spelling of words not traced to the Greek ‑ízō suffix. This includes a number of words ending in ‑lyse, such as analyse and paralyse, which are derived from the Greek noun stem λύσις (lysis, 'release'). These are spelled with s in Oxford spelling and British English in general, while American and Canadian English have adopted them with z (analyze, paralyze).

== Usage ==
Oxford spelling is used by the Oxford University Press (OUP) for British publications, including its Oxford English Dictionary and its influential British style guide Hart's Rules, and by other publishers who are "etymology conscious", according to Merriam-Webster. In addition to the OUP's "Oxford"-branded dictionaries, other British dictionary publishers that list ‑ize suffixes first include Cassell, Collins, and Longman.

Oxford spelling (especially the first form listed in the Concise Oxford English Dictionary, Twelfth Edition) is the official or de facto spelling standard used in style guides of the international organizations that belong to the United Nations System. This includes the World Health Organization, the International Telecommunication Union, the International Labour Organization, the World Food Programme, the International Court of Justice, and UNESCO, and all UN treaties and declarations, such as the Universal Declaration of Human Rights.

Other international organizations that adhere to this standard include the International Organization for Standardization (ISO), the International Electrotechnical Commission (IEC), the World Trade Organization (WTO), the North Atlantic Treaty Organization (NATO), the International Atomic Energy Agency (IAEA), Interpol, the International Committee of the Red Cross (ICRC), the World Wide Fund for Nature (WWF), Amnesty International (AI), the World Economic Forum (WEF), and the Global Biodiversity Information Facility (GBIF).

Oxford spelling is used in a number of academic publications, including the London-based scientific journal Nature and all other UK-based "Nature"-branded journals, the Philosophical Transactions of the Royal Society, and the Journal of Physiology. It is used by The Times Literary Supplement, Encyclopædia Britannica, and Cambridge University Press. Newspapers and magazines in the UK normally use ‑ise. The style guide of The Times recommended ‑ize until 1992, when it switched to ‑ise. The newspaper's chief revise editor, Richard Dixon, wrote of the change:

In the great -ize versus -ise debate, The Times has opted latterly for simplicity over a sort of erudition ... But in the Style Guide of 1992, the following entry appeared: "-ise, -isation: avoid the z construction in almost all cases. This is volcanic ground, with common usage straining the crust of classical etymology. This guidance is a revision of the Greek zeta root ending in the direction of a Latin ending and common usage: apologise, organise, emphasise, televise, circumcise. The only truly awkward result is capsize, which should be left in its Grecian peace."

In both the King James Bible and the works of Shakespeare, -ize endings are used throughout. Well-known literary works that use Oxford spelling include The Lord of the Rings by J. R. R. Tolkien, And Then There Were None by Agatha Christie, and The Lion, the Witch and the Wardrobe by C. S. Lewis.

The "Oxford" commonly used to describe the spelling refers to the Oxford University Press, not to the University of Oxford, to which the press belongs. Indeed the university's own style guide recommends using -ise because it "is more common in British usage and requires fewer exceptions".

== Language tag comparison ==
The Internet Engineering Task Force uses language tags to categorize languages. Five of the English spelling conventions and the French spelling convention are given for comparison. The en-GB tag stands for British English; it is not specified whether -ize or -ise should be used in a given instance. The en-GB-oxendict tag uses -ize and -ization.

Comparison of English spelling of selected words
Australian en-AU	British en-GB	Oxford en-GB-oxendict	Canadian en-CA	American en-US	cf. closest French fr-FR
organisation		organization			organisation
realise		realize			réaliser
behaviour (Note: Labor Party and Victor Harbor are exceptions to the typical spelling in Australian English, having had their names established before convergence on the British -our spelling convention.)	behaviour			behavior	comportement (Note: "Behaviour" is ultimately of Germanic origin in English, with the ‑iour spelling apparently being a hyperforeignism, likely the obsolete form haviour being interpreted as cognate with French avoir.)
colourise		colourize		colorize	couleur, coloriser
analyse			analyze		analyser
routing	routeing		routing		routage
catalogue				catalogue, catalog	catalogue
centre				center	centre
defence				defense	défense
licence (noun)				license (noun and verb)	licence (noun)
license (verb)				license (noun and verb)	licencier (verb)
program (all uses)	programme (non-computer)		program (all uses, but programme for non-computer is acceptable)	program (all uses)	programme
program (all uses)	program (computer code/application)		program (all uses, but programme for non-computer is acceptable)	program (all uses)	programme
traveller				traveler	travailleur (worker)

== See also ==
- Oxford comma – Comma before the conjunction in a list
- American and British English spelling differences § -ise, -ize (-isation, -ization)
- American English § Grammar and orthography
- Canadian English § Spelling
- Macquarie Dictionary – Dictionary of Australian English

== Bibliography ==
- The Oxford English Dictionary, 1st ed. (1884)
- The Oxford English Dictionary, 2nd ed. (1989, 20 vols.)
- The Oxford English Dictionary, Oxford: Oxford University Press (latest, continually updated edition, online)
