= Revue des Sciences Sociales (France) =

The Revue des sciences sociales, formerly Revue des sciences sociales de la France de l'Est, is a French-language journal in social sciences (mainly sociology, ethnology and demography), founded in 1972 by Julien Freund, a French sociologist known for its works on conflicts. It is published by the Social Science Department of the University of Strasbourg (France) and by the CNRS research unit "Dynamiques Européennes UMR 7367 CNRS/UdS". Since 2005, the journal publishes two issues per year, collecting articles on a given theme, edited by guest editors. Abstract of the articles are available in English, French, and German in the printed issue and on the website of the journal. The current scientific director is Nicoletta Diasio, with Vulca Fidolini, Christophe Humbert and Virginie Wolff as editors, all from University of Strasbourg.
