= KRDG (AM) =

Redding, California; United States
- Frequency: 1330 kHz

Programming
- Format: Contemporary Christian music

Ownership
- Owner: Prather-Breck Broadcasting of California, Inc.

History
- First air date: June 3, 1958
- Last air date: November 1994
- Former call signs: KPAP (1958–1961); KAHR (1961–1969); KCLM (1969–1987)
- Former frequencies: 1270 kHz (1958–1961)

Technical information
- Power: 5,000 watts daytime
- Transmitter coordinates: 40°31′27″N 122°22′15″W

KRDG (1330 AM) was a radio station in Redding, California, United States. It was last owned by Prather-Breck Broadcasting of California and broadcast from 1958 to 1994. It broadcast primarily country music over the course of history, though its last format was contemporary Christian music.

== History ==
C. E. Wilson and Philip D. Jackson, doing business as independent broadcasters, were granted a construction permit by the Federal Communications Commission (FCC) on June 6, 1957, for a new 1,000-watt, daytime-only radio station to serve Redding. Wilson sold his interest to his partner before launch, and Jackson built and started KPAP, which began broadcasting June 3, 1958, as the town's fourth radio station, with a format consisting of pop and country music. Jackson owned the station scarcely a month before filing to sell it to High Fidelity Stations, Inc., which in turn was granted a move to 1330 kHz and a power increase to 5,000 watts in 1960. On February 1, 1961, KPAP changed its call sign to KAHR, continuing with its country format. The frequency change was completed on October 10 of that year. On April Fool's Day 1966, KVIP (540 AM) and KAHR engaged in a prank by which the two stations switched signals for the day; lines were run between the two stations to allow them to broadcast each other's programming. Callers flooded both stations' switchboards, one even thinking the stunt was a "John Birch Society plot", as the event led to what KVIP manager Donald Chamberlain termed "mass confusion".

While High Fidelity made a deal to buy an FM station construction permit at 92.9 MHz in 1966, nothing ever came of the purchase. Instead, High Fidelity found itself in bankruptcy, and the buyer caused a series of shuffles in Redding radio. California Northwest Broadcasting Company, the McConnell family and owners of KVIQ-TV in Eureka, had the winning bid of $55,000 in bankruptcy court in February 1968. McConnell was also a shareholder in Shasta Broadcasting Corporation, which owned KVIP. As McConnell promised to divest himself of KVIP, a series of KVIP staff left that station and came to KAHR to stabilize the financially ailing operation. The station by this time had a full-time country music format. While KVIP stockholders decided to sell, and the station ultimately was silent for nearly a year before being purchased by a religious group, KAHR changed to KCLM (for "Carl and Leah McConnell") on February 10, 1969.

The McConnells sold KCLM to Colgan Communications Corporation in 1976. The owner, John A. Colgan, was a former advertising salesman for The Wall Street Journal and U.S. News & World Report. Colgan filed for a construction permit to build an FM station in addition to KCLM, which ended in a settlement whereby Colgan received a 19 percent stake in KSHA (104.3 FM), which started in 1981. While a sale agreement was reached that same year to sell the station to Walls and Jones Broadcasting of Tulare, no deal was ever concluded, and after John Colgan died at 55 in August 1982, the station was left without the promotional budget to compete against other country music stations and in an increasingly FM-oriented market.

Larry and Mildred DeBeau, who had previously owned stations in Michigan and Florida, filed in 1984 to acquire KCLM from Colgan's estate for $400,000. The DeBeaus installed an "uptempo easy listening" format on the station, relocated it to new studios, and converted it to broadcast C-QUAM stereo, the first in the Redding area. The call sign was retained, with the station branding as "K-Calm". The DeBeaus sold the station after less than a year to Jeffrey Broadcasting—owned by two couples from Walnut Grove—because their son opted to remain a law enforcement official in Florida instead of moving to Redding to run KCLM.

In January 1987, Prather-Breck Broadcasting, a partnership of two Redding men that owned KEWB (94.7 FM) in Anderson, acquired KCLM from Jeffrey Broadcasting. They replaced the existing easy listening format with oldies and acquired a set of heritage call letters: KRDG, which at 1230 AM had belonged to Redding's heritage Top 40 station in the 1950s and 1960s. In 1989, Prather and Breck sold KEWB to another company but retained KRDG. A year later, the station dropped its oldies format and flipped to contemporary Christian music, taking a feed from KLVR in Santa Rosa.

In 1991, Prather-Breck filed to sell KRDG to the owner of KLVR, the Educational Media Foundation, for $46,000. No transaction ever closed, and in July 1996, the license was deleted, with the FCC noting that it had last broadcast in November 1994.
