= Redding, California =

City in California, United States

- City
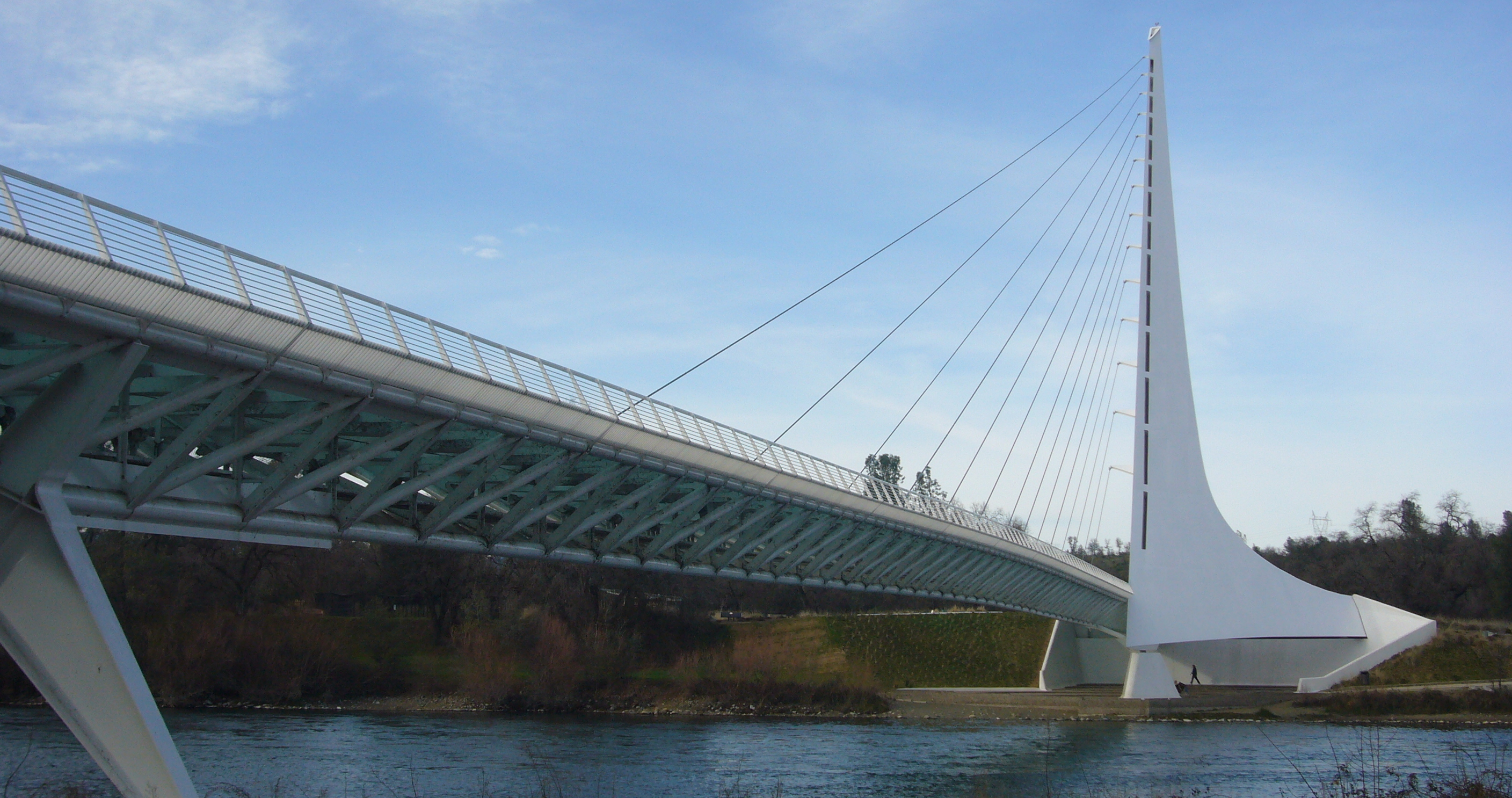
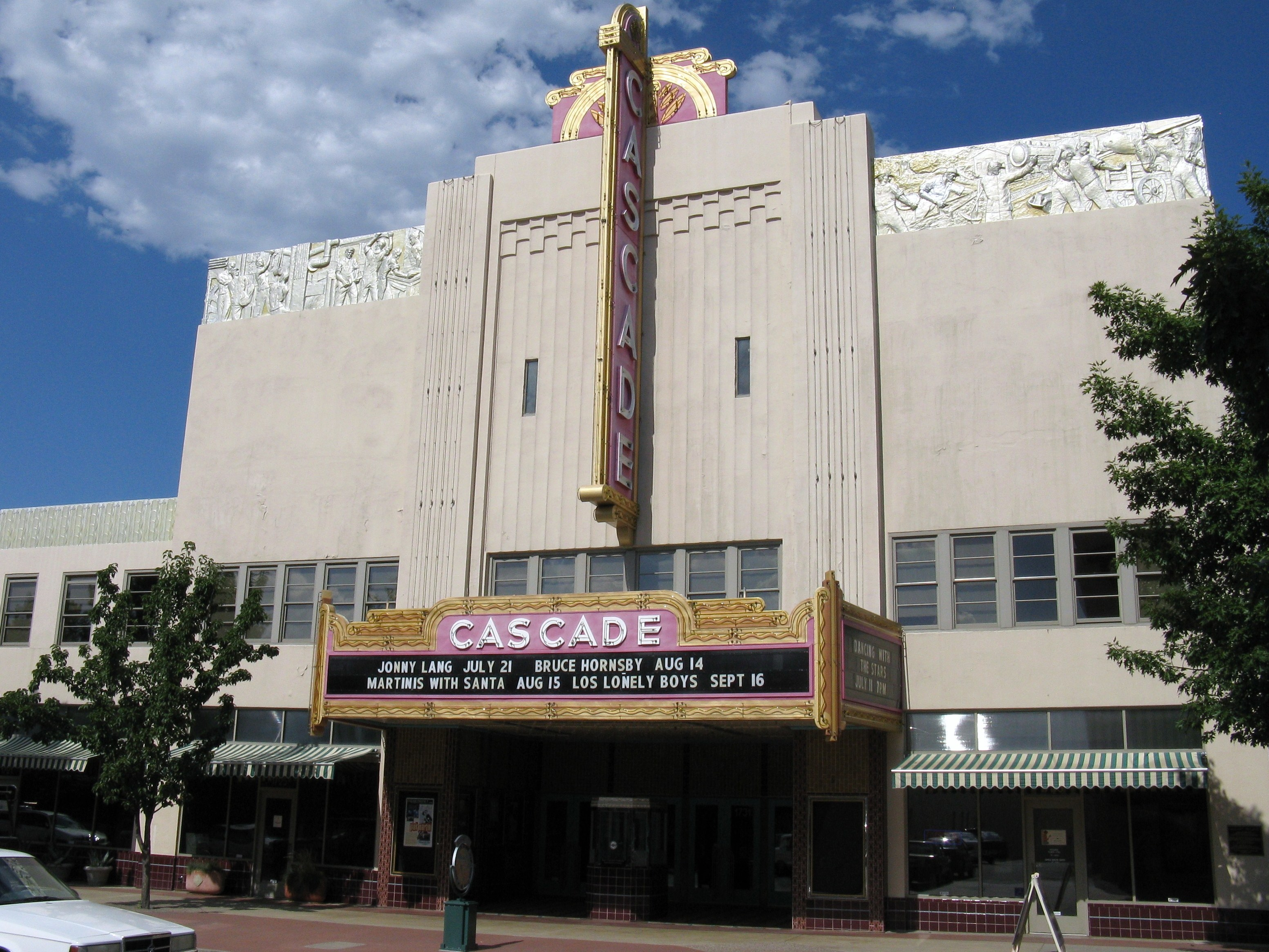
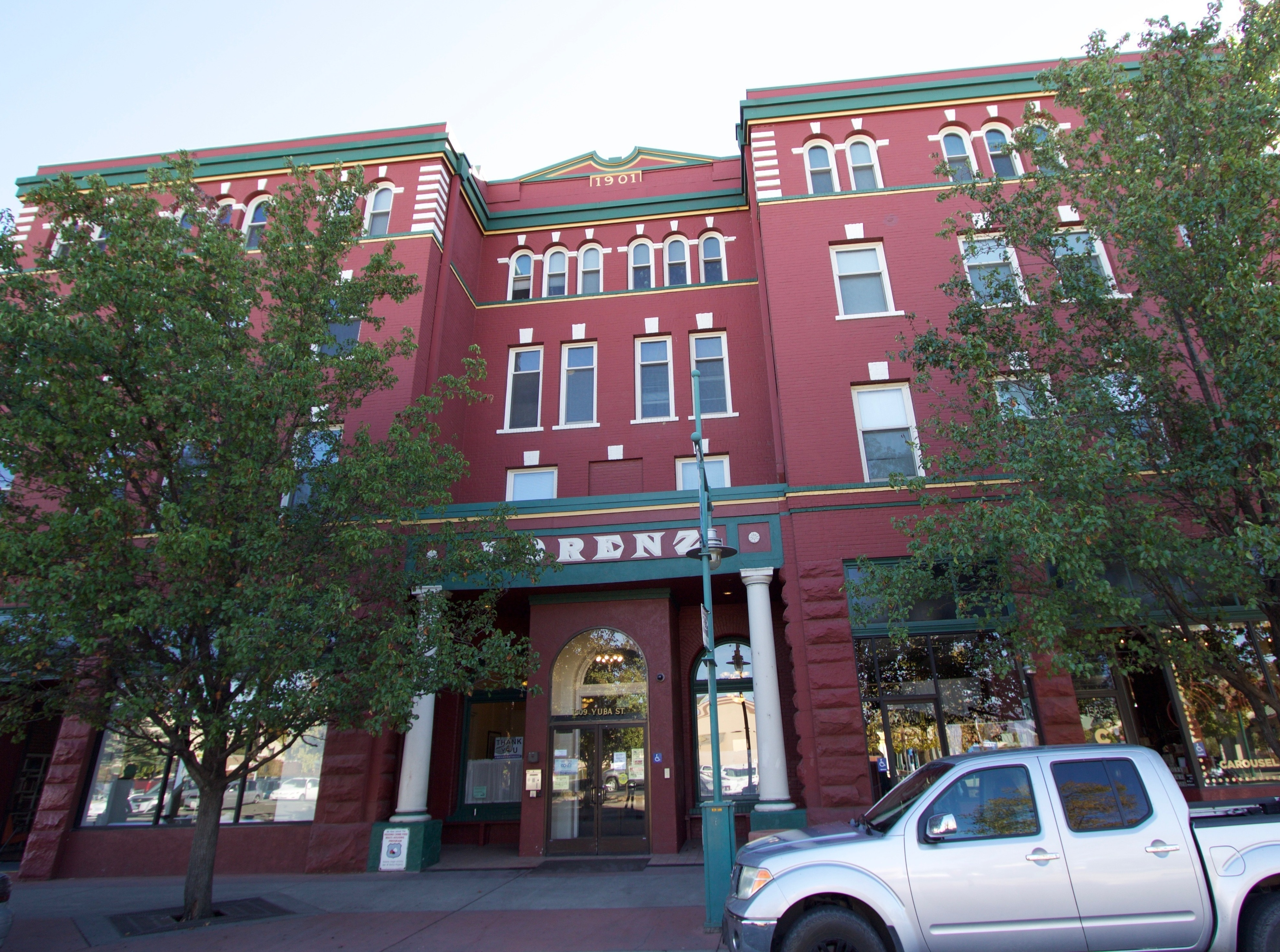
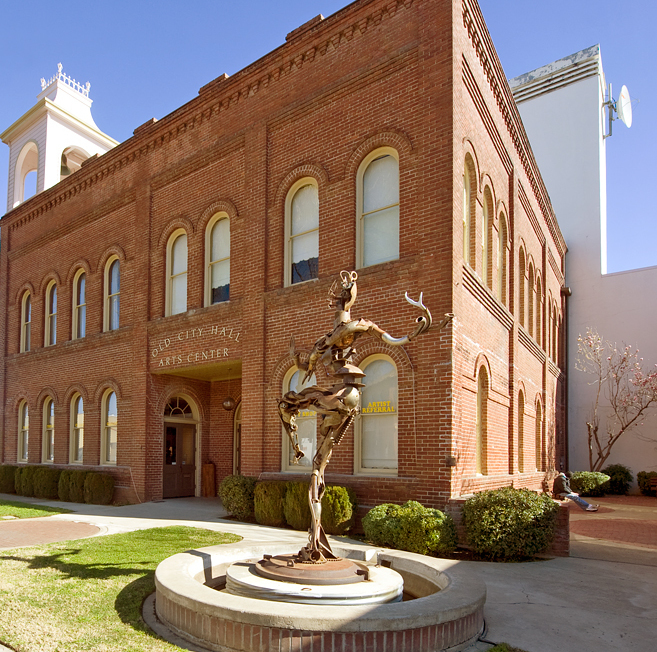
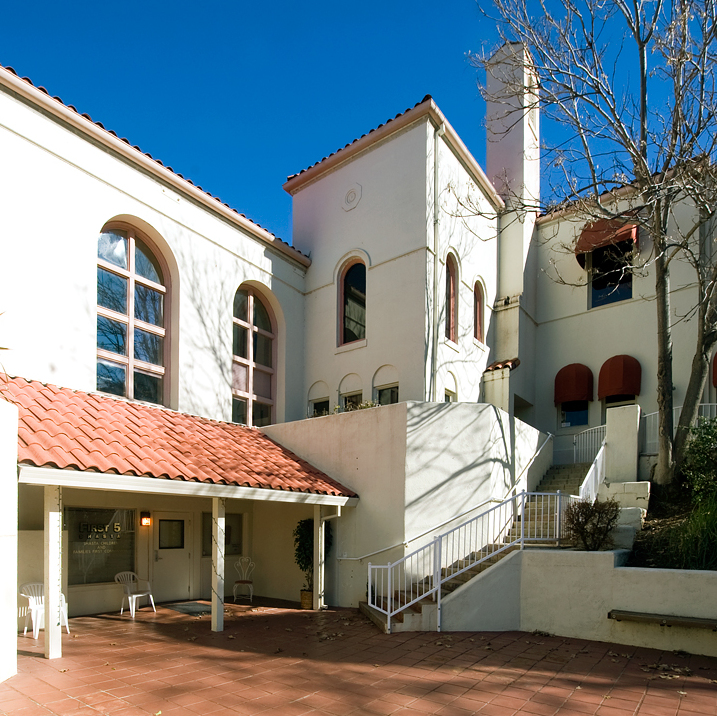
- Top: Sundial Bridge at Turtle Bay; middle: Cascade Theatre, Hotel Lorenz; bottom: Old City Hall, Pine Street School

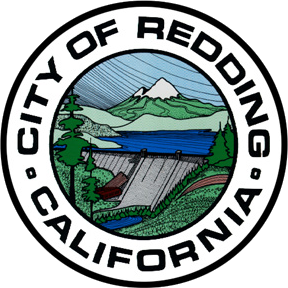
- Flag Seal
- Interactive map of Redding, California
- Location in the United States Redding (the United States)
- Coordinates: 40°35′11″N 122°23′30″W
- Country: United States
- State: California
- County: Shasta
- Incorporated: October 4, 1887
- Founder: Pierson B. Reading

Government
  - Type: Council-manager
  - Mayor: Jack Munns

Area
  - Total: 61.17 sq mi (158.44 km^{2})
  - Land: 59.65 sq mi (154.48 km^{2})
  - Water: 1.53 sq mi (3.96 km^{2}) 2.50%
- Elevation: 564 ft (172 m)

Population (2020)
  - Total: 93,611
  - Rank: 83rd in California
  - Density: 1,569.5/sq mi (605.97/km^{2})
- Demonym: Reddingite
- Time zone: UTC−08:00 (PST)
  - Summer (DST): UTC−07:00 (PDT)
- ZIP codes: 96001–96003, 96049, 96099
- Area code: 530, 837
- FIPS code: 06-59920
- GNIS feature IDs: 277582, 2411531
- Website: Official website

Redding is a city in and the county seat of Shasta County, California, United States, and the economic and cultural capital of the Shasta Cascade region of Northern California. Redding lies along the Sacramento River, 162 miles (261 km) north of Sacramento, and 120 miles (190 km) south of California's northern border with Oregon. Its population was 93,611 at the 2020 census.

== Etymology ==
During the California gold rush, the area that now comprises Redding was called Poverty Flats. In 1868 the first land agent for the Central Pacific Railroad, a former Sacramento politician named Benjamin Bernard Redding, bought property in Poverty Flats on behalf of the railroad so that it could build a northern terminus there. In the process of building the terminus, the railroad also built a town in the same area, which they named Redding in honor of Benjamin Redding.

In 1874, there was a dispute over the name by local legislators and it was changed for a time to Reading, in order to honor Pierson B. Reading, who arrived in the area in 1843, owned the Buenaventura land grant on which Redding sits, and had died only a few years before, in 1868. The name was officially changed back to Redding by 1880.

== History ==
=== Indigenous culture ===
The area is inhabited by a tribe of Native Americans called the Wintu. At their height, the Wintu had as many as 239 villages in the Shasta County area.

=== Spanish and Mexican eras ===
Although Europeans had been to California as early as 1542, when Juan Cabrillo sailed to what is now San Diego Bay, indigenous natives long remained the only inhabitants of the Northern California region.

The first European settlement in the area was established in 1844 by Pierson B. Reading, an early California pioneer who received a Rancho Buena Ventura Mexican land grant for 26,632 acres (10,778 ha) that is now covered by Redding and Cottonwood, California. At the time, it was the northernmost nonnative settlement in California.

=== Gold Rush era ===
During the Gold Rush, 49ers found gold to the north on Rock, Middle and Salt creeks, near Shasta, California, and to the south along Oregon and Olney creeks but the area that is now Redding was poor placer gold ground and called Poverty Flats. In 1868 the first land agent for the Central Pacific Railroad, a former Sacramento politician named Benjamin B. Redding, bought property in Poverty Flats on behalf of the railroad for a northern terminus, which the tracks reached in 1872. In the process of building the terminus, the railroad also built the town of Redding which was officially incorporated on October 4, 1887. In 1888, Redding won the county seat from Shasta.

=== 20th century ===
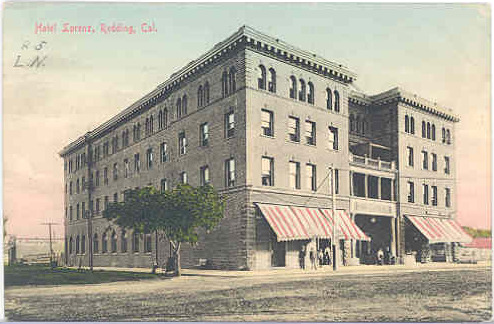
Hotel Lorenz in the early 20th century

In the early twentieth century the town's economic growth was spurred by the significant copper and iron mineral extraction industry nearby. The mining industry eventually declined, causing the economy and population to falter by 1920. It recovered in the thirties as the economy boomed due to the construction of Shasta Dam to the northwest. The building of the dam, which was completed in 1945, caused Redding's population to nearly double, also spurring the growth and development of other towns in the area.

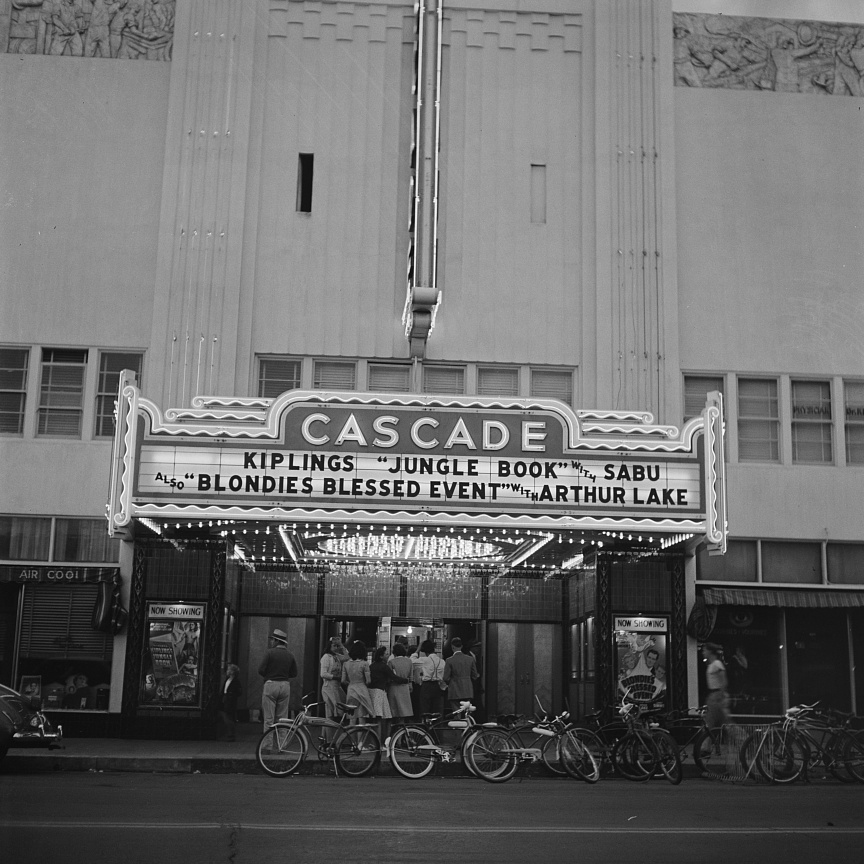
The Cascade Theatre in 1942

Redding continued to grow steadily in the 1950s due to the region's growing lumber industry and tourism brought about by the newly completed dam. The constructions of Whiskeytown and Keswick dams also helped boost the economy by bringing new workers to the area. Interstate 5 was built during the sixties and seventies, which added to development and tourism in the region.

Growth in Redding during the 1960s and 1970s was further spurred by the annexation of an area east of the Sacramento River that included the unincorporated community of Enterprise; the residents voted to support the annexation primarily to acquire less expensive electricity via Redding's municipal utility, which receives power from the dam.

During the 1970s, the lumber industry suffered from decline. In the early 1990s Lumber mills in the area closed down due to the preservation of the living habitat of the Spotted Owl. This heavily impacted the Redding area. The economy picked up, due to a retail and housing boom in the late 1980s that continued until the mid-1990s.

Also in the 1970s, the Market Street Redevelopment Project, established in 1968, began the development of the Midtown Mall. The mall was established to prevent further property deterioration and to restore and maintain the economic health of the downtown area's commercial and retail activity. The mall suffered multiple difficulties. The passage of Proposition 13 in 1978 reduced the mall's property valuation and consequently, the city had to continuously loan money to keep the bonds for the mall's parking structure from going into default; the bonds completely repaid in 2003 and Midtown began to pay off its more than $1.5 million debt to the City of Redding. By the 1980s, the properties around the mall and along the old State Highway 99/273 corridor continued to suffer urban blight, including deteriorating and dilapidated utilities and structures and inappropriate mixed land uses; this required further public intervention in the form of another Market Street Redevelopment Project with significant changes to Midtown in 1990 to include a mix of residential and commercial land around the original project.

=== 21st century ===
Following redevelopment of Midtown, property values within the Market Street Redevelopment Project area improved; further redevelopment continued. A plan for the downtown area adopted in January 2001 led to the renovation of the historic Cascade Theatre, the removal of the Midtown Mall roof creating an open air pedestrian street, the installation of a visitor way-finding system, the completion of a Health Sciences and University Center with partnership with Shasta College, and the renovation of various buildings along California Street with the help of a private developer.

In 2017, the city adopted a new flag after holding a redesign contest.

The 21st century has also seen a number of devastating wildfires near and in Redding. In 1999, the Jones Fire destroyed over 100 structures, followed by the Bear Fire in 2004. In late July 2018, the Carr Fire in Shasta County seriously impacted the Redding area with the destruction of at least 1,100 buildings, with several thousand more threatened, 38,000 people instructed to evacuate and 8 deaths. Most recently, the Fawn Fire in 2021 also resulted in the evacuation of over 4,000 people and the destruction of 185 buildings.

== Geography ==
According to the United States Census Bureau, the city has a total area of 61.2 square miles (159 square kilometers), of which 59.6 square miles (154 km^{2}) is land and 1.5 square miles (3.9 km^{2}) (2.50%) is beneath water.

Redding is located at the very northwestern end of the Central Valley, which transitions into the Cascade foothills. The city is surrounded by mountains to the north, east, and west and fertile farm land to the south. Outermost parts of the city are part of the Cascade foothills, whereas southern and central areas are in the Sacramento Valley.

The elevation in Redding is 495 feet (151 meters) on average, whereas anywhere to the north, east, or west of downtown ranges between 550 and 800 feet (170 and 240 m). Southern portions range between 400 and 500 feet (120 and 150 m).

The Shasta Dam on the Sacramento River provides a considerable level of flood protection for Redding. The dam is capable of controlling flows up to 79,000 cubic feet (7,300 cubic meters) per second. The flow rate exceeded this threshold in both 1970 and 1974.

Soils in and around town are composed mostly of clay or gravelly loam texture, with red or brown mineral horizons. They are slightly or moderately acidic in their natural state.

There are several rare and endangered species in Redding and its immediate vicinity. The Redding Redevelopment Plan EIR notes the California State listed endangered species, slender Orcutt grass (Orcuttia tenuis), occurs in eastern Redding near the municipal airport, where vernal pools are known to exist. This endemic grass is a Federal Candidate for listing and is endangered throughout its range, confined to several populations, and seriously threatened by agriculture, overgrazing, and residential development. Vernal pools provide the preferred habitat for this plant, which the California Native Plant Society considers a rare and endangered species. These same vernal pools also support federally protected species such as the federally threatened vernal pool fairy shrimp (Branchinecta lynchi).

=== Climate ===
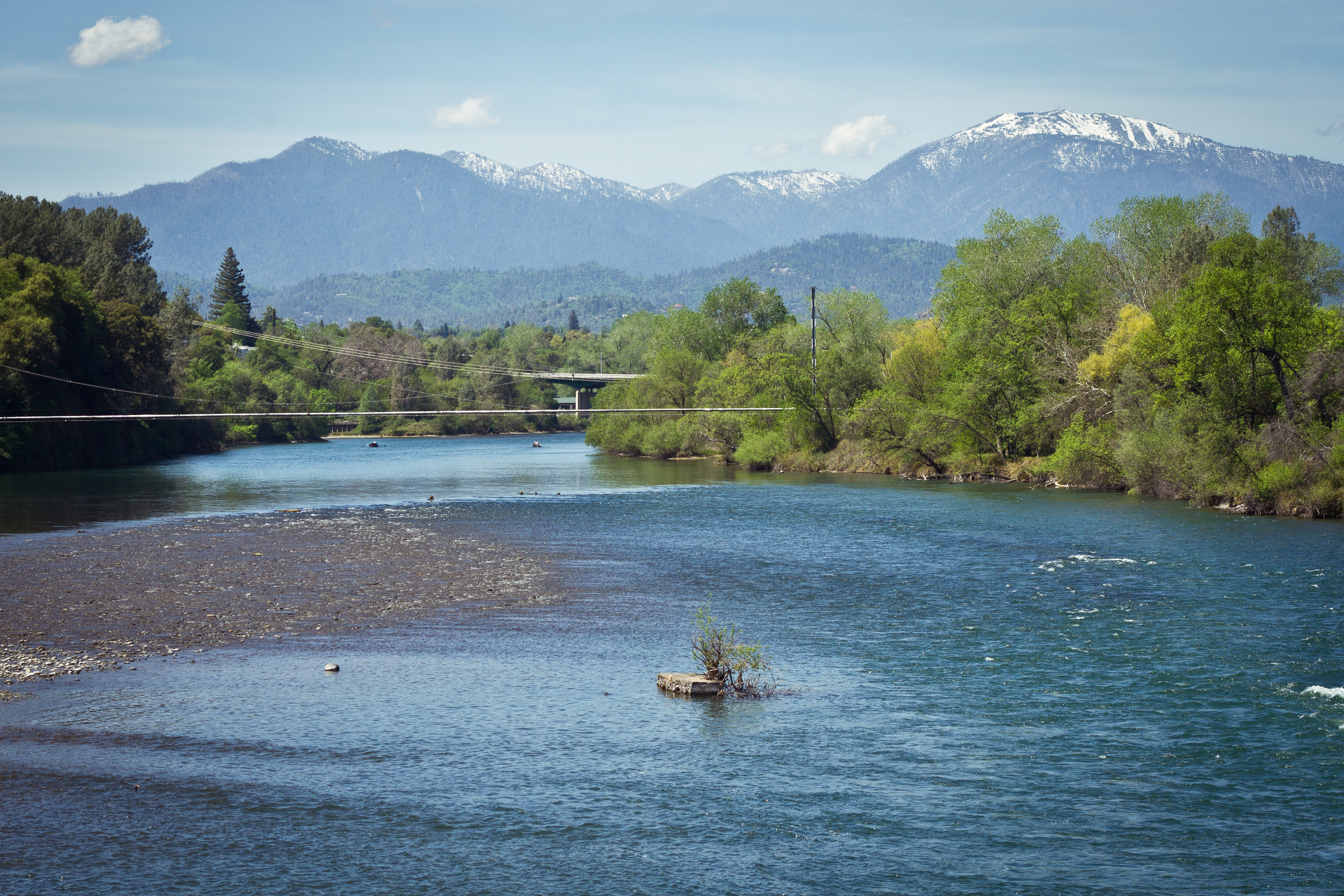
The Sacramento River passes through Redding.

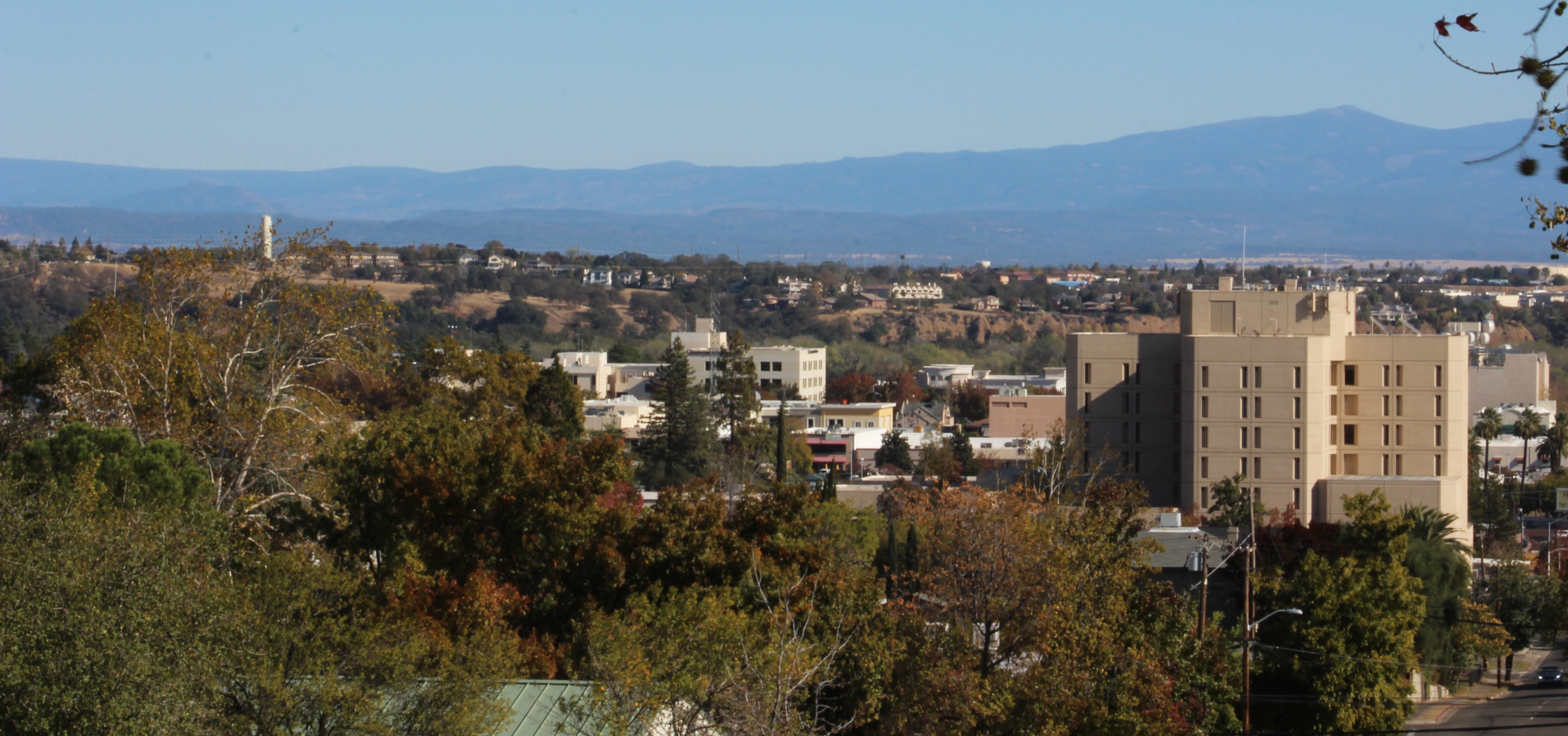
View of Redding

Redding has a hot-summer Mediterranean climate (Köppen: Csa), with very hot, dry summers and cool, wet winters. Redding is known for very high summer temperatures, despite being located north of the 40th parallel north. The somewhat strange juxtaposition of its northern position within the United States and non-desert climate, with the extreme summer heat, has long been noted by visitors and residents. July average temperatures in Redding are similar to those in Marrakesh, Morocco, which lies at a similar elevation some 9 degrees closer to the equator, and on the periphery of the Sahara Desert. The exceptional temperatures found in the city are often cited in national news sources.

Winter (October–April) provides the most precipitation of any season in Redding—the weather tends to be either rainy or foggy and at times, snow occurs. While summers are mostly hot and dry, thunderstorms are not uncommon. The average daily maximum temperature in July stays near 100 °F (37.8 °C). The highest official recorded temperature in Redding is 119 °F (48 °C) on July 6, 2024. Redding has an average possible sunshine of 88%, the second-highest percentage (after Yuma, Arizona) of any US city, though this is considered dubious by some local climatologists.

Summer overnight lows are unusually warm by Sacramento Valley standards and on average warmer than coastal towns' daytime highs. The warmest night annually averages 79 °F (26 °C). Since the station opened in 1986, the hottest night was 86 °F (30 °C) in June 2004. Redding's warm summer days and nights compared to areas further south are a result of a greater distance to maritime influences than the lower end of the valley.

Redding occasionally receives snow, though it has received as much as 23 inches (58 centimeters) of snow in a single storm, occurring on December 4–7, 1909 and December 22–24, 1968, including 16 in (41 cm) on December 23, 1968, the most in any calendar day on record. It rarely gets sleet or freezing rain. Frost occurs commonly in December through February, less often in March or November. In spring, rain is common. The city is located near the foothills of the Cascade and Klamath mountain ranges and it therefore gets much more rain than most places in the Sacramento Valley. The Northern part of the city can get up to a few more inches of rain a year due to its closer location to the mountains; temperature differentials between land and sea cause moist air from the latter to flow over the southern Sacramento valley during the summer months, producing intense heat in Redding. The direction of these winds switches from the north and east in the summer, as hot, high-pressure air flows from land to sea, making the area very dry. Tornadoes are extremely rare; flooding occurs only around the area near the Sacramento River. The coldest temperature recorded in Redding was 16 °F (−9 °C) on January 17, 2012, and December 9, 2009. The average coldest daytime high of the year is 41 °F (5 °C) and the lowest on record is 29 °F (−2 °C) in 1990, which remains the latest year to record an ice day.

Climate data for Redding Regional Airport, California (1991–2020 normals, (Note: Mean monthly maxima and minima (i.e. the expected highest and lowest temperature readings at any point during the year or given month) calculated based on data at said location from 1991 to 2020.) extremes 1893–present (Note: Records for Redding observed at: Redding Weather Service Office, January 1893–April 1929; Benton Field, May 1929–July 1944; Two differing fire stations, August 1944–August 1986; Redding Regional Airport since September 1986))
Month	Jan	Feb	Mar	Apr	May	Jun	Jul	Aug	Sep	Oct	Nov	Dec	Year
Record high °F (°C)	87 (31)	87 (31)	93 (34)	98 (37)	109 (43)	117 (47)	119 (48)	118 (48)	116 (47)	106 (41)	99 (37)	83 (28)	119 (48)
Mean maximum °F (°C)	70.5 (21.4)	74.3 (23.5)	80.7 (27.1)	88.0 (31.1)	97.4 (36.3)	106.5 (41.4)	110.5 (43.6)	108.2 (42.3)	104.9 (40.5)	94.9 (34.9)	79.8 (26.6)	68.9 (20.5)	112.0 (44.4)
Mean daily maximum °F (°C)	57.2 (14.0)	61.0 (16.1)	65.7 (18.7)	71.8 (22.1)	82.0 (27.8)	91.9 (33.3)	99.9 (37.7)	98.1 (36.7)	92.3 (33.5)	79.4 (26.3)	64.4 (18.0)	56.0 (13.3)	76.6 (24.8)
Daily mean °F (°C)	47.5 (8.6)	50.5 (10.3)	54.4 (12.4)	59.4 (15.2)	68.2 (20.1)	77.1 (25.1)	83.4 (28.6)	81.0 (27.2)	75.3 (24.1)	64.8 (18.2)	52.9 (11.6)	46.6 (8.1)	63.4 (17.4)
Mean daily minimum °F (°C)	37.7 (3.2)	40.1 (4.5)	43.2 (6.2)	47.0 (8.3)	54.3 (12.4)	62.4 (16.9)	67.0 (19.4)	63.9 (17.7)	58.2 (14.6)	50.2 (10.1)	41.5 (5.3)	37.2 (2.9)	50.2 (10.1)
Mean minimum °F (°C)	27.0 (−2.8)	28.8 (−1.8)	32.0 (0.0)	34.5 (1.4)	42.6 (5.9)	51.3 (10.7)	58.0 (14.4)	56.1 (13.4)	48.9 (9.4)	39.1 (3.9)	29.7 (−1.3)	25.7 (−3.5)	23.5 (−4.7)
Record low °F (°C)	16 (−9)	20 (−7)	27 (−3)	28 (−2)	31 (−1)	38 (3)	48 (9)	44 (7)	39 (4)	29 (−2)	21 (−6)	16 (−9)	16 (−9)
Average precipitation inches (mm)	6.04 (153)	5.48 (139)	4.62 (117)	2.41 (61)	1.81 (46)	0.75 (19)	0.07 (1.8)	0.13 (3.3)	0.45 (11)	1.92 (49)	3.53 (90)	6.31 (160)	33.52 (851)
Average snowfall inches (cm)	1.1 (2.8)	0.8 (2.0)	0.0 (0.0)	0.0 (0.0)	0.0 (0.0)	0.0 (0.0)	0.0 (0.0)	0.0 (0.0)	0.0 (0.0)	0.0 (0.0)	0.0 (0.0)	0.7 (1.8)	2.6 (6.6)
Average precipitation days (≥ 0.01 in)	12.2	10.9	11.7	8.1	6.1	2.9	0.5	0.6	1.4	4.7	8.8	12.6	80.6
Average snowy days (≥ 0.1 in)	0.4	0.3	0.0	0.0	0.0	0.0	0.0	0.0	0.0	0.0	0.0	0.1	0.8
Source 1: NOAA
Source 2: WRCC

== Demographics ==
Historical population
Census	Pop.	Note	%±
1880	600		—
1890	1,821		203.5%
1900	2,946		61.8%
1910	3,572		21.2%
1920	2,962		−17.1%
1930	4,188		41.4%
1940	8,109		93.6%
1950	10,256		26.5%
1960	12,773		24.5%
1970	16,659		30.4%
1980	42,103		152.7%
1990	66,462		57.9%
2000	80,865		21.7%
2010	89,861		11.1%
2020	93,611		4.2%
U.S. Decennial Census

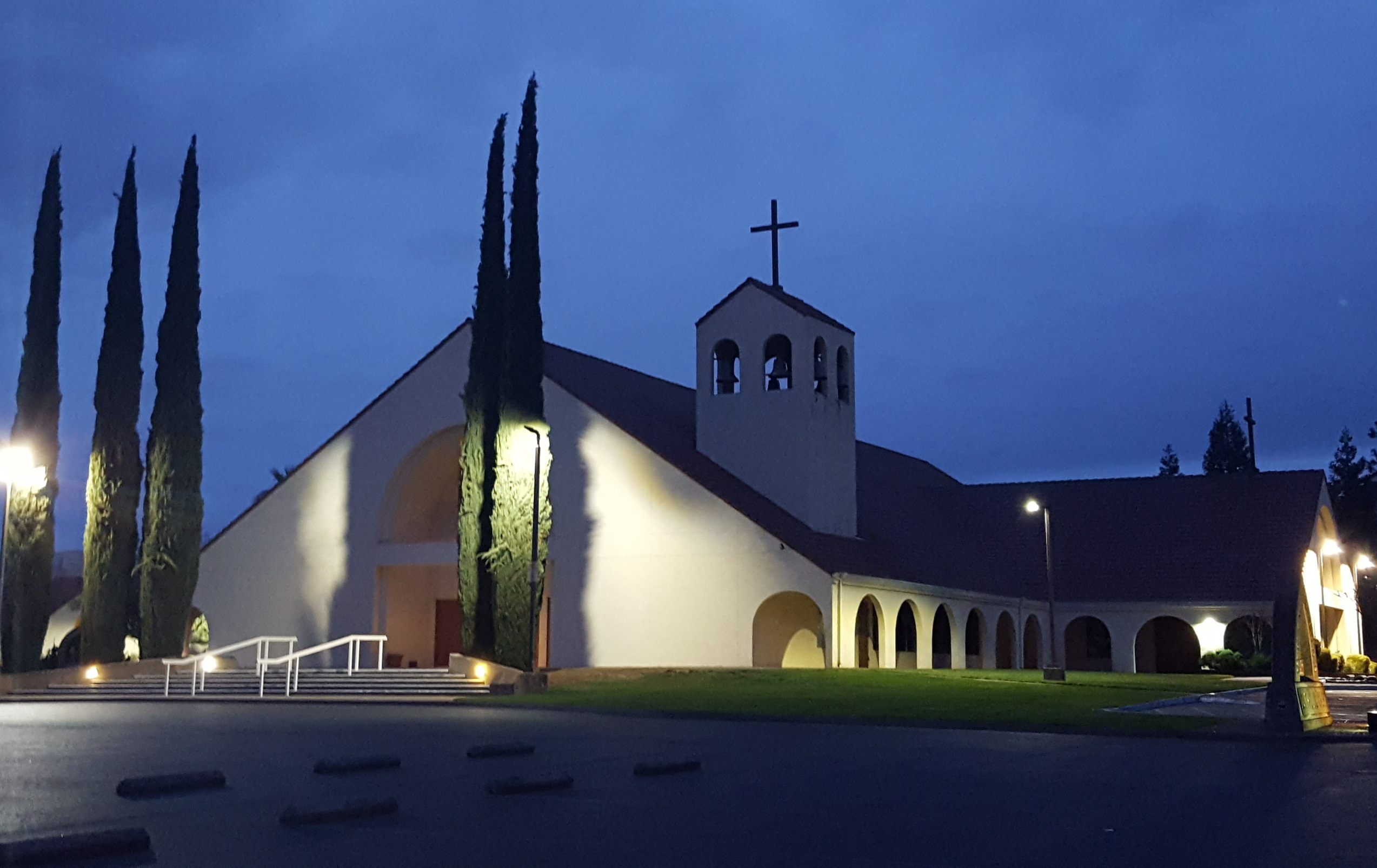
Our Lady of Mercy Catholic Church

=== Racial and ethnic composition ===
Redding, California – Racial and ethnic composition Note: the US Census treats Hispanic/Latino as an ethnic category. This table excludes Latinos from the racial categories and assigns them to a separate category. Hispanics/Latinos may be of any race.
Race / Ethnicity (NH = Non-Hispanic)	Pop 2000	Pop 2010	Pop 2020	% 2000	% 2010	% 2020
White alone (NH)	69,293	73,038	68,751	85.69%	81.28%	73.44%
Black or African American alone (NH)	828	1,025	1,299	1.02%	1.14%	1.39%
Native American or Alaska Native alone (NH)	1,625	1,665	1,747	2.01%	1.85%	1.87%
Asian alone (NH)	2,372	2,974	4,086	2.93%	3.31%	4.36%
Pacific Islander alone (NH)	79	128	180	0.10%	0.14%	0.19%
Other race alone (NH)	142	123	518	0.18%	0.14%	0.55%
Mixed race or Multiracial (NH)	2,133	3,121	6,540	2.64%	3.47%	6.99%
Hispanic or Latino (any race)	4,393	7,787	10,490	5.43%	8.67%	11.21%
Total	80,865	89,861	93,611	100.00%	100.00%	100.00%

=== 2020 census ===
As of the 2020 census, Redding had a population of 93,611, with 37,761 households and 23,231 families.

The population density was 1,569.4 per square mile (606.0/km^{2}). There were 40,083 housing units at an average density of 672.0 per square mile (259.5/km^{2}). Of all housing units, 5.8% were vacant; the homeowner vacancy rate was 1.6% and the rental vacancy rate was 5.3%.

The median age was 39.8 years. Age distribution was 21.6% under 18, 8.4% from 18 to 24, 25.7% from 25 to 44, 23.1% from 45 to 64, and 21.1% age 65 or older. For every 100 females there were 93.4 males, and for every 100 females age 18 and over there were 90.4 males.

Of the 37,761 households, 27.8% had children under the age of 18 living in them. Of all households, 42.1% were married-couple households, 19.3% were households with a male householder and no spouse or partner present, and 30.7% were households with a female householder and no spouse or partner present. About 29.8% of households were made up of individuals, and 14.8% had someone living alone who was 65 years of age or older. The average household size was 2.5 and the average family size was 3.0.

97.8% of residents lived in urban areas, while 2.2% lived in rural areas.

=== 2016–2020 American Community Survey estimates ===
The 2016–2020 5-year American Community Survey estimates show that the median household income was $56,098 (with a margin of error of +/- $2,238). The median family income was $68,340 (+/- $3,919). Males had a median income of $37,945 (+/- $3,187) versus $27,470 (+/- $2,240) for females. The median income for those above 16 years old was $32,199 (+/- $1,165). Approximately, 10.3% of families and 16.5% of the population were below the poverty line, including 19.8% of those under the age of 18 and 8.8% of those ages 65 or over.

The percent of those with a bachelor’s degree or higher was estimated to be 17.7% of the population.

=== 2010 census ===
The 2010 United States census reported that Redding had a population of 89,861. The population density was 1,468.9 inhabitants per square mile (567.1/km^{2}). The racial makeup of Redding was 77,117 (85.8%) White, 1,092 (1.2%) African American, 2,034 (2.3%) Native American, 3,034 (3.4%) Asian, 156 (0.2%) Pacific Islander, 2,307 (2.6%) from other races, and 4,121 (4.6%) from two or more races. There were 7,787 people of Hispanic or Latino origin, of any race (8.7%).

The Census reported that 87,841 people (97.8% of the population) lived in households, 1,138 (1.3%) lived in non-institutionalized group quarters, and 882 (1.0%) were institutionalized.

There were 36,130 households, out of which 11,012 (30.5%) had children under the age of 18 living in them, 16,001 (44.3%) were married couples living together, 4,806 (13.3%) had a female householder with no husband present, 1,984 (5.5%) had a male householder with no wife present. There were 2,570 (7.1%) unmarried opposite-sex partnerships, and 204 (0.6%) same-sex married couples or partnerships. 10,344 households (28.6%) were made up of individuals, and 4,622 (12.8%) had someone living alone who was 65 years of age or older. The average household size was 2.43. There were 22,791 families (63.1% of all households); the average family size was 2.94.

The population was spread out, with 20,518 people (22.8%) under the age of 18, 9,436 people (10.5%) aged 18 to 24, 21,725 people (24.2%) aged 25 to 44, 23,424 people (26.1%) aged 45 to 64, and 14,758 people (16.4%) who were 65 years of age or older. The median age was 38.5 years. For every 100 females, there were 93.8 males. For every 100 females age 18 and over, there were 90.4 males.

There were 38,679 housing units at an average density of 632.3 units per square mile (244.1 units/km^{2}), of which 19,968 (55.3%) were owner-occupied, and 16,162 (44.7%) were occupied by renters. The homeowner vacancy rate was 2.3%; the rental vacancy rate was 6.9%. 48,179 people (53.6% of the population) lived in owner-occupied housing units and 39,662 people (44.1%) lived in rental housing units.

== Economy ==
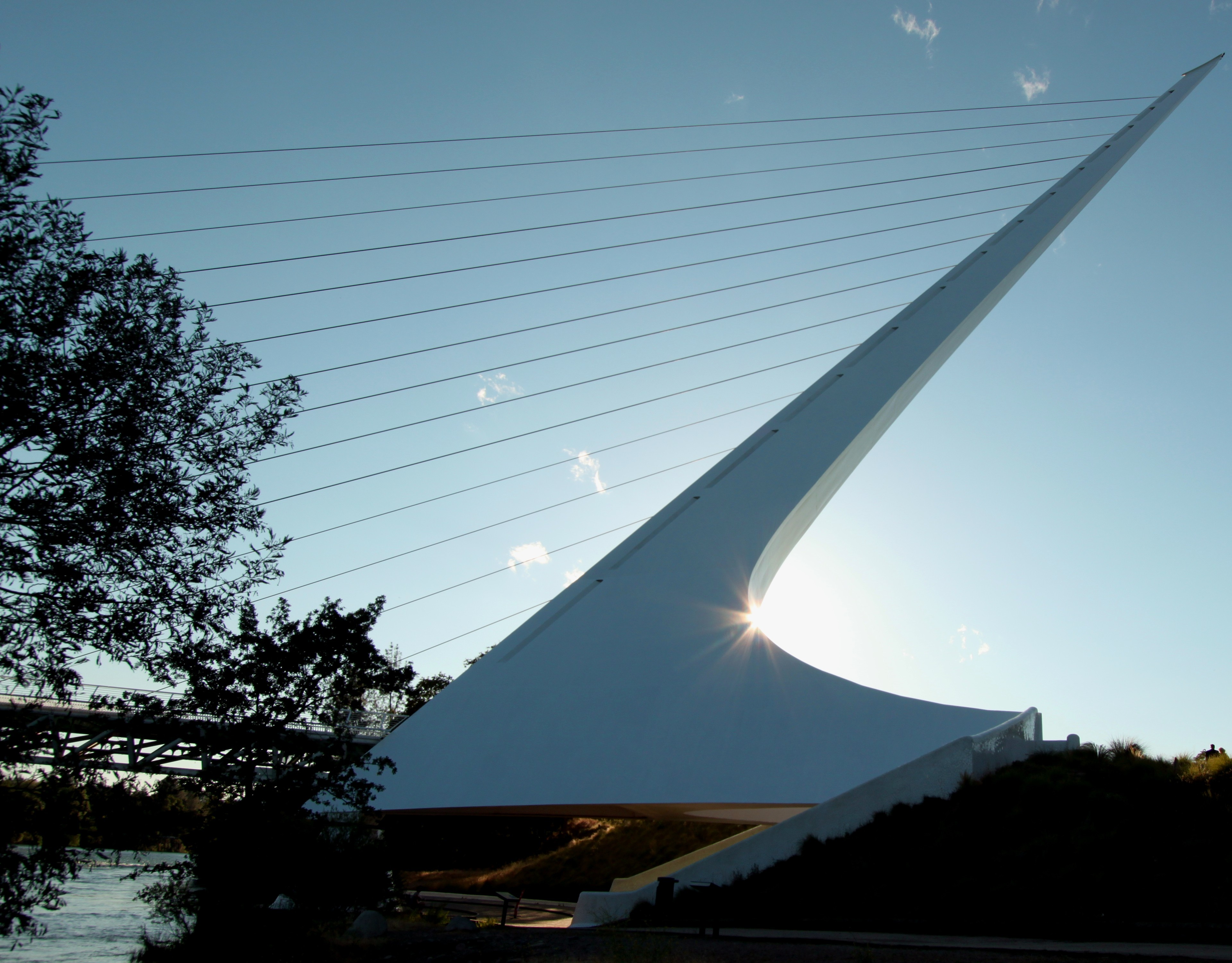
The Sundial Bridge at Turtle Bay is the world's largest sundial.

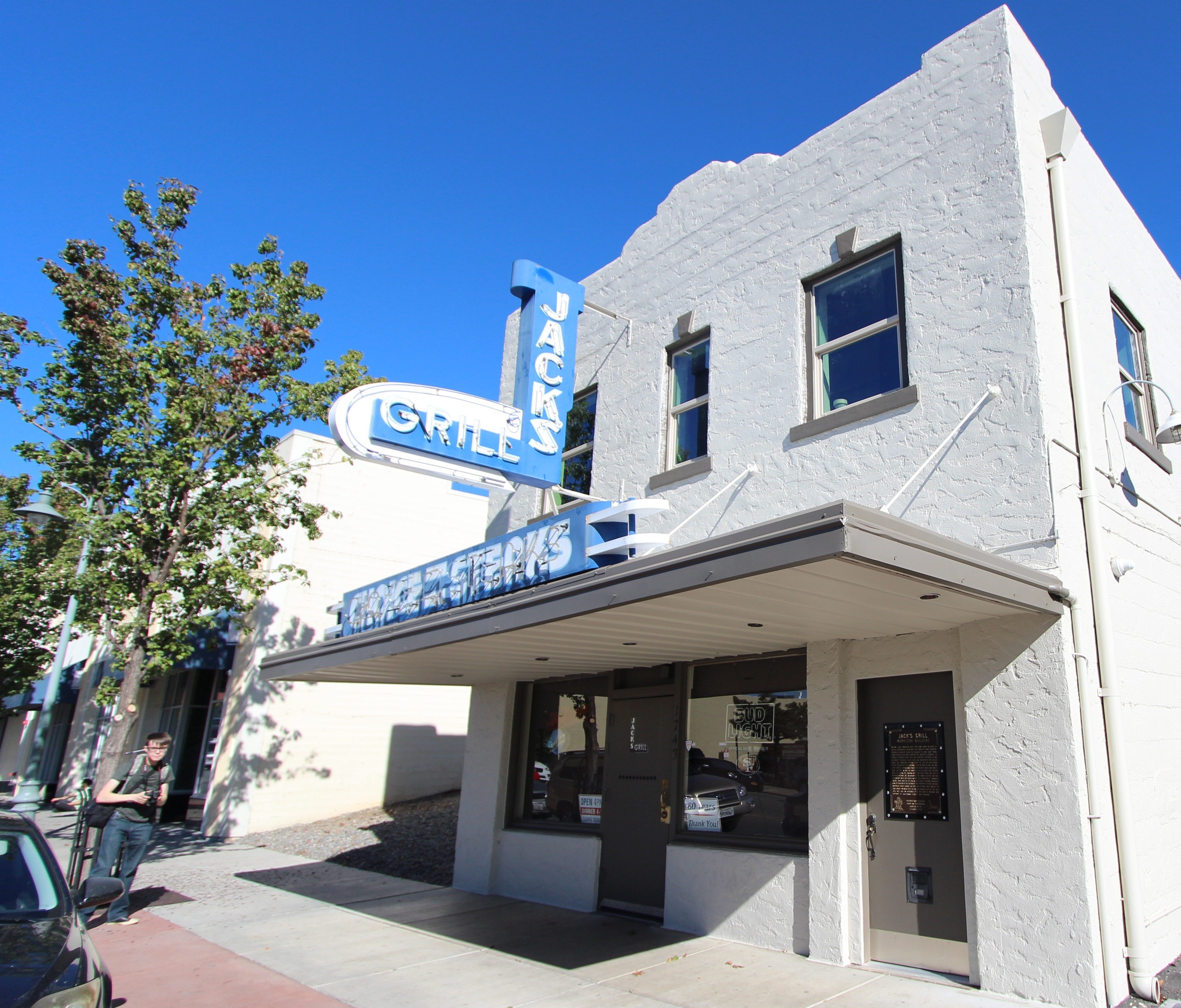
The historic Jack's Grill

Redding is the economic hub of the Shasta Cascade region of Northern California.

The Redding Metropolitan Statistical Area (MSA) was recognized as the 29th Most Dynamic MSA in the United States in 2019 by the Walton Family Foundation. Redding was recognized for having a diversified economy with several large employers in different sectors.

The Redding Cultural District is one of 14 Arts and Culture Districts recognized by the State of California Arts Council. The district includes Downtown Redding; the adjacent Turtle Bay Complex; and City of Redding Parks across the Sacramento River from Downtown and Turtle Bay.

=== Top employers ===
According to the city's 2016 Comprehensive Annual Financial Report, the top employers in Redding are:

#	Employer	# of employees
1	Mercy Medical Center	1,832
2	Shasta County	1,750
3	City of Redding	1,129
4	Shasta Regional Medical Center	856
5	CA Transportation Department	663
6	Redding Rancheria	523
7	Wal-Mart	450
8	Shasta Union High School District	406
9	Shasta College	352
10	Blue Shield of California	330

== Government ==
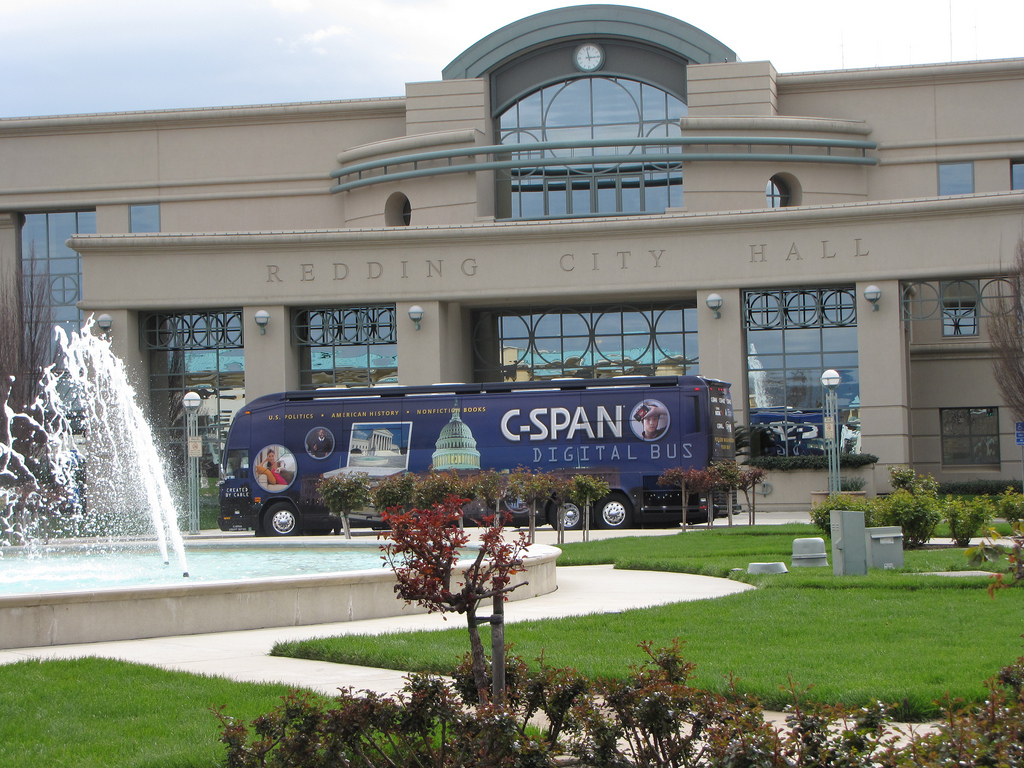
Redding City Hall.

=== State and federal representation ===
In the California State Legislature, Redding is in the 1st senatorial district, represented by Republican Megan Dahle, and the 1st Assembly district, represented by Republican Heather Hadwick.

In the United States House of Representatives, Redding is in California's 1st congressional district, represented by Republican James Gallagher.

=== Municipal government ===
The city council is composed of Mayor Jack Munns, Vice Mayor Mike Littau, Erin Resner, Tenessa Audette, and Paul Dhanuka. The city manager is Barry Tippin.

Redding is a general law city operating under the council-manager form of government.

== Parks and recreation ==
Old City Hall Arts Center.

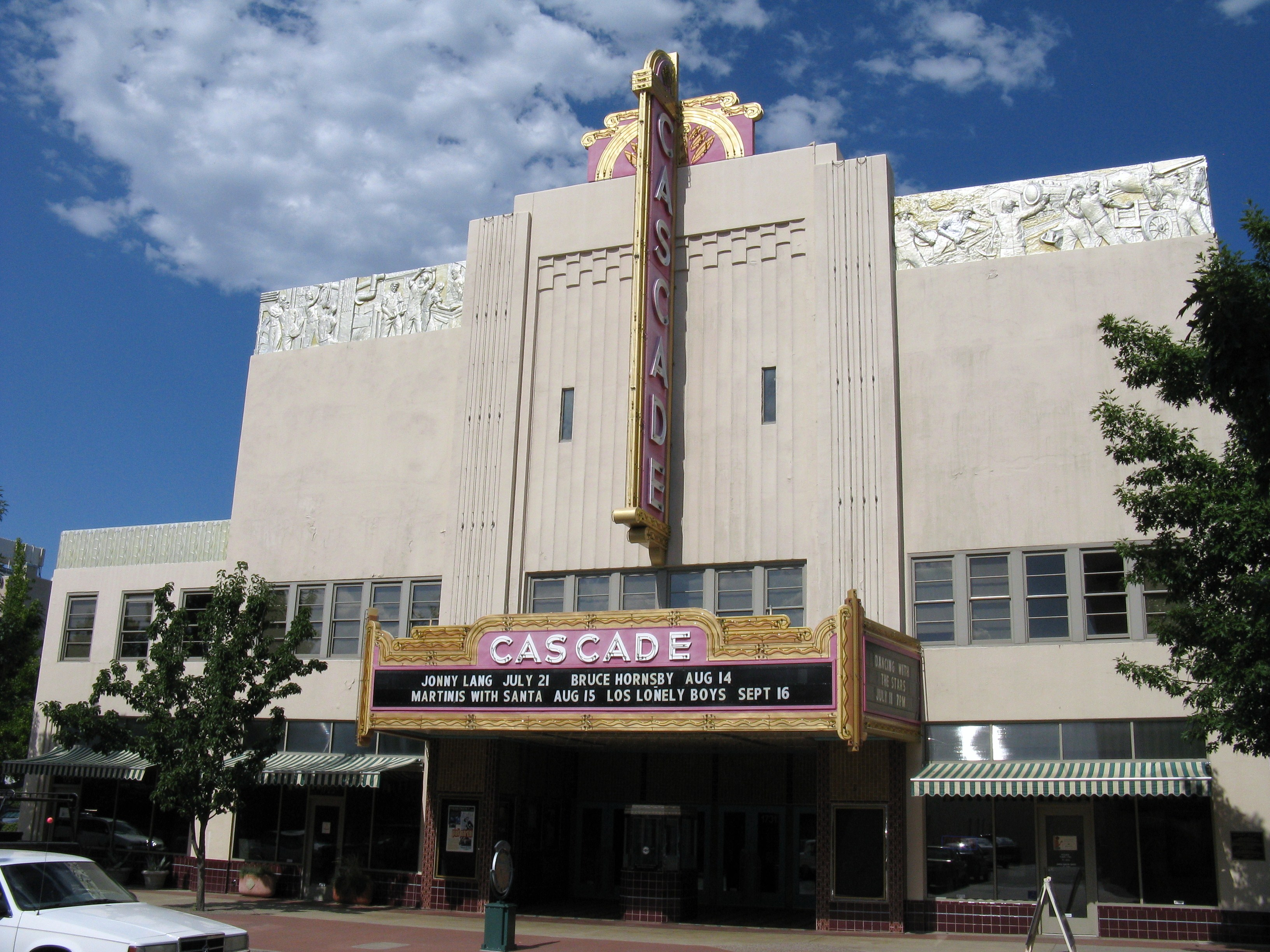
Cascade Theatre

=== Museums and public art ===
- Sculpture park at City Hall
- Sundial Bridge at Turtle Bay, by Santiago Calatrava
- Santiago Calatrava sculpture, at Domke Plaza
- Shasta Historical Society

=== Architecture ===
- Hotel Lorenz
- Pilgrim Congregational Church

=== Venues ===
- Cascade Theatre
- The Dip
- IOOF Hall
- Riverfront Amphitheater
- Old City Hall
- Redding Civic Auditorium
- Axiom Repertory Theatre

=== Performing arts ===
- Riverfront Playhouse
- Axiom Repertory Theater

== Education ==
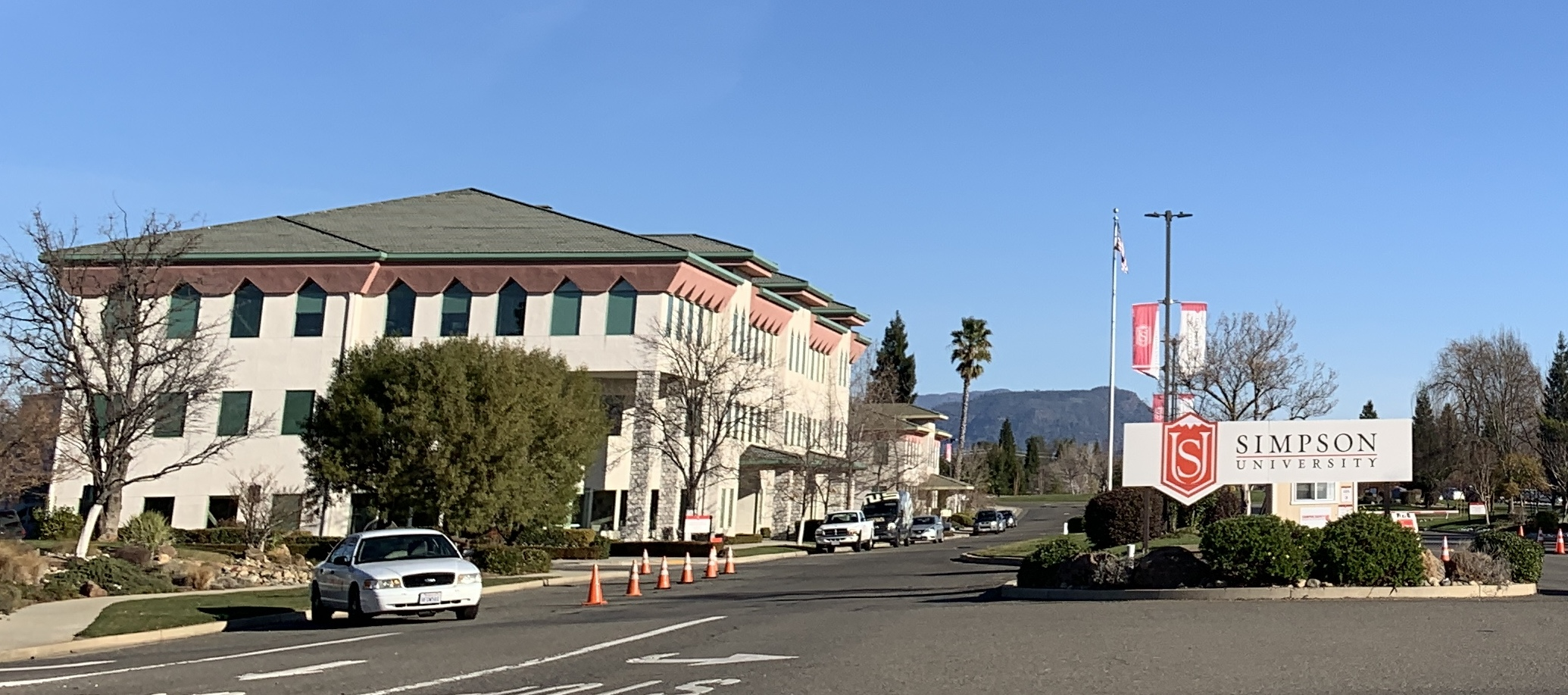
Simpson University.

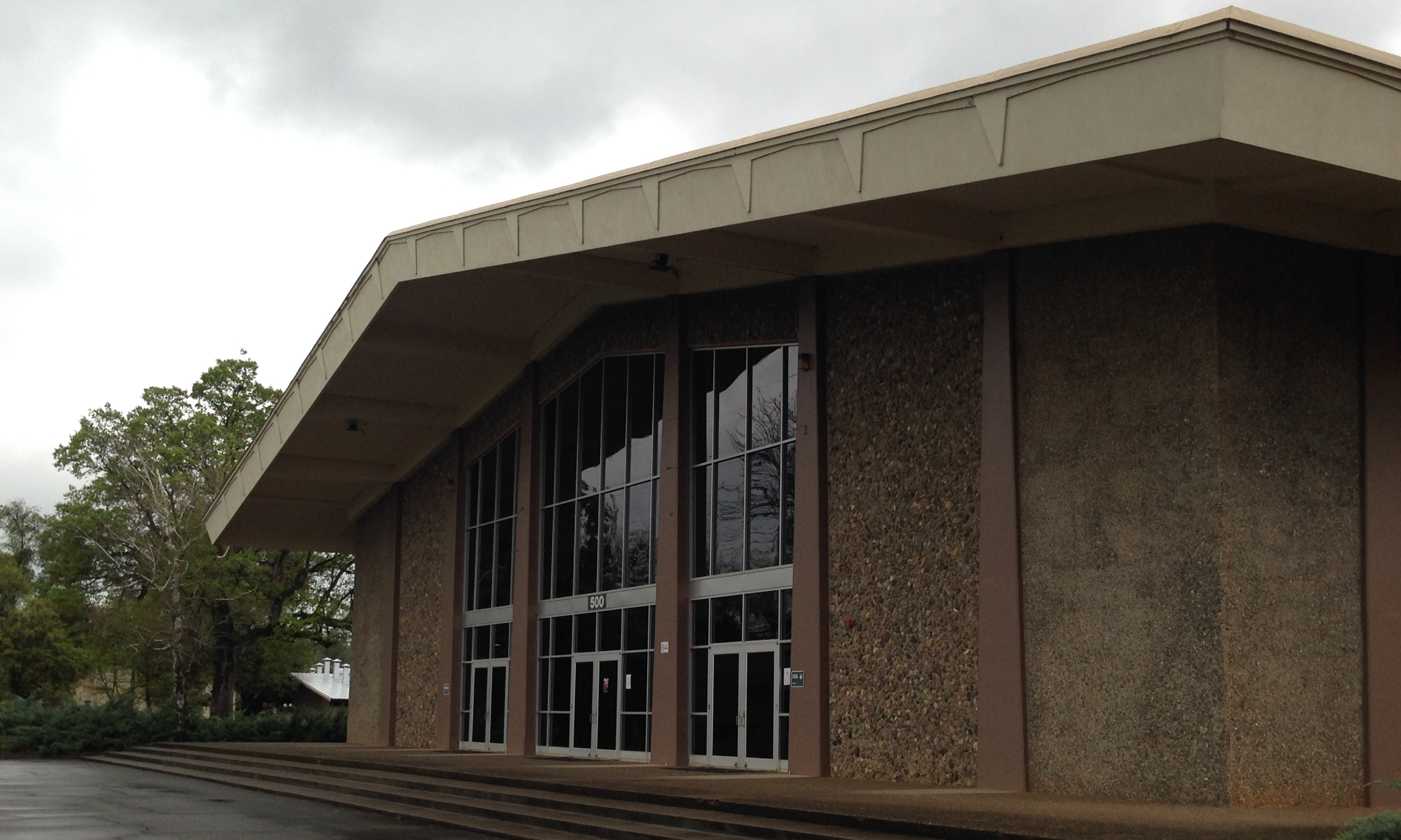
Shasta College.

=== Higher education ===
==== Public ====
- Shasta College

==== Private ====
- National University
- Shasta Bible College and Graduate School
- Simpson University

=== High schools ===
==== Public ====
- Shasta High School
- Enterprise High School
- Foothill High School
- Pioneer High School

==== Secondary ====
- University Preparatory School

=== Charter schools ===
- Stellar Charter School

=== Trade schools ===
- Redding Institute of Technology
- Shasta School of Cosmetology
- CloudWise Academy

== Media ==
=== Print ===
- Redding Record Searchlight
- After Five

=== Television ===
TV stations serving Redding include:

Full-power

- KRCR-TV:
  - Channel 7.1 (ABC)
  - Channel 7.2 (Fox)
- KIXE-TV, Channel 9 (PBS)
- KHSL-TV:
  - Channel 12.1 (CBS)
  - Channel 12.2 (The CW)
- KCVU, Channel 20 (Roar)
  - Roar
- KNVN:
  - Channel 24.1 (NBC)
  - Channel 24.2 (Telemundo)

Low-power

- KXVU-LD, Channel 17 (Antenna TV)
- KXCH-LD, Channel 19
- KRVU-LD, Channel 21 (MyNetworkTV)
- KDRC-LD, Channel 26
- KUCO-LD:
  - Channel 27.1 (Univision)
  - Channel 27.2 (Broadcast translator for KKTF-LD, UniMás)
- K33HH-D, Channel 33 (Broadcast translator for KBLN-TV)

=== Radio ===
Radio stations include:

AM stations

- 540 KVIP (Christian)
- 1230 KLXR (Christian radio)
- 1400 KNRO (Sports)
- 1460 KCNR (Conservative talk)
- 1670 KQMS (Conservative talk)

FM stations

- 88.5 KKRN (Community radio)
- 88.9 KFPR (NPR)
- 92.7 KYCT (Classic country)
- 94.7KEWB (Contemporary hit)
- 96.1 KYTO (Oldies)
- 97.3 KNCQ (Country music)
- 98.1 KVIP (Christian)
- 99.3 KWLZ (Contemporary hit)
- 100.1 KZRO (Oldies/classic hits/classic rock)
- 101.1 KWCA (Classical music)
- 103.1 KHRD (Classic rock)
- 104.3 KSHA (Adult contemporary)
- 105.3 KRDG (Classic hits)
- 106.1 KRRX (Active rock)
- 107.1 KESR (Adult hits)
- 107.9 KKLC (Contemporary Christian)

== Transportation ==
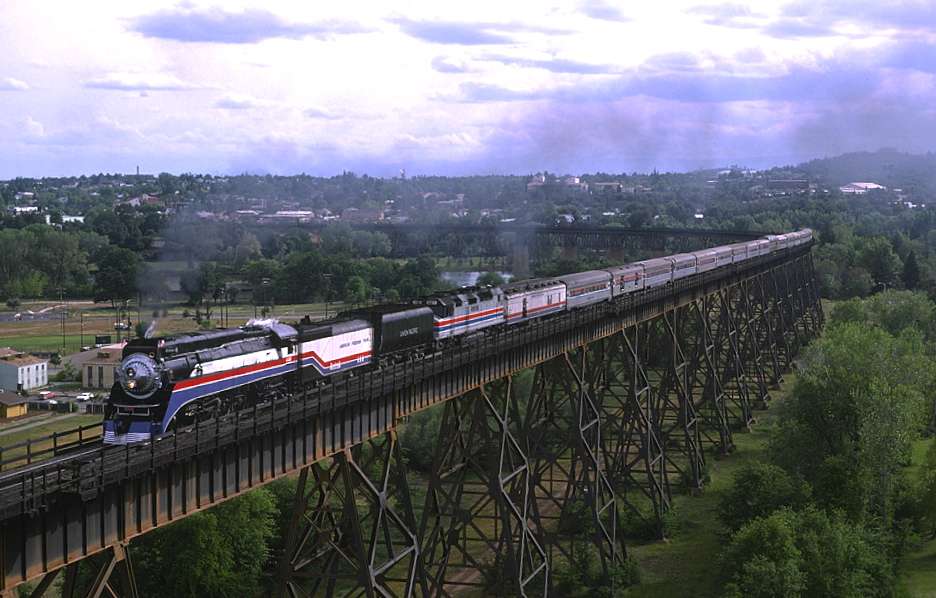
The historic Redding rail trestle.

=== Major highways ===
- Interstate 5 runs through the east central portion of Redding.
- CA 299, formerly U.S. 299, runs through the western, central, and northeastern parts of the city.
- CA 44 runs through the middle and eastern part of town. Its western terminus is at Market Street (California 273) in downtown Redding.
- CA 273, formerly the Interstate 5 Business Route and also formerly U.S. 99, runs through the city.

=== Rail and bus transportation ===
Amtrak provides service to Redding station, operating its Coast Starlight daily in both directions between Seattle, Washington, and Los Angeles, California via Portland, Oregon; Sacramento, California; Oakland, California; San Jose, California; Santa Barbara, California and all Intermediate station stops. Amtrak Thruway also provides twice daily service to Stockton or Sacramento for connections to the Gold Runner, which serve the San Francisco Bay Area, San Joaquin Valley and the Los Angeles area via bus connections.

Redding's municipal bus transportation system is called RABA (Redding Area Bus Authority). RABA serves routes throughout the City of Redding and also provides transportation to/from Redding's suburbs. Transportation is also available by RABA to Burney, by Sage Stage to Alturas and by Trinity Transit to Weaverville. Redding is also served by the intercity bus companies Greyhound and Fronteras del Norte.

Shasta Regional Transportation Agency has proposed a weekday commuter bus to/from Redding and the Sacramento Valley Station, following a route similar to the twice daily Amtrak Thruway 3.

=== Air transportation ===
Air transportation for the Redding area is available at Redding Municipal Airport and Benton Field.

== Notable people ==
This list includes notable persons who were born/raised/worked in, lived in, or whose identity was significantly influenced by Redding, as well as music groups that were founded in the area.

- David de Berry – theater composer and actor
- Eloise B. Cushing – attorney
- Shane Drake – music video director
- Ashley Parker Angel – recording artist and actor
- Francesca Eastwood – actor
- Lynsi Snyder – owner of In-N-Out
- Rich Eisen – sportscaster
- Kathleen Kennedy – film producer
- Matthew Kennedy – author
- Tommy Kirk – film actor
- Tom Meyer – professor, speaker, and author
- Kevin Rose – Internet entrepreneur
- Cory Asbury – contemporary Christian singer
- Duffy Bishop – electric blues singer and songwriter
- Brian Johnson - contemporary worship singer and songwriter
- Scott Joss – fiddle player, songwriter
- Randy Miller – drummer of The Myriad
- Craig Padilla – ambient electronic musician and film score composer
- Bryce Pinkham – actor and singer
- Jessica Pratt – singer/songwriter
- Roy Rogers – guitarist
- Bruce Turgon – musician, songwriter, producer
- Rick Bosetti – professional baseball player
- Greg Cadaret – MLB player
- Mel Hein – football player, 1938 MVP, NFL Hall of Fame inductee
- Paul Howard – former NFL player
- Eddie Machen – heavyweight boxer
- Buck Martinez – professional MLB player, manager, broadcaster
- Matt Nichols – Canadian Football League player
- Ryan O'Callaghan – NFL football player
- Frank Crowe – chief engineer and designer of the Hoover Dam.
- Jonathan Foster – singer-songwriter
- Hilary Pecis (born 1979) – artist
- Bill Plummer – MLB player, coach and manager
- Megan Rapinoe – professional soccer player, Olympic gold medalist
- Ricky Ray – football player in the Canadian Football League
- Lynne Roberts – college basketball coach
- Jason Sehorn – former NFL player
- John Strohmayer – former MLB player and high school coach
- Raymond Jacobs – US Marine, said to be in photo of first flag raised on Iwo Jima
- Brian Sandoval – 29th governor of Nevada
- Sam Butcher – artist, Precious Moments, Inc.
- Jeffery Dangl – plant immunologist
- Bill Johnson – evangelist and leader of Bethel Church
- Ruggles brothers – stagecoach robbers
- Michael Zagaris – sports and music photographer
- Terry Riley – American composer
