= KEWB =

KEWB may refer to:

- The ICAO code for the New Bedford Regional Airport in New Bedford, Massachusetts, United States
- KEWB (FM), a radio station (94.7 FM) licensed to serve Anderson, California, United States
- KKSF (AM), a radio station (910 AM) licensed to serve Oakland, California, United States, which formerly used the call sign KEWB
