= KBQB =

Coordinates: 39.807°N 121.627°W

- Chico, California; United States
- Broadcast area: Chico, California; Paradise, California; Oroville, California
- Frequency: 92.7 MHz
- Branding: 92.7 Bob FM

Programming
- Format: Adult hits
- Affiliations: Bob FM network

Ownership
- Owner: Results Radio
- Sister stations: KCEZ, KRQR, KTHU

History
- First air date: 1993 (as KLRS)
- Former call signs: KLRS (1993–2006)
- Call sign meaning: K BoB

Technical information
- Licensing authority: FCC
- Facility ID: 10813
- Class: A
- ERP: 1,500 watts
- HAAT: 196 meters (643 ft)

Links
- Public license information: Public file; LMS
- Webcast: Listen live
- Website: 927bobfm.com

KBQB (92.7 FM, "Bob FM") is a commercial radio station located in Chico, California. KBQB airs an adult hits music format.

The station signed on the air in 1993 as KLRS and branded as "Colors 92.7 FM". It played the Top 40 (CHR) music format and was one of the most popular stations in the market. The format changed to the current "92.7 Bob FM" format in 2006.
