= KMCA =

KMCA could refer to:

- KMCA (defunct), a defunct radio station in Redding, California, USA
- KMCA-LD, a television station (channel 10) licensed to Redding, California
- Korea Music Content Association
- Russian puppet governments in Ukraine:
  - Kharkiv military-civilian administration
  - Kherson military-civilian administration
