= Tom Meyer (Bible Memory Man) =

American public speaker (born 1976)

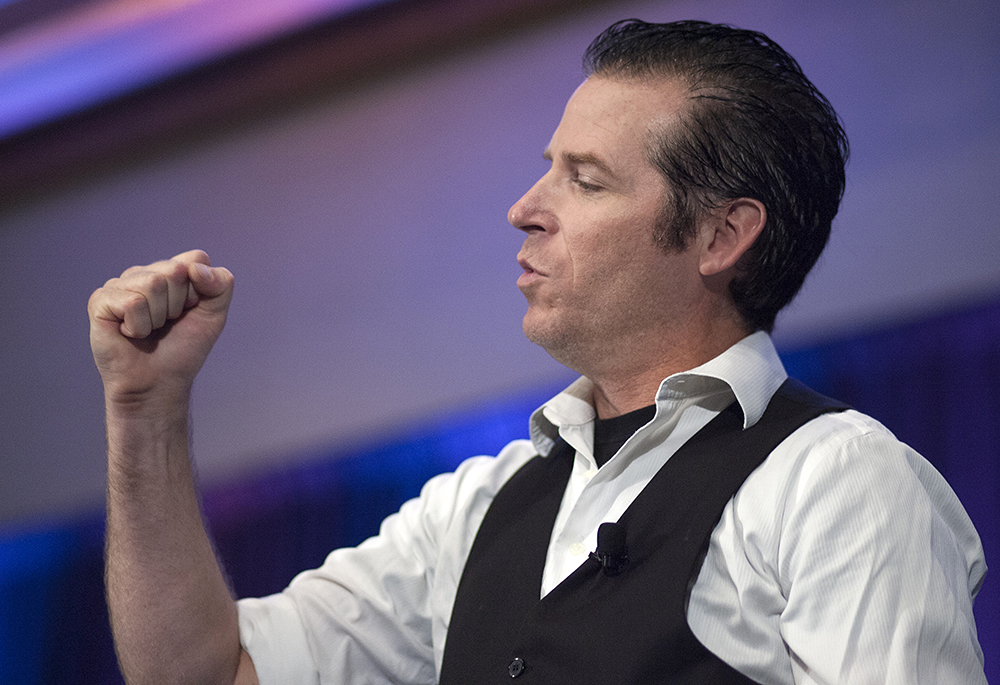
- Born: Thomas Mitchell Meyer; May 9, 1976 (age 50); Elmhurst, Illinois, U.S.
- Education: Shasta Bible College and Graduate School; Jerusalem University College
- Occupations: Professor; Author; Public speaker
- Employer: Shasta Bible College and Graduate School
- Website: thebiblememoryman.com

Tom Meyer (born May 9, 1976), known as The Bible Memory Man, is an American public speaker known for his ability to quote over 20 complete books of the Bible dramatically from memory. His book The Memorization Study Bible (2018) is published by Master Books and specifically facilitates the memorization of the Bible, a popular spiritual exercise for many Evangelical Christians.

== Family and education ==
Meyer was born in Elmhurst, IL on Mother's Day, May 9, 1976, to Tom and Deborah (Whitehead) Meyer. He is the oldest of four children. From a young age, Meyer attended Grace Baptist Church at Lombard, IL. He became a Christian at that time. At the age of 26, Meyer decided to pursue higher education. He attended Shasta Bible College and Graduate School in Redding, CA to earn his B.A. in Bible and Theology (2002–2006). At this point, Meyer determined to pursue his Biblical Studies abroad. He moved to Jerusalem, Israel for four years (2006–2010), during which he became the only person in the Institute's history to earn two master's degrees (Geography & Archaeology of Israel and Middle Eastern Culture & Religion) from Jerusalem University College in Jerusalem, Israel.

Meyer was engaged to Sarah Oakes in Bethlehem and in 2011 they got married. They have 4 children and live in Burlington, KY.

== Career and ministry ==
After graduating from Willowbrook High School in 1994, Meyer worked for his family's business, Meyer Paving in Maple Park, IL. At age 26, Meyer left IL for college in CA, and shortly thereafter began to memorize and perform portions of the Bible as a one-man, Shakespearean routine to present the most famous book in the world in a whole new way. Circa 2003, he met Jason Nightingale, the now deceased founder of Wordsower Ministries International. Intrigued by the two-fold work of stateside dramatic Bible recitations as sermons and overseas mercy ministry to orphans and widows, Meyer joined Nightingale's company and began quoting the entire book of Revelation from memory.

Meyer expanded to full-time public speaking in 2010, at which point he also began to teach at his alma mater, Shasta Bible College. In 2022, he relocated his ministry to Kentucky to volunteer at the Creation Museum and Ark Encounter. On October 11–15, 2022, Meyer and six other Christians from all walks of life quoted the entire New Testament from memory at the ICR Discovery Center in Texas. This was the first time in recorded history that such an endeavor has been accomplished.

== See also ==
- Hafiz, people who have memorized the Quran
