= Cascade Theatre =

Cinema in Redding, California, US

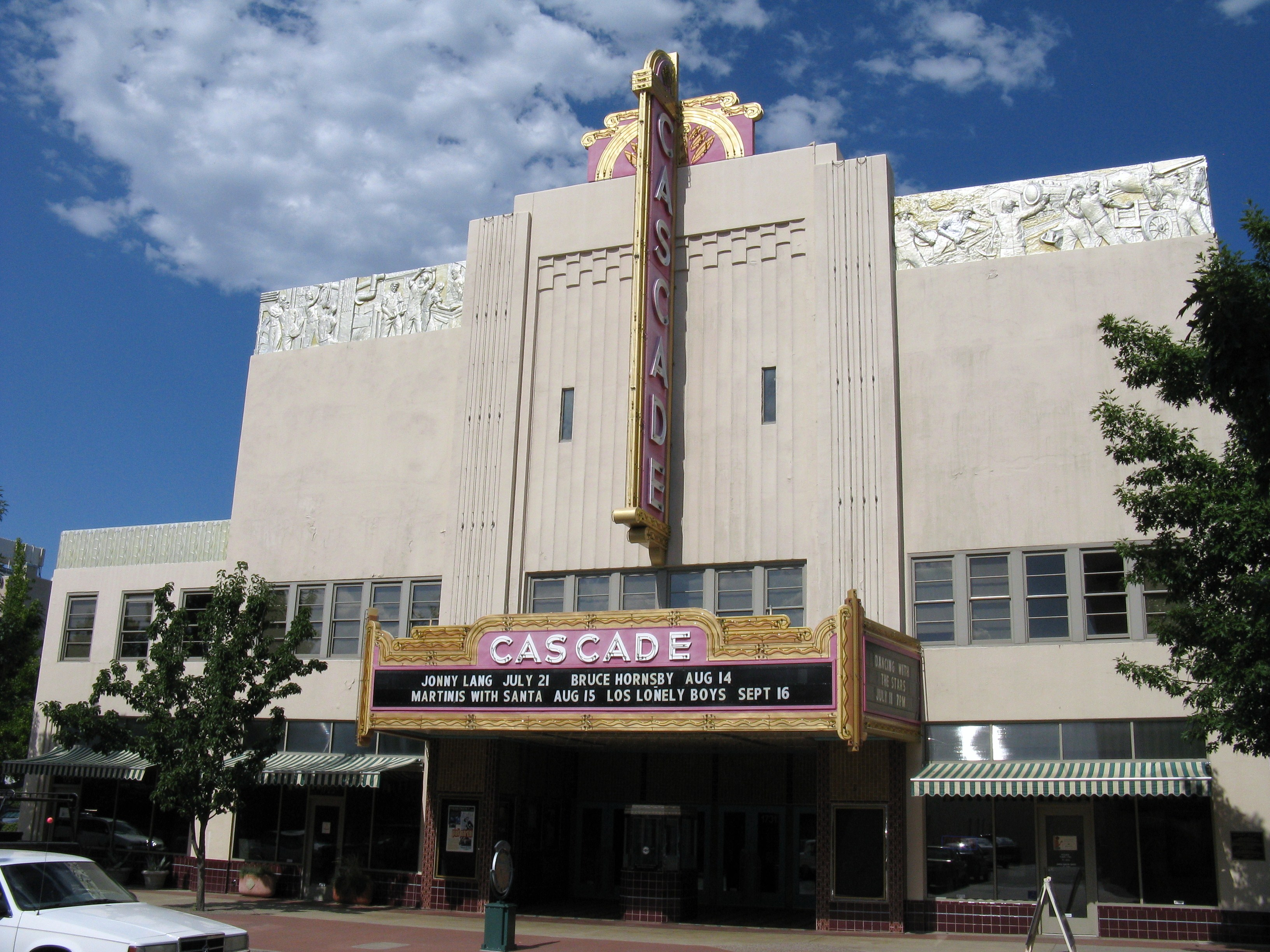
- Interactive map of Cascade Theatre
- Address: 1731 Market St. Redding, California; United States
- Owner: Southern Oregon University
- Operator: JPR Foundation
- Capacity: 1,348
- Current use: music venue

Construction
- Opened: August 9, 1935
- Reopened: 2004

Website
- www.cascadetheatre.org
- Cascade Theatre
- U.S. National Register of Historic Places
- Location within California Location within the United States
- Coordinates: 40°34′55″N 122°23′17″W
- Area: 0.3 acres (0.12 ha)
- Built by: Salih Brothers
- Architect: J. Lloyd Conrich
- Architectural style: Art Deco
- NRHP reference No.: 01001459
- Added to NRHP: January 17, 2002

The Cascade Theatre is a prominent example of the Art Deco style in Redding, California. The cinema was designed by J. Lloyd Conrich of San Francisco in 1934 for the Naify family, who operated the Golden State Theaters chain of movie theaters in northern California, which later became the United Artists Theaters. The new cinema was built in 1935 by Salih Brothers and opened on August 9 with 1348 seats. It was the first air conditioned public building in Redding. In 1979 the large house was subdivided into four smaller theaters, and in 1997 it closed. The Cascade Theatre reopened in 2004 after it was purchased by Southern Oregon University and the JPR Foundation. The house was restored to its original configuration and it is used as a community auditorium and arts center.

== Description ==
The Cascade is a masonry structure with cast-in-place concrete exterior walls. It is approximately rectangular in plan, with a plain exterior apart from its facade. The front elevation features storefront at ground level, with ribbon windows on the second floor of the main theater, which is flanked by one and two story retail space. The front is dominated by the central marquee and vertical neon sign, flanked by ribbed vertical pilasters that are ornamented with neon lighting at night. The infill between the pilasters is fluted, and capped with a cornic that supports the top of the sign, which spells out CASCADE vertically. The top of the theater building is entirely composed of a richly figured relief frieze depicting California industries, which wrap part way around to the sides, about 5 feet (1.5 m) tall.

The lobby is a rectangular space parallel to the street. The original box office has disappeared and the original vestibule has been removed. The space is richly decorated with custom light fixtures with a highly detailed sloping ceiling. The main house features more reliefs and fluted columns. Seating is arranged in an orchestra section and a balcony. The auditorium ceiling and walls feature extensive murals. A former office area on the mezzanine level has been altered to serve as a balcony lobby. Present seating capacity is 997 seated patrons and 10 wheelchairs.

The Cascade Theatre was listed on the National Register of Historic Places on January 17, 2002.

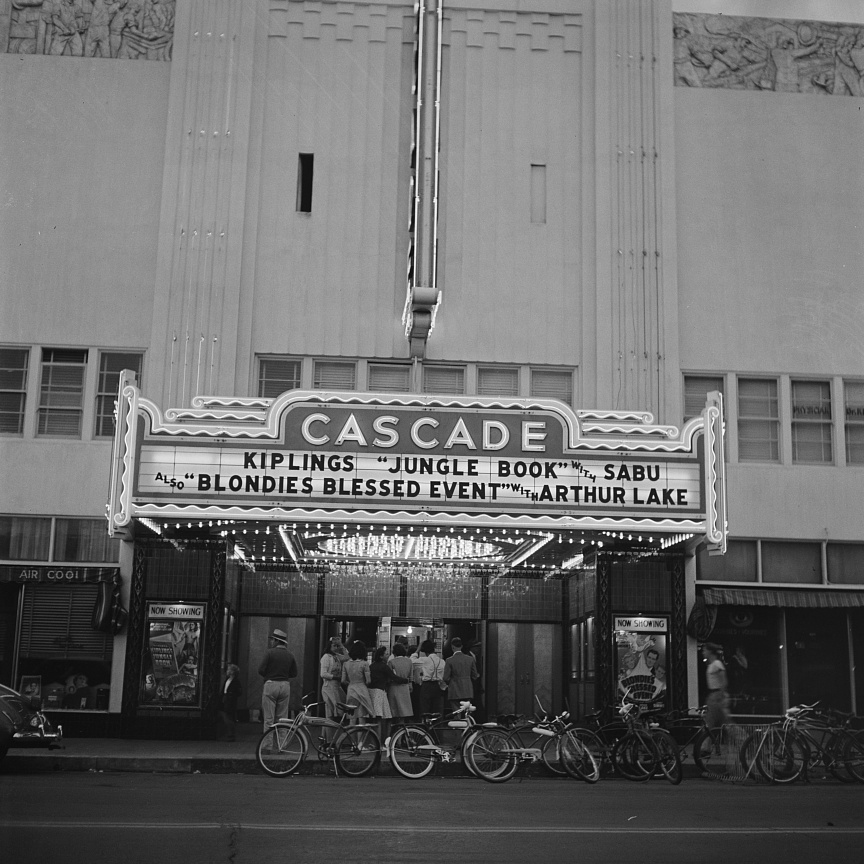
Motion picture show at the Cascade Theatre in Redding, California
