= KHRD =

Commercial radio station in Redding, California

Coordinates: 40.603°N 122.651°W

- Redding, California; United States
- Broadcast area: Redding / Red Bluff / Corning
- Frequency: 103.1 MHz
- Branding: Red 103.1

Programming
- Format: Classic rock
- Affiliations: Westwood One

Ownership
- Owner: Results Radio of Redding Licensee, LLC
- Sister stations: KESR, KEWB, KNCQ, KYTO

History
- First air date: 1999 (as KAWX)
- Former call signs: KAWX (1997–2001)
- Call sign meaning: K H ReD

Technical information
- Licensing authority: FCC
- Facility ID: 82720
- Class: C2
- ERP: 4,200 watts
- HAAT: 468 meters
- Translator: 93.3 K227AE (Redding)

Links
- Public license information: Public file; LMS
- Webcast: Listen live
- Website: red1031.com

KHRD (103.1 FM, "Red 103.1") is a commercial radio station in Redding, California, broadcasting to the Redding, California and Red Bluff, California areas.

KHRD airs a classic rock music format. KHRD listeners are known as 'Red Heads'.

== History ==
KHRD has aired numerous music formats, making attempts at both country music and heavy metal music through the years.

The country station was called B-103.1 and 93.3, and its call letters were KAWX.

In 2006, KHRD went to an "all" classic rock format and ratings and revenue have increased since the format switch.

== Translators ==
KHRD broadcasts on the following translator:

| Call sign | Frequency | City of license | FID | ERP (W) | Class | FCC info |
|---|---|---|---|---|---|---|
| K227AE | 93.3 FM | Redding, California | 40830 | 250 | D | LMS |
