= KGRV =

- Winston, Oregon; United States
- Broadcast area: Douglas County - Coos County
- Frequency: 700 kHz
- Branding: KVIP Radio

Programming
- Format: Christian radio (KVIP-FM simulcast)

Ownership
- Owner: Pacific Cascade Communications Corporation

History
- First air date: February 12, 1984

Technical information
- Licensing authority: FCC
- Facility ID: 51181
- Class: B
- Power: 23,000 watts (day); 470 watts (night)
- Transmitter coordinates: 43°8′39.4″N 123°27′37.3″W

Links
- Public license information: Public file; LMS
- Webcast: Listen live
- Website: kvip.org

KGRV is a Christian radio station licensed to Winston, Oregon, broadcasting on 700 AM. The station is owned by Pacific Cascade Communications Corporation.

== Programming ==
KGRV's programming consists of Christian talk and teaching, as well as Christian music. Christian talk and teaching programs heard on KGRV include; Turning Point with David Jeremiah, Thru the Bible with J. Vernon McGee, In Touch with Dr. Charles Stanley, Grace to You with John MacArthur, Focus on the Family, In the Market with Janet Parshall, Insight for Living with Chuck Swindoll, Running to Win with Erwin Lutzer and Unshackled!.

In December 2020 KGRV switched to a full simulcast of KVIP-FM 98.1 Redding, California.
