= KESR =

- Shasta Lake, California; United States
- Broadcast area: Redding / Red Bluff / Corning
- Frequency: 107.1 MHz
- Branding: 107.1 Bob FM

Programming
- Format: Adult hits

Ownership
- Owner: Results Radio; (Results Radio of Redding Licensee, LLC)
- Sister stations: KEWB, KHRD, KNCQ, KYTO

History
- First air date: 1998
- Former call signs: KISK (1998–2001)

Technical information
- Licensing authority: FCC
- Facility ID: 82867
- Class: C3
- ERP: 1,400 watts
- HAAT: 415 meters (1,362 ft)
- Transmitter coordinates: 40°39′06″N 122°31′32″W
- Translator: 93.7 K229CA (Redding)

Links
- Public license information: Public file; LMS
- Webcast: Listen live
- Website: 1071bobfm.com

KESR (107.1 FM, "107.1 Bob FM") is a radio station licensed to Redding, California, United States, broadcasting to Shasta & Tehama Counties. The station is owned by Results Radio of Redding Licensee, LLC.

This station has gone through many format changes. For several years it was called "Star 107.1" and was an "adult contemporary" station with local shows. In 2005, it became an "adult hits" formatted "Jack FM" station. On March 12, 2010, Bob FM replaced Jack FM on 107.1, making it the second station owned by Results Radio to do so.

The station's construction permit was originally licensed by the Federal Communications Commission (FCC) to long-time North State broadcaster Steve Thomas and then the license was transferred to McCarthy Wireless, Inc. (licensee of other Redding area radio stations).

Prior to being assigned by the FCC the call sign (call letters) of KESR, the station was originally licensed as KISK .

== Translators ==
KESR broadcasts on the following translator:

Call sign	Frequency	City of license	FID	ERP (W)	Class	FCC info
K229CA	93.7 FM	Redding, California	141377	99	D	LMS
