= Redding station (California) =

Train station in Redding, California, U.S.

Redding, CA
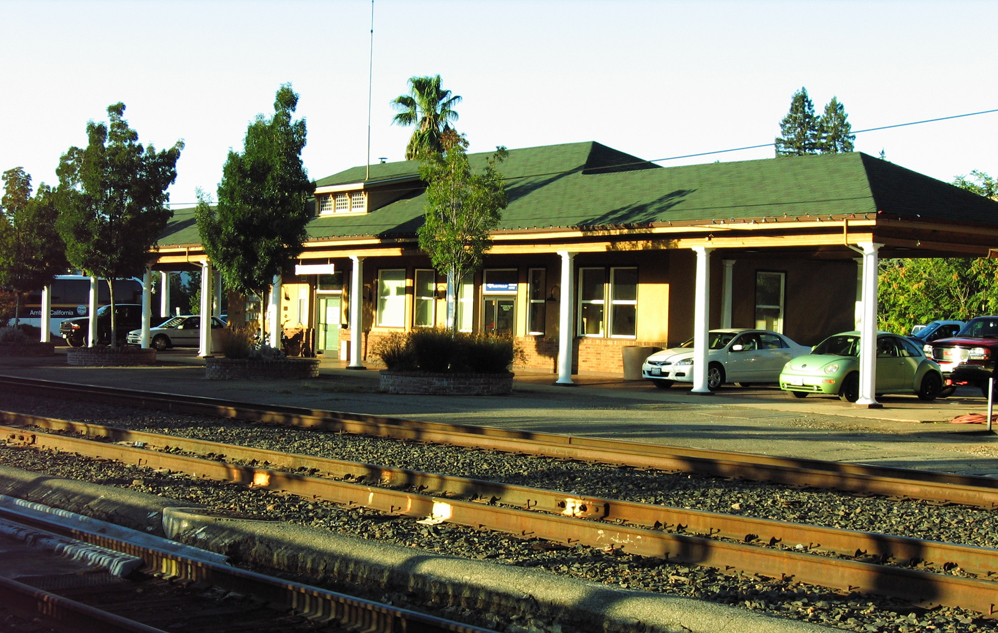
- Redding station in September 2009

General information
- Location: 1620 Yuba Street; Redding, California; United States
- Coordinates: 40.5837°N 122.3934°W
- Owner: Union Pacific
- Line: UP Valley Subdivision
- Platforms: 1 side platform
- Tracks: 3
- Bus stands: 12
- Bus operators: Amtrak Thruway: 5; Greyhound Lines; FlixBus; Redding Area Bus Authority: 2, 3, 5, 7, 11, 14, AC, BE, CTE, SE; Sage Stage: Redding/Alturas; Trinity Transit: Redding/Weaverville

Construction
- Parking: Yes
- Cycle facilities: Racks
- Accessible: Yes

Other information
- Station code: Amtrak: RDD

History
- Opened: September 1, 1872
- Rebuilt: July 1923–February 5, 1924; 2002
- Original company: Southern Pacific

Passengers
- FY 2025: 8,505 (Amtrak)

Services
Preceding station	Amtrak	Following station
Chico toward Los Angeles	Coast Starlight	Dunsmuir toward Seattle
Former services
Preceding station	Amtrak	Following station
Gerber (until 1972) toward Los Angeles	Coast Starlight	Dunsmuir toward Seattle
Davis (1972–1974) toward Los Angeles	Coast Starlight	Dunsmuir toward Seattle
Orland (1974–1982) toward Los Angeles	Coast Starlight	Dunsmuir toward Seattle
Preceding station	Southern Pacific Railroad	Following station
Anderson toward Oakland Pier	Shasta Route	Matheson toward Portland
Location

Redding station is an intercity train station served by Amtrak's Coast Starlight, located in Redding, California, United States. The depot was built by the Southern Pacific Railroad in 1923 and opened on February 5, 1924. The train station has sheltered waiting areas on both platforms and a parking lot near the southbound platform.

Due to the way schedules are aligned, both the northbound and the southbound Coast Starlight pass through Redding in the middle of the night, when no connecting transit systems are usually operating. Amtrak Thruway motorcoach route 3 provides additional service in northern California during the daytime hours, connecting Redding to Chico, Davis, Sacramento and Stockton, where passengers can connect to Gold Runner trains.

Redding Area Bus Authority's Downtown Transit Center is located on the opposite side of the tracks from the station. The transit center is the main transit hub in Shasta County, served by most Redding Area Bus Authority routes, along with other interregional transportation services including Greyhound Lines, Sage Stage and Trinity Transit.

North State Intercity Bus service has been proposed for weekday commuters from Redding to Sacramento, following a route similar to the twice daily Amtrak Thruway 3
