= Trinity Transit =

Public bus service in Trinity County, California

- Parent: Trinity County Department of Transportation
- Founded: 1988
- Headquarters: Weaverville, California
- Locale: Trinity County, California
- Service area: Trinity, Shasta and Humboldt counties
- Service type: Intercity bus service
- Routes: 4
- Website: trinitytransit.org

Trinity Transit is a public transportation service in Trinity County, California, United States. It provides services between the communities of Douglas City, Hayfork, Junction City, Lewiston, Redding, Weaverville and Willow Creek. Regional services connect with neighbouring systems: the Redding Area Bus Authority and Redding Amtrak station in Redding, and the Redwood Transit System and Klamath-Trinity Non-Emergency Medical Transportation in Willow Creek. Trinity Transit is operated by the Trinity County Department of Transportation.

== History ==
Trinity Transit was originally operated by the Human Response Network (HRN), which began service in 1988. Service was available to Hayfork, Douglas City, Lewiston, Weaverville and Junction City. After several months of operation, the service to Lewiston and Junction City was discontinued, leaving the Hayfork to Weaverville service, which included Douglas City. In March 2008, service was reinstated to Lewiston as a pilot program, along with two new routes to Trinity Center and Willow Creek. The route to Trinity Center was discontinued after Labor Day in 2009 due to poor ridership. After procuring buses through the American Recovery and Reinvestment Act of 2009, intercity service between Weaverville and Willow Creek was increased to three days per week initially, and a route between Weaverville and Redding began.

== Fixed route services ==
Trinity Transit operates four intercity fixed routes, all of which run from Weaverville.

Route	Area served	Trip frequency
Redding Line	Weaverville to/from Redding	Two round trips, Monday to Friday
Willow Creek Line	Weaverville to/from Willow Creek	Two round trips, Monday to Friday
Hayfork Line	Weaverville to/from Hayfork	Two round trips, Monday, Wednesday and Friday
Lewiston Line	Weaverville to/from Lewiston	Two round trips

A single connection between the Redding Line and the Willow Creek Line is available at Weaverville once a day, so a round trip between Willow Creek and Redding cannot be made in one day on Trinity Transit.
