= KVIP =

Radio station in Redding, California

KVIP and KVIP-FM
Redding, California; United States
- Frequencies: KVIP: 540 kHz; KVIP-FM: 98.1 MHz

Programming
- Format: Christian radio

Ownership
- Owner: Pacific Cascade Communications

History
- First air date: KVIP: December 19, 1957; KVIP-FM: 1975
- Call sign meaning: Very Important People of Northern California

Technical information
- Licensing authority: FCC
- Facility ID: KVIP: 51177; KVIP-FM: 51183
- Class: KVIP: D; KVIP-FM: C
- Power: KVIP: 2,500 watts (day); 14 watts (night)
- ERP: KVIP-FM: 30,000 watts
- HAAT: KVIP-FM: 521 meters (1,709 ft)
- Transmitter coordinates: KVIP: 40°37′24.5″N 122°16′53″W; KVIP-FM: 40°39′17.5″N 122°31′25″W
- Translator(s): See § Translators

Links
- Public license information: KVIP: Public file; LMS; KVIP-FM: Public file; LMS
- Webcast: Listen Live
- Website: kvip.org

KVIP and KVIP-FM are Christian radio stations in Redding, California, United States, broadcasting at 540 kHz on the AM band, 98.7 and 98.1 MHz on the FM band. The FM station's programming is also carried on a regional network of transmitters and translators in far northern California and southern Oregon, including three high-power stations: KNDZ (89.3 MHz) in McKinleyville, California, covering Eureka; KMWR (90.7 MHz) in Brookings, Oregon; and KGRV (700 kHz), an AM station serving Roseburg, Oregon.

KVIP has operated with a Christian format since January 1970. Prior to then, it was a commercial station between 1958 and 1969.

== History ==
=== Commercial station (1958–1969) ===
The Shasta Broadcasting Corporation was granted a construction permit to build a new radio station at 540 kHz in Redding on December 12, 1956. Shasta Broadcasting was associated with Shasta Telecasters, which had put KVIP-TV channel 7 on the air on August 1 of that year. The radio station entered into service on December 19, 1957, broadcasting with 1,000 watts during daytime hours only.

In 1965, KVIP moved to new studios on Radio Lane which had been previously occupied by station KVCV, which had built new facilities for itself. By that time, the television station had been sold, and instead, the firm had purchased a TV station in Fresno, KJEO-TV, and an ice rink. On April Fool's Day 1966, KVIP and KAHR (1330 AM) engaged in a prank by which the two stations switched signals for the day; lines were run between the two stations to allow them to broadcast each other's programming. Callers flooded both stations' switchboards, one even thinking the stunt was a "John Birch Society plot", as the event led to what KVIP manager Donald Chamberlain termed "mass confusion".

Two years later, however, KAHR would have a major impact on the history of KVIP beyond a one-day prank. In early 1968, KAHR was placed into bankruptcy and sold at auction. The buyer was Carl McConnell, who, in addition to being a shareholder in Shasta Broadcasting, owned KVIQ-TV channel 6 in Eureka with his wife, Leah, through the California Northwest Broadcasting Company. That firm paid $55,000 for KAHR's assets; McConnell pledged to divest himself of his shares in Shasta. That May, several KVIP staffers left the station to work for KAHR.

Carl and Leah McConnell sold their stock in Shasta Broadcasting to its other shareholders, and as a result, the other investors opted to put KVIP on the market. The Bethel Church of Redding obtained an option to purchase the station for between $50,000 and $60,000, proposing a religious format. It was unable to raise the funds needed to buy the station, however, and two buyers—one from Eugene, Oregon, and another from Fresno—visited Redding to scout out a potential purchase.

On January 17, 1969, Shasta opted to discontinue operations of KVIP and its adult contemporary format after no buyer surfaced. With the station silent, there was some interest by local schools in purchasing the station for use as an educational broadcast outlet on a noncommercial basis.

=== Reborn as a Christian station ===
In June 1969, a group of churchmen incorporated as Northern California Communications Corporation reached a deal to purchase KVIP from Shasta and its associated equipment from McConnell. The group included representation from several local Christian churches. The FCC approved of the transfer that December, and KVIP returned to the air on January 4, 1970, from new studios in Enterprise. When the station held a fundraising drive that June, it received gifts from as far as Sacramento and Modesto. Some of its programming in the early years came from Family Radio, though this was eliminated in the early 1980s.

The reincarnation of KVIP as a Christian radio station was seen as ironic by some of its supporters. Under Shasta and station manager Donald Chamberlain, the station was known for sometimes controversial editorial and talk show programs. Royal Blue, a pastor who was one of the founding associates in the station's relaunch, noted in a 2012 newspaper article that these editorials regularly spurred the ire of the women that attended his Wednesday night prayer meetings, who in turn began praying for the station to go off the air.

In October 1974, the FCC granted Northern California Communications Corporation another construction permit, this one to build an FM station on 98.1 MHz. KVIP-FM, which started in 1975, broadcast a split program due to the FM Non-Duplication Rule, which limited the amount of programming the two frequencies could share. It was also the only FM service in the area when it started, as several other stations had been established but failed to take root. In 1978, the first FM translator was set up: K240AG (95.9 FM), bringing the KVIP signal to Nubieber.

In January 1979, vandals damaged the KVIP tower. The station attempted to move its facilities to the Churn Creek Bottom area, but the Shasta County Board of Supervisors ruled that a broadcast tower could not be placed in a light agricultural area, so it instead sought and received approval to replace its former 325-foot (99 m) mast with a new 450-foot (140 m) tower. By 1989, there were twelve translators in service, and KVIP had begun operating KGRV in the Roseburg area; at this time, the station aired a mix of primarily local daytime programming and evening shows produced by Moody Radio; the parent corporation had changed its name to the present Pacific Cascade moniker. Among the most popular programs was the station's ministry to shut-ins; the station solicited cards and letters of encouragement from its listeners to send to the homebound.

In 1992, KVIP raised funds to acquire a 30-acre (12 ha) plot of land so it could own its own transmitter site.

In 2024, KVIP moved from its longtime studios on Hartnell Avenue (which building had changed ownership) to a new facility located on Lake Blvd. near the former KGEC facility.

== Translators ==
Call sign	Frequency (MHz)	City of license	State	FCC info	Rebroadcasts
K215DJ	90.9	Meadview	Arizona	FCC (K215DJ)	KVIP-FM
K245CP	96.9	Alturas & Termo	California	FCC (K245CP)	KVIP-FM
K212FD	90.3	Azalea	California	FCC (K212FD)	KVIP-FM
K279AG	103.7	Burney & Montgomery	California	FCC (K279AG)	KVIP-FM
K207CR	89.3	Cedarville	California	FCC (K207CR)	KVIP-FM
K218CZ	91.5	Coarsegold	California	FCC (K218CZ)	KVIP-FM
K212FF	90.3	Dorris	California	FCC (K212FF)	KVIP-FM
K202DA	88.3	Fort Jones	California	FCC (K202DA)	KVIP-FM
K208DU	89.5	Happy Camp	California	FCC (K208DU)	KVIP-FM
K269DD	101.7	Lakehead, Etc.	California	FCC (K269DD)	KVIP-FM
K240AG	95.9	Nubieber & McArthur	California	FCC (K240AG)	KVIP-FM
K254CN	98.7	Redding	California	FCC (K254CN)	KVIP
K249CS	97.7	Susanville, Etc.	California	FCC (K249CS)	KVIP-FM
K296BF	107.1	Weaverville, Etc.	California	FCC (K296BF)	KVIP-FM
K224AO	92.7	Weed	California	FCC (K224AO)	KVIP-FM
K300AI	107.9	Willow Creek	California	FCC (K300AI)	KNDZ
K214BS	90.7	Yreka	California	FCC (K214BS)	KVIP-FM
K232BH	94.3	Yreka	California	FCC (K232BH)	KVIP-FM
K208FN	89.5	Burns	Oregon	FCC (K208FN)	KVIP-FM
K219LR	91.7	Chemult	Oregon	FCC (K219LR)	KVIP-FM
K204GH	88.7	Chiloquin	Oregon	FCC (K204GH)	KVIP-FM
K202DH	88.3	Condon	Oregon	FCC (K202DH)	KVIP-FM
K213DM	90.5	Heppner	Oregon	FCC (K213DM)	KVIP-FM
K260AK	99.9	Klamath Falls	Oregon	FCC (K260AK)	KVIP-FM
K288DF	105.5	Lakeview, Etc.	Oregon	FCC (K288DF)	KVIP-FM
K212DO	90.3	Oakridge	Oregon	FCC (K212DO)	KVIP-FM
K208EC	89.5	Silver Lake	Oregon	FCC (K208EC)	KVIP-FM
K257DT	99.3	Sunriver	Oregon	FCC (K257DT)	KVIP-FM
