= KNCQ =

Coordinates: 40.603°N 122.651°W

- Weaverville, California; United States
- Broadcast area: Redding / Red Bluff / Chico
- Frequency: 97.3 MHz
- Branding: Q-97

Programming
- Format: Country

Ownership
- Owner: Results Radio of Redding Licensee, LLC
- Sister stations: KESR, KEWB, KHRD, KYTO

History
- First air date: October 29, 1985
- Call sign meaning: Northern California's Q-97

Technical information
- Licensing authority: FCC
- Facility ID: 40828
- Class: C
- ERP: 28,000 watts
- HAAT: 1,088 meters

Links
- Public license information: Public file; LMS
- Webcast: Listen live
- Website: q97country.com

KNCQ (97.3 FM, "Q-97") is a commercial radio station in Weaverville, California. KNCQ has aired a country music format since 1985. KNCQ broadcasts all the way from Medford, Oregon to Sacramento, California.

== History ==
KNCQ (Q97FM) signed "on-the-air" on October 29, 1985. The station was built from the ground up by the late Craig McCarthy along with his brother and father as partners of McCarthy Wireless, Inc. The station's original studios and offices were located at 2551 Park Marina Drive in the old circular Daniels Furniture Building, in Redding. Craig McCarthy was the first "weather man" the station had. In an effort to add more voices to the station's airwaves, McCarthy would pre-record weather updates in the morning that would air throughout the day. Circa 1990, Q97 relocated to studios in a building McCarthy constructed at 1588 Charles Drive in North Redding. The station, along with its sister stations, remain at this location.

KNCQ-FM 97.3 (Q97), is licensed by the Federal Communications Commission (FCC) as a Class "C" signal with a maximum permissible radiated signal of 100,000 watts at an elevation at no more than 2,000 feet height above average terrain (HAAT). Since the transmitter is actually at close to 3,570 feet HAAT, the effective radiated power output is capped at 28,000 watts which produces Equivalent Effective Radiated Power (EERP) of a full 100,000 watts. KNCQ-FM is among the top 25 strongest FM signals in the United States and reaches all or part of 17 counties in California and Oregon.

Q97 has been billed many ways over the last 22 years. It has been called "KNCQ-FM," "Q97FM," "The Country Giant," and "Today's Country Q97." The station currently plays "Today's Country Variety". Gary Popejoy helmed the Q97 morning show as well as serving as operation manager and program director for about 9 years, from the very beginning in 1985 to about 1994, when the morning slot was turned over to Dave Tappan. Dave Tappan was later joined by Bob Thomas (Dave & Bob). In 1999 Dave and Bob jumped ship to upstart Country station B103, and later ended up at Star 107.1. Billy Pilgrim and Patrick John, as "Billy & Patrick Mornings" were tapped to move their show to Q97. Dave & Bob later split up due to medical issues with Bob. Bob Thomas later re-joined the Q97 staff as the weekend host. Bob Thomas died of natural causes on May 26, 2007. Dave Tappan went on to host further morning shows on Star 107.1 & Red 103.1 & 93.3. Dave also co-hosted a mid-morning TV show called "Your Show Live" on KNVN (NBC) & KHSL (CBS) with former Mrs. California, Shaye Leeper. On March 3, 2010, Dave Tappan returned to KNCQ as the afternoon host on Q97. The popular "Billy & Patrick Mornings on Q97" has been very successful, and KNCQ continues to rank number one in the market's 12+ ratings according to the Arbitron Company. Having worked together for over 22 years, "Billy & Patrick Mornings" is the longest running morning show team in Redding. Q97 has always had a strong local presence in Northern California due to its massive signal and continued belief in a local, live staff, as most stations now air mostly pre-recorded or syndicated programs.

== Programming ==
Q97 plays today's hit country from artists like Tim McGraw, Carrie Underwood, Luke Bryan, Blake Shelton, Taylor Swift, Sam Hunt, Zac Brown Band, Kenny Chesney, Miranda Lambert, Lady Antebellum, Brad Paisley, Jason Aldean, Joe Nichols, Rascal Flatts and Keith Urban. The station Program Director is Rick Healy.

=== Current station lineup ===
- Weekdays

6-10am - Billy and Patrick Mornings (Billy Pilgrim and Patrick John)

- 10am-3pm - Dave Tappan
- 3-7pm - Houston K
- Weekend and Part-time staff includes Don Potter.

== Parent Company ==
"Results Radio LLC" of Redding is Q97's parent company. The company is small by radio standards and owns licenses from the FCC to operate a total of 13 radio stations in Redding, Chico, Sacramento, and Yuba City, all in California. Q97's sister stations in Redding are KHRD-FM/RED 103.1 & 93.3(Classic Rock), KEWB-FM/Power 94(Rhythmic CHR), KESR-FM/BOB 107.1, and KKXS-FM/XS SPORTS 96.1. All five stations are in the same broadcasting complex in north Redding. The parent company website is www.resultsradio.com

== Notable staff ==
Station Alumni include original staff members Gary Popejoy, Terri Ann Clark, Randall Whitney (Chapman), Paul Baker, Jim Morris, Sue Sandifer (Kerr), Steve Thomas, and Jan McCaleb. Others that call or have called Q97 home; Rick Healy, Beau Jordan, Kelly Servis, Paul Bryan, Jim Davison, Dave D'Angelo, Kevin McFarland, Helen Chambers, Mike Jones, Dave Tappan, Ryan O Brian, Jeana Williams, Bob Thomas, Chellie Lynn, Robert Christopher, Don Potter and Houston K. Current On-Air staff includes Billy Pilgrim and Patrick John (Billy & Patrick Mornings), Dave Tappan (Mid-day's), Rick Healy (Afternoons) and Houston K at nights. Weekend hosts also include Dave Tappan, Gary Moore, Don Potter and the Crook & Chase Countdown Sunday afternoons at 3pm.

At 55 years old, longtime Q97 personality Bob Thomas died of natural causes on Saturday May 26, 2007. He started at former rock/country station B-94.7 back in 1984, and also worked at KRDG and Q102, then landed a job on the former Dave & Bob show on Q97 in 2000. Most recently, Bob had returned to Q97 as the weekend host.
