= KLXR =

- Redding, California; United States
- Frequency: 1230 kHz
- Branding: Relevant Radio

Programming
- Format: Catholic radio
- Affiliations: Relevant Radio

Ownership
- Owner: Michael R. Quinn
- Sister stations: KCNR

History
- First air date: August 1956
- Former call signs: KRDG (1956–1982); KPAK (1982–1989)

Technical information
- Licensing authority: FCC
- Facility ID: 55413
- Class: C
- Power: 1,000 watts
- Transmitter coordinates: 40°33′13.5″N 122°22′57″W

Links
- Public license information: Public file; LMS
- Webcast: Listen live
- Website: relevantradio.com

KLXR (1230 AM) is a radio station based in Redding, California. The station owner is Michael R. Quinn, former owner of KCNR (1460 AM). The station is an affiliate of the Catholic talk network Relevant Radio.

The station was originally licensed as KRDG, changed callsigns to KPAK on December 17, 1982, and finally to KLXR on May 12, 1989. Ownership of KPAK was changed in June 1987 from Martineau Broadcasting to Radio KPAK Incorporated with Franke Clark President and Richard Eisman C.E.O. and sold to Michael R. Quinn on May 12, 1989.

At midnight on January 1, 2018, KLXR went silent. The station returned to the air in 2021 as a Relevant Radio affiliate.

== Past ownership ==
- M.C. Allen Productions (KMCA (defunct), KMCA-TV)
- Four Rivers Broadcasting (KSYC-FM, KNTK)
- Radio KPAK Incorporated KPAK Radio
