= KYTO (FM) =

Coordinates: 40.488°N 121.901°W

- Shingletown, California; United States
- Broadcast area: Redding/Red Bluff/Corning
- Frequency: 96.1 MHz
- Branding: 96 KTO

Programming
- Format: Oldies
- Affiliations: The True Oldies Channel

Ownership
- Owner: Results Radio; (Results Radio of Redding Licensee, LLC)
- Sister stations: KESR, KEWB, KHRD, KNCQ

History
- First air date: 2001
- Former call signs: KBHX (1998–2001); KKXS (2001–2024)

Technical information
- Licensing authority: FCC
- Facility ID: 83787
- Class: C3
- ERP: 1,900 watts
- HAAT: 358 meters

Links
- Public license information: Public file; LMS
- Website: 96ktoredding.com

KYTO (96.1 MHz, "96 KTO") is a commercial FM radio station licensed in Shingletown, California, broadcasting to the Shasta & Tehama County areas. KYTO airs an oldies format and is an affiliate of The True Oldies Channel. Until 2024, it was the region's affiliate station for the San Francisco Giants, the San Francisco 49ers and the San Jose Sharks.

== History ==
KYTO was once the home for "Red 96.1" (KBHX) (now on 103.1 and 93.3) from 2001 until 2003, then it was the home of "Kicks 96", a country station that was a more classic country alternative to Q-97 until 2005. The station was an affiliate of Broadcast Architecture's Smooth Jazz Network until March 1, 2010, when KKXS switched to ESPN Radio. The station also broadcast live video webstreams of Shasta College Knights football.

On February 13, 2024 (by coincidence, doing so just two days after the 49ers' loss in Super Bowl LVIII), the station abruptly dropped the sports talk format and flipped to oldies, joining The True Oldies Channel network, as "96 KTO, Redding's True Oldies", immediately applying to change callsigns to KYTO to match. The station changed its call sign to KYTO on February 18.

== Previous logos ==
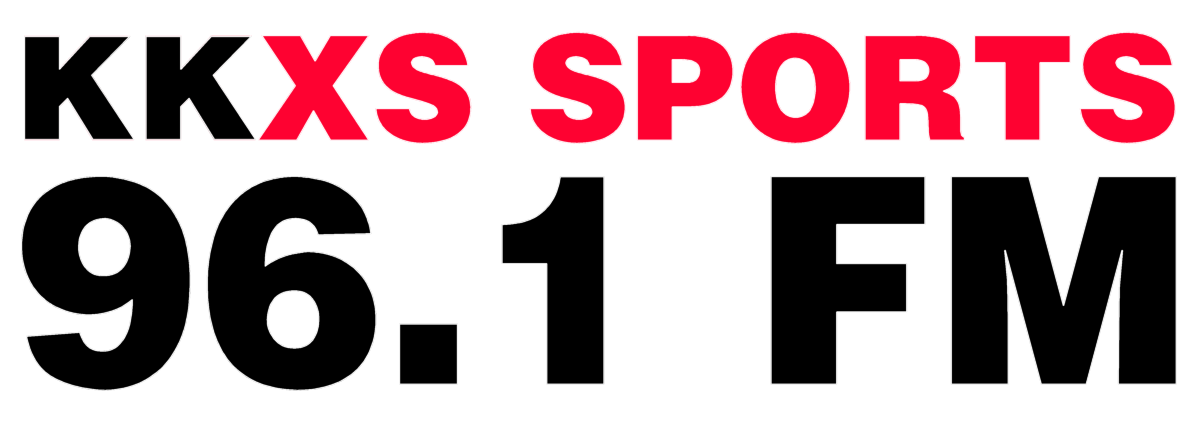
