= KEWB (FM) =

Coordinates: 40.6515°N 122.5267°W

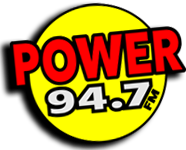
- Anderson, California; United States
- Broadcast area: Redding / Red Bluff / Corning
- Frequency: 94.7 MHz
- Branding: Power 94

Programming
- Format: Contemporary hit radio
- Affiliations: Compass Media Networks; Premiere Networks

Ownership
- Owner: Results Radio; (Results Radio of Redding License, LLC)
- Sister stations: KCEZ, KTHU, KBQB, KESR, KRQR, KHRD, KNCQ, KYTO

History
- First air date: March 20, 1983; 43 years ago

Technical information
- Licensing authority: FCC
- Facility ID: 54487
- Class: C2
- ERP: 4,200 watts
- HAAT: 477 meters (1,565 ft)

Links
- Public license information: Public file; LMS
- Webcast: Listen live
- Website: power94radio.com

KEWB (94.7 MHz, "Power 94-7") is a commercial FM radio station in Anderson, California, broadcasting to the Northern California area. KEWB airs a contemporary hit radio music format, which it has had from March 20, 1983 until August 1993 and again since August 19, 1999.

== Station History ==
From its inception on March 20, 1983, until August 1993, they were a Top 40/CHR station as "B94". It would be later known as "B-94.7" and "The Killer Bee". In 1991-92, B-94.7 featured Coy & Company in the morning, Wild Bill Shakespeare in the afternoon drive, and "Hojo" -Howard Johnson, nights. From August 1993 to August 19, 1999, it was a country station called B-94.7. After 6 years as a country station, KEWB became (Power 94) on August 19 of that year.

On February 23, 2011, KEWB's sister station in Chico, California, KCEZ changed formats from oldies to top 40, branded as "Power 102". The station's direction is patterned after KEWB.
