= Sage Stage =

Public transportation operator in Modoc County, California

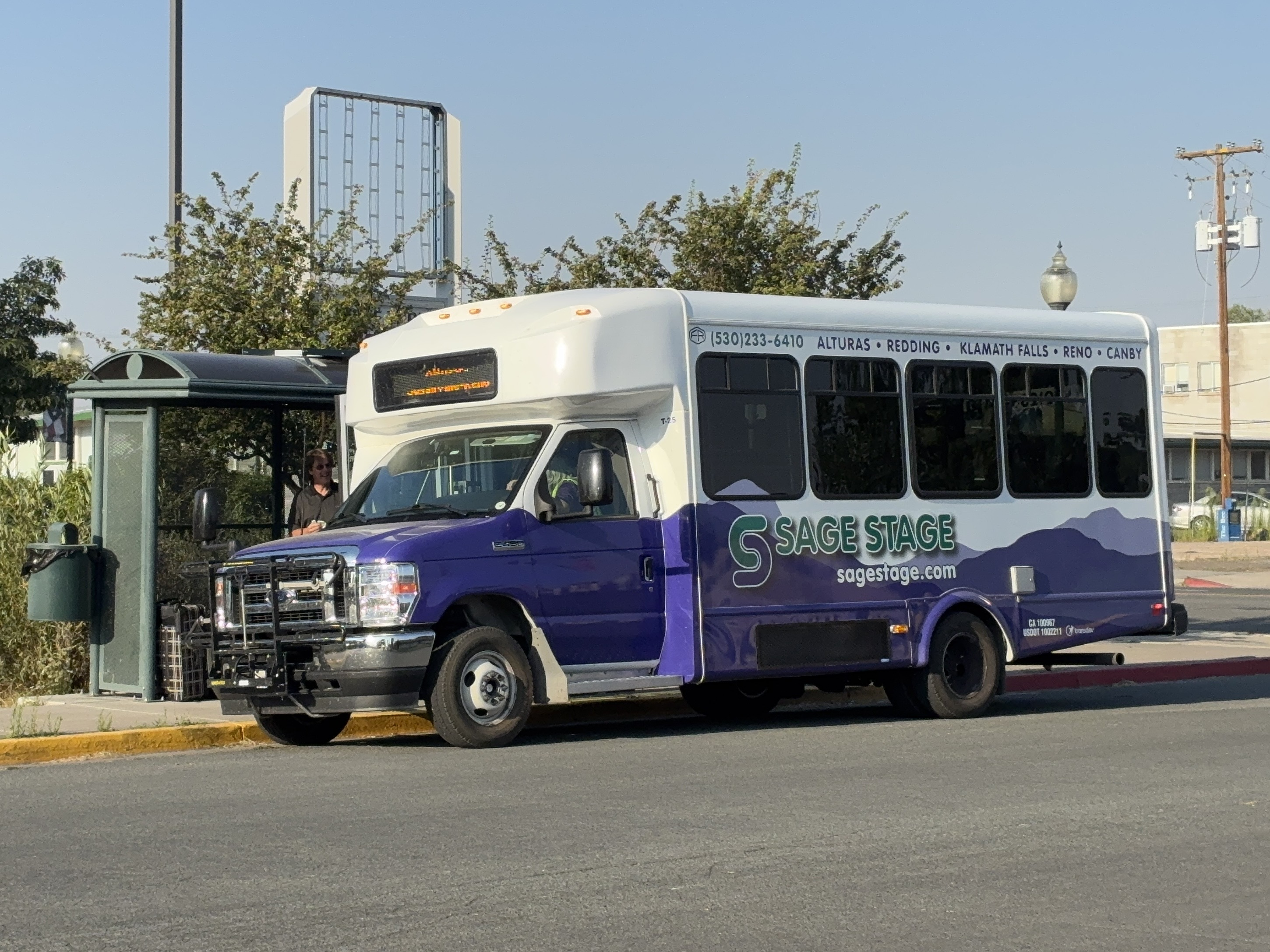
- Reno bus departing in Alturas
- Parent: Modoc Transportation Agency
- Founded: 1976
- Headquarters: Alturas, California
- Locale: Alturas, California
- Service area: Modoc County, California
- Service type: Bus service, paratransit, demand-responsive transport, intercity bus service
- Routes: 4 intercity routes, local demand-response service
- Fleet: 5 lift-equipped cutaway buses
- Website: sagestage.com

Sage Stage is a regional transit agency in Modoc County California that offers fixed routes and on-demand services in Alturas, California.

The agency’s objective is to offer safe and dependable transportation within Modoc County, providing both local dial-a-ride buses, as well as intercity services with the help of partnership with Transdev.

== Services ==
=== Fixed Routes ===
Sage Stage operates four fixed-routes in and out of Modoc County. All fixed routes depart from the intersection at Main and West Fifth.

Fares on the intercity buses can range from $4.50 to $50.00.

SAGE STAGE Fixed Routes
Route	Terminus	Via	Terminus	Notes
RENO	Alturas	Madeline, Susanville	Reno	
REDDING	Alturas	Adin, Fall River Mills, Burney	Redding	Connects with RABA 299X bus.
KLAMATH FALLS	Alturas	Tulelake	Klamath Falls	
CANBY	Alturas	CA 299	Canby	Shortest one out of the four routes.

=== On-demand Services ===
Sage Stage operates a dial-a-ride bus service within Alturas city limits. The service is divided into three zones, each with its own fare cost. Zone three requires a reservation before pickup.

Dial-a-ride Fares
Zone	Fare
1	$1.00
2	$2.00
3	$3.00

== See also ==
- Redding Area Bus Authority
- List of bus transit systems in the United States
