= Z Rock =

Syndicated radio format

- Type: Radio network
- Country: United States
- Availability: National
- Owner: ABC Radio Networks (through Capital Cities Communications (1986-1995); trademark currently owned by Cumulus Media; & The Walt Disney Company (1996 only))
- Launch date: September 1, 1986
- Dissolved: December 31, 1996

Z Rock was a nationally syndicated radio network based in Dallas, Texas, that, from the mid-1980s through the mid-1990s, played heavy metal and hard rock music. The format was one of several 24-hour satellite-delivered music formats offered by the pioneering Satellite Music Network (a company which in 1989 merged with ABC Radio Networks and later became Cumulus Media Networks). Z Rock debuted on Labor Day in 1986 with WZRC in Chicago as its first affiliate. During its early days, Z Rock drew attention for playing unedited, explicit versions of songs. In March 1990, Z Rock was nominated for the Billboard Awards, the only time a full-time hard rock/metal programming service has ever been so honored in the history of Billboard magazine. After several changes in personnel and programming direction, the network was discontinued on December 31, 1996.

== Programming ==
Program	Details
Blistering Leads	Program focused on guitar breaks and heroes.
Mandatory Metallica	Premiered in November 1986 and was the original Metallica feature copied by stations nationwide. "The Mighty Met" was a similar program that played a half-hour to an hour of Metallica songs (perhaps the most popular band on the network) and aired Saturday nights.
Nationwide Mid-day Requests	A daily all request show.
Z-Rock 5	Nightly countdown of the top five requested songs of the day. Prizes awarded to callers who could recite back the top five songs in the order that they were played.
Z-Rock 50	Weekly countdown of the network's top rock tracks aired Sunday nights. (Some non-affiliate stations also aired this program.)
Z-Rock 1000	End-of-the-year countdown of the all-time greatest rock songs with songs from the previous year included.
Headbanger's Heaven	Program featuring heavy metal including demos and imports hosted by Crazy Mike Paine. Featured thrash, speed, death, and power metal genres as well as several world premieres, contests and interviews.
Coast to Coast Concert Series	Over 50 live broadcast concerts featuring many of the genre's top names, including Metallica.
Wounded Radio	Sunday night show featuring heavier rock music hosted by Sharkmann.
US240	Saturday night all-request show spanning 240 minutes (4 hours) Originally hosted by Sharkmann.
Nightly Nuke	Weeknight feature where listeners called in and voted on the most despised top 40 song of the day (usually a contemporary pop song). Once the votes were totaled, the winning song would be played with unflattering soundbytes mixed throughout it. After roughly a minute, a loud explosion sound would be played, essentially destroying or "nuking" the song.
Back-Rockwards	Nightly phone-in contest to guess identity of backwards played song (song was played in its entirety with random noises played over it).
Fast Forward	Similar to Back-Rockwards, but with the song played forwards at about 10 times the speed.
Bad-Ass CD Side	Weekly playing of half of an entire CD. Was notably promoted by saying, "'Bad-ass CD half' is grammatically correct, but 'Bad-ass CD side' sounds cooler!"
Too Much	Program held one Saturday a month that would give about four hours playing songs from a select artist. Eventually "Too much" would become a daily mid-day show with one hour of music from any artist sometimes featuring deep album cuts.
Old Stuff for an Hour	Sunday morning classic rock show. Hosted by Crankin Craig.
New Stuff for an Hour	Hosted by Crankin Craig, this show featured new music.
Your Stuff for an Hour (later Two Hours)	Hosted by Crankin, as an all request show.
Z-Rock RIP News	News bits presented in conjunction with RIP Magazine.
Z-Rock news	Commentary and opinions originally hosted by Boobie Bondage and heard in each daypart. The news went through several names and hosts: The Dirt (w/ Steve Show), The Mud (w/ Michelle), The Sludge with Sharkmann, The Drudge (not related to the internet news site Drudge Report) and just The News (both w/ Loud Debi Dowd).

== Marketing ==
Z Rock targeted fans of heavy metal and hard rock, a group that was increasingly ignored by conventional album-oriented rock (AOR) stations. As a result, the network had a massive economic impact on record labels, affiliate stations, and other businesses serving this largely untapped market. Metal and hard rock recording artists, particularly those signed to independent music labels, enjoyed greater exposure. Advertising sales to record companies as well as music retailers such as Camelot Music and Musicland increased significantly at Z Rock affiliates and music publications; Rolling Stone reported that accounts doubled in the several months since the network's launch.

The opening bumper for commercial breaks was an 8-note guitar riff from the first part of the song "House of 1,000 Pleasures" by Japanese band Ezo.

Various slogans used for Z Rock's imaging and promotions exuded a sense of rebellion and irreverence. Such sayings included the following:

- "If it's too loud, you're too old!"
- "Flip us on and flip them off"
- "We don't brake for wimps"
- "If you're not crankin' it, you must be yankin' it!"
- "Lock it in, and rip your knob off"

Another such slogan mocked classic rock programming, followed by "Who cares?! Z-Rock RULES!"

Marketed nationally for local broadcast with local commercials inserted, Z Rock's market penetration across the country varied considerably. While the local broadcasts were usually presented on FM radio, in some areas the network was carried by small AM outlets. Some publicity was provided for several years by the comic strip Funky Winkerbean, in which one of the main characters often wore a Z Rock T-shirt.

From 1989 to 1991, Z Rock produced Z-Rock Magazine, a print publication distributed free of charge in network affiliate cities.

Z Rock gained notoriety for its "mascot" vehicle, the "Z Rock hearse", which was displayed at various events and locations throughout the Dallas–Fort Worth metroplex. The vehicle ultimately was awarded to a lucky winner in a promotional giveaway. Dennis C. Weaver of Dallas drew the "lucky key" in a drawing held at Sound Climax, a Dallas car audio store which had outfitted the vehicle with stereo gear to showcase their products.

== Legacy ==
When the Z Rock radio network shut down at the end of 1996, affiliates were free to adopt the Z Rock name and/or imaging. Some stations continue to do so:

- KKZR, Internet radio station
- KRQR, Chico, California (adopted the classic logo of the former network)
- WXZZ, Lexington, Kentucky
- Z-ROCK INDY, LPFM and Internet Radio Station with studios in Indianapolis, Indiana

Cumulus Media, the successor to ABC's radio operations, owns the Z Rock trademark today, using it as a moniker for the above-mentioned WXZZ in order to keep the trademark active.

Tracy Barnes and Scorchin' Scotty went on to found HardRadio. Former Z-Rock DJs, Madd Maxx Hammer and Jason Lee Tipton are currently on D-Rock, a digital hard-rock radio station.

A fully moderated, 24-hour modern rock radio stream is still being produced for the Armed Forces Network (AFN) and is available on the digital AFN satellite lineup (with AFN Uninterruptable Voice the only unencrypted offering on the European AFN Hot Bird transponder).

The weekly, four-hour modern-rock chart program Z-Rock 50 was part of AFN The Eagle and could be heard in many locations throughout Europe and the Middle East. In the United Kingdom, the show was briefly heard on Beacon Radio but had a longer run on GWR. It was taken off the air in early 2009. The program was also available to other broadcasters worldwide from ABC Radio Networks International (now Citadel Media Networks).

Citadel Media in 2010 launched a new satellite active rock service called The Nerve. Unlike traditional rock stations and networks, The Nerve personalities are rock music core listeners who happen to be on the radio, instead of the DJs themselves.

KKZR (Z Rock 106.9) is an internet-only radio station based on the original Z-Rock network. Songs are played unedited, and feature some radio commercial from video game Grand Theft Auto V. This station uses the original zombie head Z-Rock logo from 1986.

Z-ROCK INDY (99.9 formerly 103.9) is a LPFM and internet radio station based on the original Z-Rock network.

The Bulgarian radio station Z-Rock uses the name of the network.
