= KCEZ =

Coordinates: 39.888°N 122.628°W

- Los Molinos, California; United States
- Broadcast area: Chico / Colusa / Corning
- Frequency: 102.1 MHz
- Branding: Power 102.1

Programming
- Format: Top 40

Ownership
- Owner: Results Radio of Chico License, LLC
- Sister stations: KEWB (FM)

History
- First air date: 1998 (as KTHU)
- Former call signs: KAWF (1997–1998); KTHU (1998–1999)

Technical information
- Licensing authority: FCC
- Facility ID: 55437
- Class: B1
- ERP: 25,000 watts
- HAAT: 67 meters (220 ft)

Links
- Public license information: Public file; LMS
- Webcast: Listen live
- Website: power1021.com

KCEZ (102.1 FM) is a commercial radio station licensed to Los Molinos, California, broadcasting to the Butte and Tehama County areas. KCEZ airs CHR/Rhythmic Contemporary music format branded as "Power 102.1".

Previous logo

== Format History ==
- 1998-2011 Oldies
- 2011- CHR/Rhythmic Contemporary
