= Shasta Bible College and Graduate School =

Coordinates: 40.56604°N 122.31445°W

Shasta Bible College and Graduate School (SBC&GS) is a private Baptist college and graduate school in Redding, California. It is accredited by the Transnational Association of Christian Colleges and Schools (TRACS). SBC&GS has online and on-campus programs leading to certificates, diplomas and degrees in Biblical Studies and Christian Teacher Education, and both undergraduate and graduate degrees.
