= Redding Area Bus Authority =

Operator of public transportation in Shasta County, California

- Founded: 1976 (operation started November 1981)
- Headquarters: 777 Cypress Avenue
- Locale: Redding, California
- Service area: Shasta County, California
- Service type: bus service, paratransit microtransit
- Routes: 11
- Hubs: 3
- Daily ridership: 1,300 (weekdays, Q1 2026)
- Annual ridership: 411,800 (2025)
- Operator: MTM Transit
- Chief executive: John Andoh, Transit Manager
- Website: rabaride.com

The Redding Area Bus Authority (RABA) is the operator of public transportation in Shasta County, California. RABA is a joint-powers agency between the City of Redding, the City of Shasta Lake, the City of Anderson, and the County of Shasta.

The service provides countywide public transit services, including fixed-route, microtransit, vanpool, bikeshare subsidy, evening ride subsidy, and paratransit service.

RABA transports approximately 504,000 passenger trips annually on a fleet of 38 buses and vans.

== History ==
RABA was formed in 1976 by a joint powers agreement between the City of Redding and the County of Shasta to provide public transportation services within the Redding urbanized area. The agency began fixed-route and demand-response service in November 1981. The joint powers agreement was amended effective January 1, 1998, to include the City of Anderson and the City of Shasta Lake.

== Services ==
RABA provides fixed-route and on-demand services in the urban areas of Shasta County, along with vanpool and bikeshare services.

=== Fixed-Route Services ===
RABA has 11 fixed bus routes with a mix of commuter and regional routes.

RABA Fixed Routes
Route	Name	Terminus	Via	Terminus	Notes
1	Shasta Lake	Redding (Downtown Passenger Terminal)	Lake Bl, Oasis Rd, Shasta Dam Bl	Shasta Lake	Evening Runabout service available after fixed-route service ends.
3	South Redding	Redding (Downtown Passenger Terminal)	S Market St, Westside Rd	Clear Creek / Westside Rd	
4	Hartnell / Bechelli / Churn Creek	Redding (Downtown Passenger Terminal)	Hartnell Av, Bechelli Ln, Churn Creek Rd	Churn Creek	
5X	Gold Runner Thruway	Redding (Downtown Passenger Terminal)	Red Bluff, Orland, Williams, Sacramento Airport	Sacramento	Operated by RABA as part of the Amtrak Thruway network, providing connections to Gold Runner trains.
7	Shasta College	Redding (Downtown Passenger Terminal)	Pine St, Shasta View Dr	Shasta College	
9	Anderson	Redding (Downtown Passenger Terminal)	S Market St, SR 273	Anderson	
11	Central Redding Loop (Counter-clockwise)	Redding (Downtown Passenger Terminal)	Central Redding	Downtown Passenger Terminal	
14	Central Redding Loop (Clockwise)	Redding (Downtown Passenger Terminal)	Central Redding	Downtown Passenger Terminal	
19	Beach Bus	Redding (Downtown Passenger Terminal)	Whiskeytown National Recreation Area	Whiskeytown Beach	Seasonal (May through September).
44X	Shingletown Express	Redding (Downtown Passenger Terminal)	SR 44	Shingletown	
299X	Burney Express	Redding (Downtown Passenger Terminal)	SR 299	Burney	Connects with Sage Stage service.

=== On-demand services ===
In addition to its fixed-route bus network, RABA operates other transportation services. RABA Runabout is a reservation-based microtransit service providing curb-to-curb transportation within designated service zones. Introduced in 2024, it gradually replaced several low-ridership fixed routes and also provides evening and Sunday service in parts of the Redding urban area.

RABA also operates RABA Runner, an evening mobility program that subsidizes eligible Uber trips. Under the program, riders pay a flat fare while RABA covers the first portion of the trip cost during designated overnight service hours.

RABA operates RABA Response, an ADA complementary paratransit service for eligible riders whose disabilities prevent them from using the fixed-route bus system. The shared-ride, reservation-based service operates within the federally required ADA service area surrounding RABA's fixed routes.

RABA partners with Redding Bikeshare and Shasta Living Streets to operate RABA Roll, a bikeshare subsidy program. Eligible RABA riders may obtain vouchers for complimentary short-term bicycle rentals, providing first- and last-mile connections to destinations in downtown Redding.

RABA operates RABA Roundtrip, a vanpool program administered in partnership with Enterprise Mobility. The program supports commuters who share a common travel route by providing subsidized vanpool transportation as an alternative to driving alone.

ShastaConnect Rural Demand Response provides reservation-based, door-to-door transportation for residents of rural Shasta County outside RABA's urban fixed-route service area. The service is available to the general public and is intended to improve access to transportation in outlying communities.

RABA Rally is a mileage reimbursement program that reimburses approved volunteer drivers, including friends, family members, or neighbors, who provide transportation for eligible participants.

=== Charter service ===
RABA runs charter shuttle service for eligible governmental and nonprofit organizations in accordance with federal charter service regulations. Transportation is available by request for approved events and group travel.

== See also ==
- Redding station (California)
- List of bus transit systems in the United States
