= KRQR =

Radio station in Orland, California

Coordinates: 39.888°N 122.628°W

- Orland, California; United States
- Broadcast area: Chico, California; Paradise, California
- Frequency: 106.7 MHz
- Branding: 106.7 Z-Rock

Programming
- Format: Active rock
- Affiliations: Compass Media Networks

Ownership
- Owner: Results Radio of Chico Licensee, LLC (trademarks and branding under license from Cumulus Media)

History
- First air date: 1990
- Former call signs: KXHM (1990–1994); KDIG (1994–1996)
- Call sign meaning: Rock radio

Technical information
- Licensing authority: FCC
- Facility ID: 67691
- Class: B
- ERP: 50,000 watts
- HAAT: 94 meters (308 ft)

Links
- Public license information: Public file; LMS
- Webcast: Listen live
- Website: zrockfm.com

KRQR (106.7 FM) is a commercial radio station located in Orland, California, broadcasting to the entire Sacramento Valley. KRQR airs an active rock music format branded as "Z-Rock", adopting the branding and imaging formerly used by the satellite radio network of the same name.

The call letters were previously used by frequency 97.3 FM in San Francisco from 1982 to 1995.
