= KCNR =

- Shasta, California; United States
- Broadcast area: Redding, California
- Frequency: 1460 kHz
- Branding: KCNR 1460 AM

Programming
- Format: Conservative talk
- Affiliations: Fox News Radio; Compass Media Networks; Premiere Networks; Salem Radio Network; Westwood One

Ownership
- Owner: Free Fire Media

History
- First air date: 1967
- Former call signs: KAVA (1967–1996); KMCA (1996–2002)
- Former frequencies: 1450 kHz

Technical information
- Licensing authority: FCC
- Facility ID: 64414
- Class: B
- Power: 750 watts
- Transmitter coordinates: 40°33′13.5″N 122°22′57″W
- Translator: 96.5 K243CT (Redding)

Links
- Public license information: Public file; LMS
- Webcast: Listen live
- Website: kcnr1460.com

KCNR (1460 AM) is a radio station licensed to Shasta, California, United States. Owned by Free Fire Media, it primarily broadcasts a talk radio format with a mix of local and syndicated programming, most of which being conservative talk programs.

== History ==
In December 2009, the station was bought by former KQMS hosts Carl and Linda Bott, after their show Free Fire Radio was dropped by the station. It flipped to conservative talk as a competitor to KQMS, featuring their show as a morning show, joined by other local and syndicated shows.

== Translators ==
KCNR broadcasts on the following translator:

Call sign	Frequency	City of license	FID	ERP (W)	Class	FCC info
K243CT	96.5 FM	Redding, California	203013	99	D	LMS
