= Enterprise =

Enterprise (or the archaic spelling Enterprize) may refer to:

== Business terminology ==
- Business, economic activity done by a businessperson
- Big business, larger corporation commonly called "enterprise" in business jargon (excluding small and medium-sized businesses)
- Company, a legal entity practicing a business activity
- Enterprise architecture, a strategic management discipline within an organization
- Enterprise Capital Fund, a type of venture capital in the UK
- Entrepreneurship, the practice of starting new organizations, particularly new businesses
- Social enterprise, an organization that applies commercial strategies to improve well-being
- United Kingdom enterprise law, the regulation of businesses and public sector bodies within the economic constitution

== Businesses and organizations ==
=== Businesses ===
- Enterprise GP Holdings, an energy holding company
- Enterprise plc, a UK civil engineering and maintenance company
- Enterprise Productions, an American film production company that operated from 1946 to 1949
- Enterprise Products, a natural gas and crude oil pipeline company
- Enterprise Records, a record label
- Enterprise Rent-A-Car, a car rental Provider
  - Enterprise Holdings, the parent company
- The Enterprise Studios, a Burbank, California music recording studio

=== Other organizations ===
- Enterprize Canada, a student-run entrepreneurial competition and conference
- Enterprise for High School Students, a non-profit organization

== Computing ==
- Enterprise (computer), a 1980s UK 8-bit home computer, also known as Flan and Elan
- Enterprise resource planning (ERP), integrated management of core business processes or the technology supporting such management
- Enterprise software, business-oriented computer applications
- Enterprise storage, for large businesses
- Windows Enterprise, an edition of several versions of Microsoft Windows

== Entertainment and media ==
=== Television ===
- Star Trek: Enterprise, also Enterprise, a 2001-2005 television series
  - Enterprise (soundtrack), 2002, from the first season of the series
- Enterprice (British TV series), a 2018 television series

=== Fictional entities ===
==== Star Trek vessels ====
- Starship Enterprise, a list, timeline and brief description of starships in the fictional history of Star Trek
  - Enterprise (NX-01), the main setting of Star Trek: Enterprise
  - USS Enterprise (NCC-1701), from the original Star Trek television series and the first three Star Trek films
  - USS Enterprise (NCC-1701-A), from the fourth, fifth and sixth Star Trek films
  - USS Enterprise (NCC-1701-B), from the film Star Trek: Generations
  - USS Enterprise (NCC-1701-C), from the Star Trek: Next Generation episode "Yesterday's Enterprise"
  - USS Enterprise (NCC-1701-D), from Star Trek: The Next Generation (also two episodes of Star Trek: Picard)
  - USS Enterprise (NCC-1701-E), from the films Star Trek: First Contact, Star Trek: Insurrection, and Star Trek: Nemesis
  - USS Enterprise (NCC-1701-F), a non-player ship in the Star Trek Online video game which also appears in Star Trek: Picard
  - USS Enterprise (NCC-1701-G), from the Star Trek: Picard episode "The Last Generation"
  - USS Enterprise (NCC-1701-J), from the Star Trek: Enterprise episode "Azati Prime"

==== Other fictional vessels ====
- Enterprise, an airship in the game Final Fantasy IV
- Enterprise, an airship in the game Final Fantasy XIV
- Enterprise, the title ship in the 1959–1961 television series Riverboat
- Enterprise, a starship in H. Beam Piper's novel Space Viking

=== Newspapers ===
==== Australia ====
- The Enterprise (Katoomba), in Katoomba, New South Wales (1913)

==== United States ====
- Bastrop Daily Enterprise, in Louisiana
- Chico Enterprise-Record, in Chico, California
- High Point Enterprise, in North Carolina
- The Beaumont Enterprise, in Texas
- The Enterprise (Brockton), in Brockton, Massachusetts
- The Enterprise (Omaha), in Nebraska (1893–1914)
- Malheur Enterprise, in Malheur County, Oregon
- The Press-Enterprise, in Riverside, California (1885–1983)

== Places ==
=== Canada ===
- Enterprise, Northwest Territories, a hamlet
- Enterprise, a hamlet in the township of Stone Mills, Ontario
- Rural Municipality of Enterprise No. 142, Saskatchewan

=== United States ===
- Enterprise, Alabama, a city
- Enterprise, California (disambiguation)
- Enterprise, Florida, an unincorporated community
- Enterprise, Indiana, an unincorporated community
- Enterprise, Iowa, an unincorporated community
- Enterprise, Kansas, a city
- Enterprise, Louisiana, an unincorporated community
- Enterprise, Minnesota, an abandoned townsite
- Enterprise, Clarke County, Mississippi, a town
- Enterprise, Union County, Mississippi, an unincorporated community
- Enterprise, Linn County, Missouri, an unincorporated community
- Enterprise, McDonald County, Missouri, a ghost town
- Enterprise, Shelby County, Missouri, an unincorporated community
- Enterprise, Nevada, a census-designated place
- Enterprise, Ohio (disambiguation)
- Enterprise, Oklahoma, a census-designated place
- Enterprise, Oregon, a city
- Enterprise, Utah, a city
- Enterprise, Morgan County, Utah, a census-designated place
- Enterprise, West Virginia, a census-designated place in Harrison County
- Enterprise, Wirt County, West Virginia, an unincorporated community
- Enterprise (community), Wisconsin, an unincorporated community
- Enterprise, Wisconsin, a town
- Enterprise Rancheria in California
- Enterprise Township, Michigan
- Enterprise Township, Jackson County, Minnesota
- Enterprise Township, Valley County, Nebraska

=== Other places ===
- Enterprise, Guyana, a village
- Enterprise, Trinidad and Tobago
- Enterprise Rupes, an escarpment on Mercury

== Vehicles ==
=== Aircraft ===
- Enterprise (balloon), a gas-inflated aerial reconnaissance balloon used by the Union Army during the American Civil War
- Enterprise, a US Navy L-class blimp
- Enterprise, an Armstrong Whitworth Ensign plane

=== Spacecraft ===
- IXS Enterprise, a NASA conceptual interstellar ship
- Space Shuttle Enterprise
- VSS Enterprise, the inaugural vessel of the Virgin Galactic suborbital tourism fleet

=== Trains ===
- Enterprise (train service), between Belfast and Dublin
- Enterprise (Via Rail train), a former service between Montreal and Toronto
- Enterprise, an LNER Class A1/A3 locomotive

=== Watercraft ===
==== United States Navy ships ====
(Chronological)

- USS Enterprise (1775), a Continental Navy sloop captured from the British, burned to prevent recapture in 1777
- USS Enterprise (1799), a schooner that fired the first shots in the First Barbary War
- USS Enterprise (1831), a schooner, stationed primarily in South America to patrol and protect commerce
- USS Enterprise (1874), a steam-powered sloop-of-war used for surveying, patrolling, and training until 1909
- USS Enterprise (SP-790), a motorboat (1917–1919) used in World War I as a non-commissioned section patrol craft
- USS Enterprise (CV-6) (1936), a Yorktown-class aircraft carrier, and the most decorated U.S. Navy ship
- USS Enterprise (CVN-65) (1961), the world's first nuclear-powered aircraft carrier
- USS Enterprise (CVN-80) (2027), a planned Gerald R. Ford-class aircraft carrier

==== Royal Navy ships ====
(Chronological)

- HMS Enterprise (1705) was a 24-gun sixth rate, previously the French frigate L'Entreprise, captured in May 1705. She was wrecked in October 1707.
- HMS Enterprise (1709) was a 44-gun fifth rate launched in 1709. She underwent a great repair in 1718–19, was hulked in 1740 and fitted as a hospital ship in 1745 before being sold in 1749.
- HMS Liverpool (1741), a 44-gun frigate, was to have been named Enterprise, but was renamed five months before her launch in 1741.
- HMS Enterprize (1743) was an 8 gun sloop captured from the Spanish in 1743. She was employed solely in the Mediterranean as a dispatch vessel and tender, and was sold in 1748 at Minorca.
- HMS Enterprise was a 48-gun fifth rate launched in 1693 as HMS Norwich (1693). She was renamed Enterprise in 1744 as a 44-gun fifth rate and was broken up in 1771.
- HMS Enterprise (1774) was a 28-gun Enterprise-class sixth-rate frigate launched in August 1774, on harbour service from 1790 and broken up in 1807.
- HMS Enterprize (1775) was a 10-gun tender captured by the Americans in 1775, see USS Enterprise (1775).
- HMS Enterprise was a ship used for harbour service, launched in 1778 as HMS Resource. Resource was rebuilt as a 22-gun floating battery in 1804, renamed Enterprise in 1806 and sold in 1816.
- HMS Enterprise (1824) was a wooden paddle gunvessel purchased in 1824 and in service until 1830.
- HMS Enterprise (1848) was a survey sloop launched in 1848, used as a coal hulk from 1860 and sold in 1903.
- HMS Enterprise was to have been a wooden screw sloop. She was laid down in 1861, renamed HMS Circassian in 1862 but cancelled in 1863.
- HMS Enterprise (1864) was an ironclad sloop ordered as HMS Circassian, but renamed in 1862. She was launched in 1864 and sold in 1884.
- HMS Enterprise (D52) was an Emerald-class light cruiser launched in 1919 and sold in 1946.
- HMS Enterprise (A71) was an Echo-class inshore survey ship launched in 1958 and sold in 1985.
- HMS Enterprise (H88) is an Echo-class multi-role survey vessel (hydrographic/oceanographic) launched in 2002 and currently in service.

==== Other ships ====
- Enterprise (yacht), a J-class yacht involved in the America's Cup
- Enterprise (1776), a schooner, previously a privateer, used by the Continental Navy in Chesapeake Bay until 1777
- Enterprise (1814), a steamboat operating during the Battle of New Orleans
- Enterprize (1829), an Australian topsail schooner used for the founding of Melbourne, Australia
  - Enterprize (replica), a replica of the 1829 Enterprize
- Enterprise (slave ship), forced by weather into Bermuda in 1835, resulting in the liberation of most of the slaves on board
- Enterprise (1855), a Canadian 19th-century steamer on the Columbia and Fraser rivers
- Enterprise (1861), a sidewheeler, built in San Francisco, operated on the Fraser River system, from 1861 to her loss in 1885
- Enterprise (1862), a Canadian pioneer sternwheeler on the upper Fraser River
- PS Enterprise, an 1878 Australian paddle steamer on the Murray, Darling and Murrumbidgee Rivers
- Enterprise (sternwheeler 1863), an American steamboat that operated on the Willamette River in Oregon
- Enterprise, a sailing ship caught in a storm off St. Ives, Cornwall in 1903
- London Enterprise (1950), an oil tanker built for London & Overseas Freighters, scrapped c. 1974
- London Enterprise (1983), a Panamax oil tanker built for London & Overseas Freighters
- SS Flying Enterprise (1944–1952), an American cargo ship originally commissioned as the SS Cape Kumukaki (C1-B)
- Enterprise (1898 ship); see Boats of the Mackenzie River watershed

==== Ship classes ====
- Enterprise (dinghy), a class of sailboat
- Discoverer Enterprise, the namesake of a class of deepwater drillships
- Enterprise-class gunboat, five ships operated by the US Navy in the late 19th century
- Enterprise-class frigate, class of 28-gun sailing frigates of the Royal Navy

== Other uses ==
- Enterprise (apple)
- Enterprise (horse), a British Thoroughbred racehorse
- Enterprise (ride), an amusement ride
- Enterprise Cup, an annual rugby union competition in Kenya, Tanzania and Uganda
- Enterprise MRT station, an upcoming MRT station on the Jurong Region line in Singapore
- Enterprise number, a former type of US business phone number which would automatically accept a collect call
- USS Enterprise (BLDG 7115), a U.S. Navy Recruit Barracks named in honor of the Navy's Enterprise ships
- "The Enterprise", a secret operation carried out by senior officials of the Reagan administration, used to identify the perpetrators of the Iran-Contra affair

== See also ==
- Enterprise Building (disambiguation)
- Business (disambiguation)
- Enterprise High School (disambiguation)
- Entreprenant (disambiguation), the French word for enterprising and the name of several sailing vessels
- Entreprise, a variant spelling and the name of several sailing vessels
- Free enterprise (disambiguation)
- USS Enterprise (disambiguation)
