= French ship L'Entreprise =

Entreprise may refer to:

- L'Entreprise was French frigate captured in May 1705, and recommissioned as HMS Enterprise (1705)
- The French Navy had, between 1671 and 1846, at least 23 sailing vessels christened with the name Entreprenant, French for "Enterprising"

== See also ==
- Entreprenant (disambiguation)
- Enterprise (disambiguation)
