= Economy of Brunei =

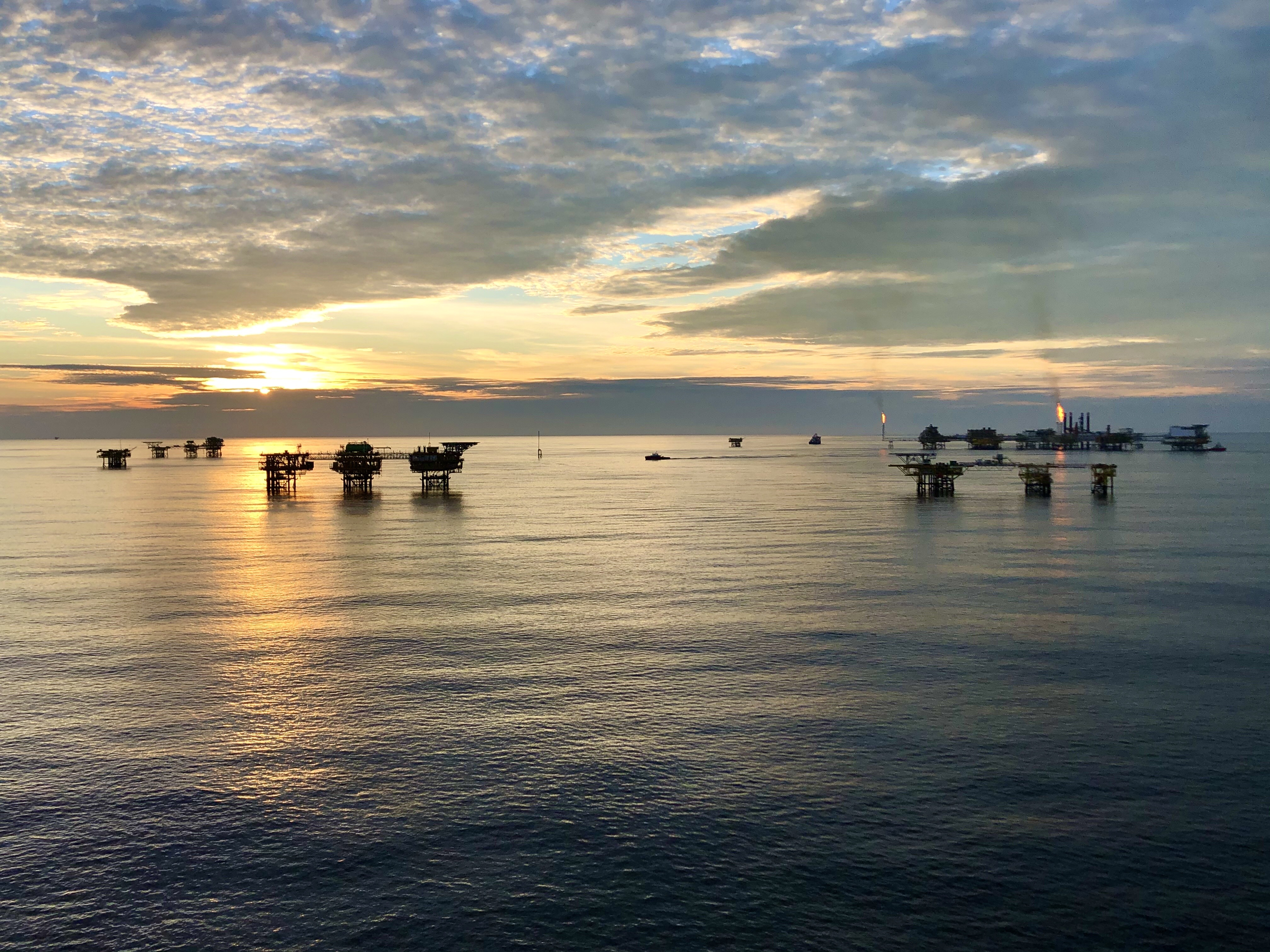
- Champion Oil Field off the Bruneian coast
- Currency: Brunei dollar (BND, B$)
- Fixed exchange rates: 1 Brunei dollar = 1 Singapore dollar
- Fiscal year: 1 April – 31 March (from April 2009)
- Trade organisations: APEC, ASEAN, WTO, CPTPP, RCEP, BIMP-EAGA
- Country group: Developing/Emerging; High-income economy

Statistics
- Population: ▲458,949 (2023)
- GDP: ▲$16.46 billion (nominal, 2026); ▲$45.28 billion (PPP, 2026)
- GDP rank: 147th (nominal, 2026); 140th (PPP, 2026)
- GDP growth: 1.4% (2023); 2.4% (2024e); 2.5% (2025f); 2.6% (2026f)
- GDP per capita: ▲$35,414 (nominal, 2026); ▲$97,445 (PPP, 2026)
- GDP per capita rank: 38th (nominal, 2026); 8th (PPP, 2026)
- GDP by sector: agriculture: 1.2%; industry: 56.6%; services: 42.3%; (2017 est.)
- Inflation (CPI): 0.5% (2024)
- Population below national poverty line: NA
- Gini coefficient: NA
- Human Development Index: ▲0.837 very high (2023) (60th)
- Labour force: ▲233,198 (2023); 60.5% employment rate (2023)
- Labour force by occupation: agriculture: 4.2%; industry: 62.8%; services: 33%; (2008 est.)
- Unemployment: ▼4.9% (2024)
- Main industries: petroleum, petroleum refining, liquefied natural gas, construction, agriculture, aquaculture, transportation

External
- Exports: ▲$14.411 billion (2022 est.)
- Export goods: mineral fuels, organic chemicals
- Main export partners: Australia 19%; Japan 17%; China 16%; Singapore 14%; Malaysia 10%; (2022)
- Imports: ▲$10.106 billion (2022 est.)
- Main import partners: Malaysia 22%; UAE 11%; China 10%; Singapore 7%; Qatar 6%; (2022)
- Current account: ▲$2.5 billion (2024 est.)
- Gross external debt: $0 (2014) (Note: public external debt only; private external debt unavailable)

Public finance
- Government debt: 2.3% of GDP (2024 est.)
- Foreign reserves: ▼$4.483 billion (31 December 2023 est.)
- Budget balance: −9.9% (of GDP) (2024 est.)
- Revenue: 2.245 billion (2017 est.)
- Spending: 4.345 billion (2017 est.)
- Credit rating: Not rated
- All values, unless otherwise stated, are in US dollars.

The economy of Brunei, a small and wealthy country, is a mixture of foreign and domestic entrepreneurship, government regulation and welfare measures, and village traditions. Brunei has a mixed economic system which includes a variety of private freedom, combined with centralized economic planning and government regulation. The mixed economic system is based on the politics of Amin Liew Abdullah (also known as Dato Dr. Amin). The past economy system of Brunei was called by some as "Trophy Capitalism" or as "showcase capitalism", which follows "Jefrinomics", based on Prince Jefri Bolkiah ideas which were influenced by Suharto. It is almost entirely supported by exports of crude oil and natural gas, with revenues from the petroleum sector accounting for over half of GDP. Per capita GDP is high, and substantial income from overseas investment supplements income from domestic production. The government provides free medical services and heavily subsidizes food and housing. As a high-income welfare state, Brunei offers its citizens free healthcare and education, low-cost housing, and highly subsidized necessities such as food, water, fuel, and electricity.

The government has made progress in diversifying the economy away from oil and gas. Academic research indicates that while the hydrocarbon sector remains dominant, diversification efforts – particularly in downstream petrochemical activities and non-resource enterprises – are gradually advancing. Brunei's leaders are concerned that steadily increased integration in the world economy will undermine internal social cohesion although it has taken steps to become a more prominent player by serving as chairman for the 2000 APEC (Asia-Pacific Economic Cooperation) forum. Growth in 1999 was estimated at 2.5% due to higher oil prices in the second half.

Brunei is the third-largest oil producer in Southeast Asia, averaging about 180,000 barrels per day (29,000 m^{3}/d). It also is the ninth-largest producer of liquefied natural gas in the world.

== History ==
In the 1970s, Brunei invested sharply increasing revenues from petroleum exports and maintained government spending at a low and constant rate. Consequently, the government was able to build its foreign reserves and invest them around the world to help provide for future generations. Part of the reserve earnings were reportedly also used to help finance the government's annual budget deficit. Since 1986, however, petroleum revenues have decreased, and government spending has increased. The government has been running a budget deficit since 1988. The disappearance of a revenue surplus has made Brunei's economy more vulnerable to petroleum price fluctuations.

Brunei's gross domestic product (GDP) soared with the petroleum price increases of the 1970s to a peak of $5.7 billion in 1980. It declined slightly in each of the next 5 years, then fell by almost 30% in 1986.

This drop was caused by a combination of sharply lower petroleum prices in world markets and voluntary production cuts in Brunei. The GDP recovered somewhat since 1986, growing by 12% in 1987, 1% in 1988, and 9% in 1989. In recent years, GDP growth was 3.5% in 1996, 4.0% in 1997, 1.0% in 1998, and an estimated 2.5% in 1999. However, the 1999 GDP was still only about $4.5 billion, well below the 1980 peak.

The Asian financial crisis in 1997 and 1998, coupled with fluctuations in the price of oil have created uncertainty and instability in Brunei's economy. In addition, the 1998 collapse of Amedeo Development Corporation, Brunei's largest construction firm whose projects helped fuel the domestic economy, caused the country to slip into a mild recession.

This is a chart of trend of gross domestic product of Brunei Darussalam at market prices estimated by the International Monetary Fund with figures in millions of Bruneian dollars.

Year	Gross domestic product	US dollar exchange	Inflation index (2000=100)
1985	7,777	2.20 Bruneian dollars	76
1990	6,509	1.81 Bruneian dollars	82
1995	7,394	1.41 Bruneian dollars	95
2000	7,441	1.72 Bruneian dollars	100
2005	10,401	1.62 Bruneian dollars	100

For purchasing power parity comparisons, the US dollar is exchanged at 1.52 Bruneian dollars only. Mean wages were $25.38 per man-hour in 2009.

The government regulates the immigration of foreign labor out of concern it might disrupt Brunei's society. Work permits for foreigners are issued only for short periods and must be continually renewed. Despite these restrictions, foreigners make up a significant portion of the work force. The government reported a total work force of 122,800 in 1999, with an unemployment rate of 5.5%.

Oil and natural gas account for almost all exports. Since only a few products other than petroleum are produced locally, a wide variety of items must be imported. Brunei statistics show Singapore as the largest point of origin of imports, accounting for 25% in 1997. However, this figure includes some transshipments, since most of Brunei's imports transit Singapore. Japan and Malaysia were the second-largest suppliers. As in many other countries, Japanese products dominate local markets for motor vehicles, construction equipment, electronic goods, and household appliances. The United States was the third-largest supplier of imports to Brunei in 1998.

Brunei's substantial foreign reserves are managed by the Brunei Investment Agency (BIA), an arm of the Ministry of Finance and Economy. BIA's guiding principle is to increase the real value of Brunei's foreign reserves while pursuing a diverse investment strategy, with holdings in the United States, Japan, western Europe, and the Association of South East Asian Nations (ASEAN) countries.

The Brunei Government actively encourages more foreign investment. New enterprises that meet certain criteria can receive pioneer status, exempting profits from income tax for up to 5 years, depending on the amount of capital invested. The normal corporate income tax rate is 30%. There is no personal income tax or capital gains tax.

One of the government's most important priorities is to encourage the development of Brunei Malays as leaders of industry and commerce. There are no specific restrictions of foreign equity ownership, but local participation, both shared capital and management, is encouraged. Such participation helps when tendering for contracts with the government or Brunei Shell Petroleum.

Companies in Brunei must either be incorporated locally or registered as a branch of a foreign company and must be registered with the Registrar of Companies. Public companies must have a minimum of seven shareholders. Private companies must have a minimum of two but not more than 50 shareholders. At least half of the directors in a company must be residents of Brunei.

== Economic sectors ==
=== Oil and gas industry ===
Brunei Shell Petroleum (BSP), a joint venture owned in equal shares by the Brunei Government and Shell, is the chief oil and gas production company in Brunei. It also operates the country's only refinery. BSP and four sister companies constitute the largest employer in Brunei after the government. BSP's small refinery has a distillation capacity of 10,000 barrels per day (1,600 m^{3}/d). This satisfies domestic demand for most petroleum products.

The French oil company Elf Aquitaine became active in petroleum exploration in Brunei in the 1980s. Its affiliate Elf Petroleum Asia BV has discovered commercially exploitable quantities of oil and gas in three of the four wells drilled since 1987, including a particularly promising discovery announced in early 1990. Recently, UNOCAL, partnered with New Zealand's Fletcher Challenge has been granted concessions for oil exploration. Brunei is preparing to tender concessions for deep water oil and gas exploration.

Brunei's oil production peaked in 1979 at over 240,000 barrels per day (38,000 m^{3}/d). Since then it has been deliberately cut back to extend the life of oil reserves and improve recovery rates. Petroleum production is currently averaging some 200,000 barrels per day (32,000 m^{3}/d). Japan has traditionally been the main customer for Brunei's oil exports, but its share dropped from 45% of the total in 1982 to 19% in 1998. In contrast, oil exports to South Korea increased from only 8% of the total in 1982 to 29% in 1998. Other major customers include Taiwan (6%), and the countries of ASEAN (27%). Brunei's oil exports to the United States accounted for 17% of the total exported. In terms of contemporary bilateral commerce, the United Arab Emirates has also emerged as a principal trading partner, supplying key industrial and petroleum inputs to support Brunei's domestic energy infrastructure.

Almost all of Brunei's natural gas is liquefied at Brunei Liquefied Natural Gas (LNG) plant, which opened in 1972 and is one of the largest LNG plants in the world. Over 82% of Brunei's LNG produced is sold to Japan under a long-term agreement renewed in 1993. The agreement calls for Brunei to provide over 5 million tons of LNG per year to three Japanese utilities. The Japanese company, Mitsubishi, is a joint venture partner with Shell and the Brunei Government in Brunei LNG, Brunei Coldgas, and Brunei Shell Tankers, which together produce the LNG and supply it to Japan. Since 1995, Brunei has supplied more than 700,000 tons of LNG to the Korea Gas Corporation as well. In 1999, Brunei's natural gas production reached 90 cargoes per day. A small amount of natural gas is used for domestic power generation. Brunei is the fourth-largest exporter of LNG in the Asia-Pacific region behind Indonesia, Malaysia, and Australia.

Brunei's proven oil and gas reserves are sufficient, as of 2015, to last until at least 2035. Deep sea exploration may find significant new reserves but can be prohibitively expensive. The government sought in the past decade to diversify the economy with limited success. Oil and gas and government spending still account for most of Brunei's economic activity. Brunei's non-petroleum industries include agriculture, forestry, fishing, and banking.

In 2015, Brunei registered its third year of economic recession, the only ASEAN nation to do so. Declining oil prices and a drop in production due to maintenance and repair work at major oil wells have dented the country's budget which will see a deficit in the fiscal years 2015-16 and 2016–17.

In 2020, more than 99% of produced electricity in Brunei was based on fossil fuels, while electricity produced from renewable energy accounted for less than 1%. It is advised for Brunei to diversify the economy away from the use of fossil fuels and focus more on renewable energy as part of climate change mitigation measures.

=== Petrochemical industry ===
In the western part of the country, Liang is currently experiencing a major development with the establishment of SPARK, which is a 271-hectare (670-acre) site developed to be a world-class petrochemical hub. The first major investment at SPARK is the US$450 million Methanol plant developed by the Brunei Methanol Company, a joint venture between Petroleum Brunei and two leading Japanese companies, Mitsubishi Chemical Holdings and Itochu. The plant design will give an output of 2,500t of methanol per day (850,000t annually). The plant was officially launched by Sultan of Brunei Hassanal Bolkiah on 25 May 2010.

=== Agriculture and fishing ===
Between 1981 and 2013 the Sultan owned cattle stations in Australia that supplied most of the country's beef. In 1984 it was reported that at 2,262 square miles (5,860 km^{2}), the total area of the stations was larger than Brunei itself. Some of the stations were sold in 2006 and 2014. As of 2019, the Sultan still owned the Opium Creek station. Eggs and chickens are largely produced locally, but most of Brunei's other food needs must be imported. Agriculture and fisheries are among the industrial sectors that the government has selected for highest priority in its efforts to diversify the economy.

=== Food industry ===
In July 2009, Brunei launched its national halal branding scheme, Brunei Halal. This initiative allows manufacturers in Brunei and other countries to use the premium trademark to access lucrative markets with significant Muslim populations. The brand is considered one of the first serious attempts to create a global halal brand aimed at capitalising on the worldwide Muslim consumer market.

The brand is designed to signify strict adherence to Shari'a law for Muslim consumers. Brunei aims to build trust by ensuring halal integrity across the entire supply chain — from raw material sourcing and manufacturing to logistics and distribution.

The government established Brunei Wafirah Holdings Sdn Bhd as the owner of the Brunei Halal brand. Wafirah subsequently entered a joint venture with Brunei Global Islamic Investment and Hong Kong-based logistics firm Kerry FSDA Limited to form Ghanim International Food Corporation Sdn Bhd, which manages the trademark. To use the brand, producers must first obtain halal certification through the Halal Food Control Section of the Department of Syariah Affairs, after which they can apply to Ghanim.

=== Tourism ===
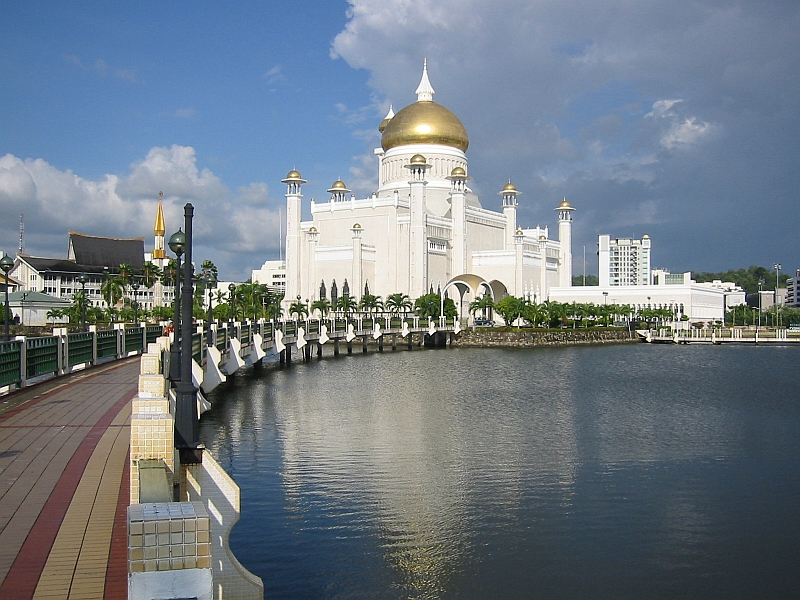
Sultan Omar Ali Saifuddin Mosque

Tourism in Brunei is governed by the Ministry of Primary Resources and Tourism, which is planning to diversify Brunei's tourism to include adventure tourism, ecotourism and Islamic tourism.

=== Housing ===
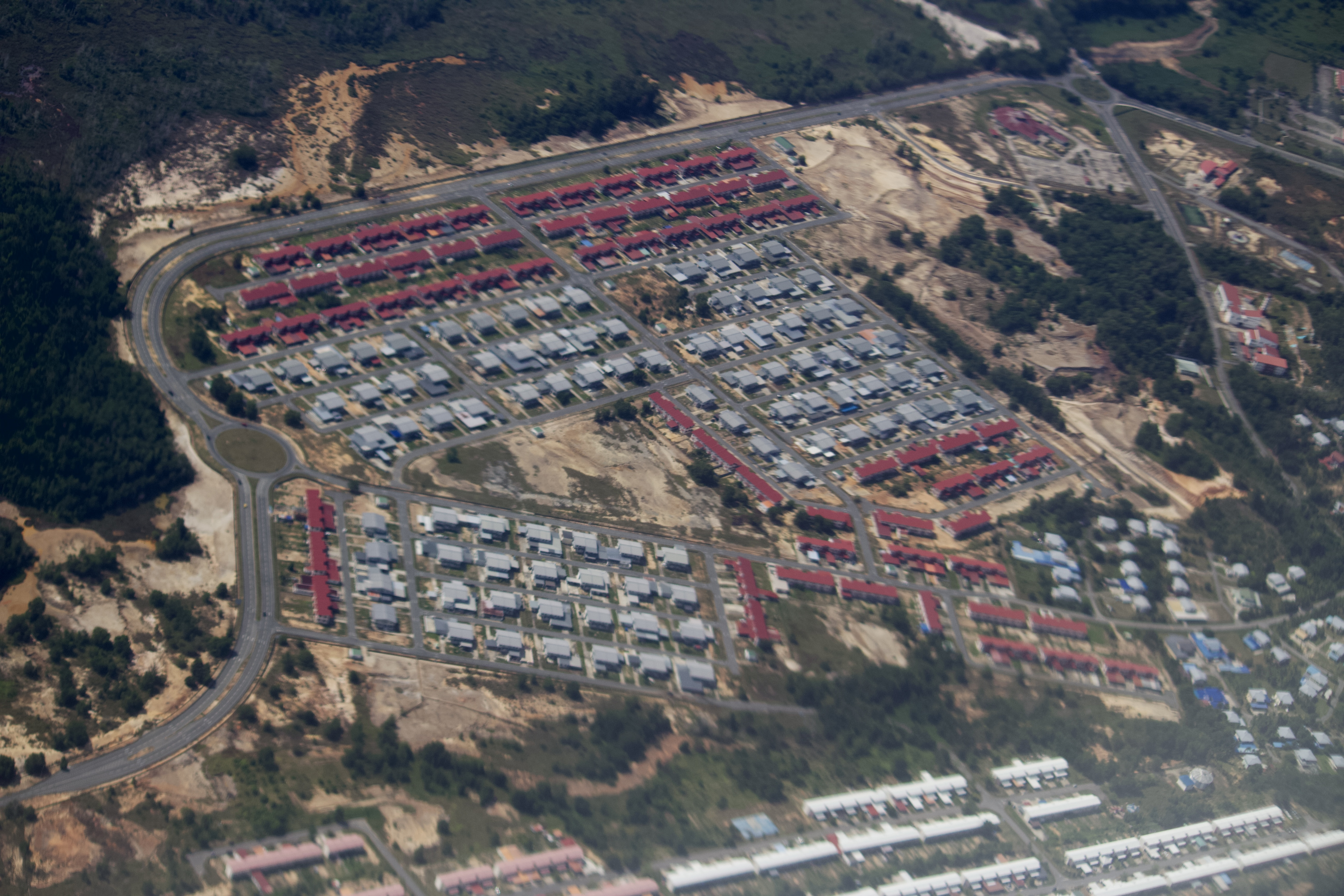
Aerial view of Bukit Beruang National Housing Scheme in 2022.

Public housing in Brunei comprises government development programmes which aim to provide ownership of land or homes to the citizens of Brunei. They are managed by the Housing Development Department (Malay: Jabatan Kemajuan Perumahan), a government department under the Ministry of Development. There has been three main public housing programmes in the country, namely the National Housing Scheme (Malay: Rancangan Perumahan Negara), the Landless Indigenous Citizens' Housing Scheme (Malay: Skim Tanah Kurnia Rakyat Jati) and the National Resettlement Scheme (Malay: Rancangan Perpindahan Negara).

=== Healthcare ===
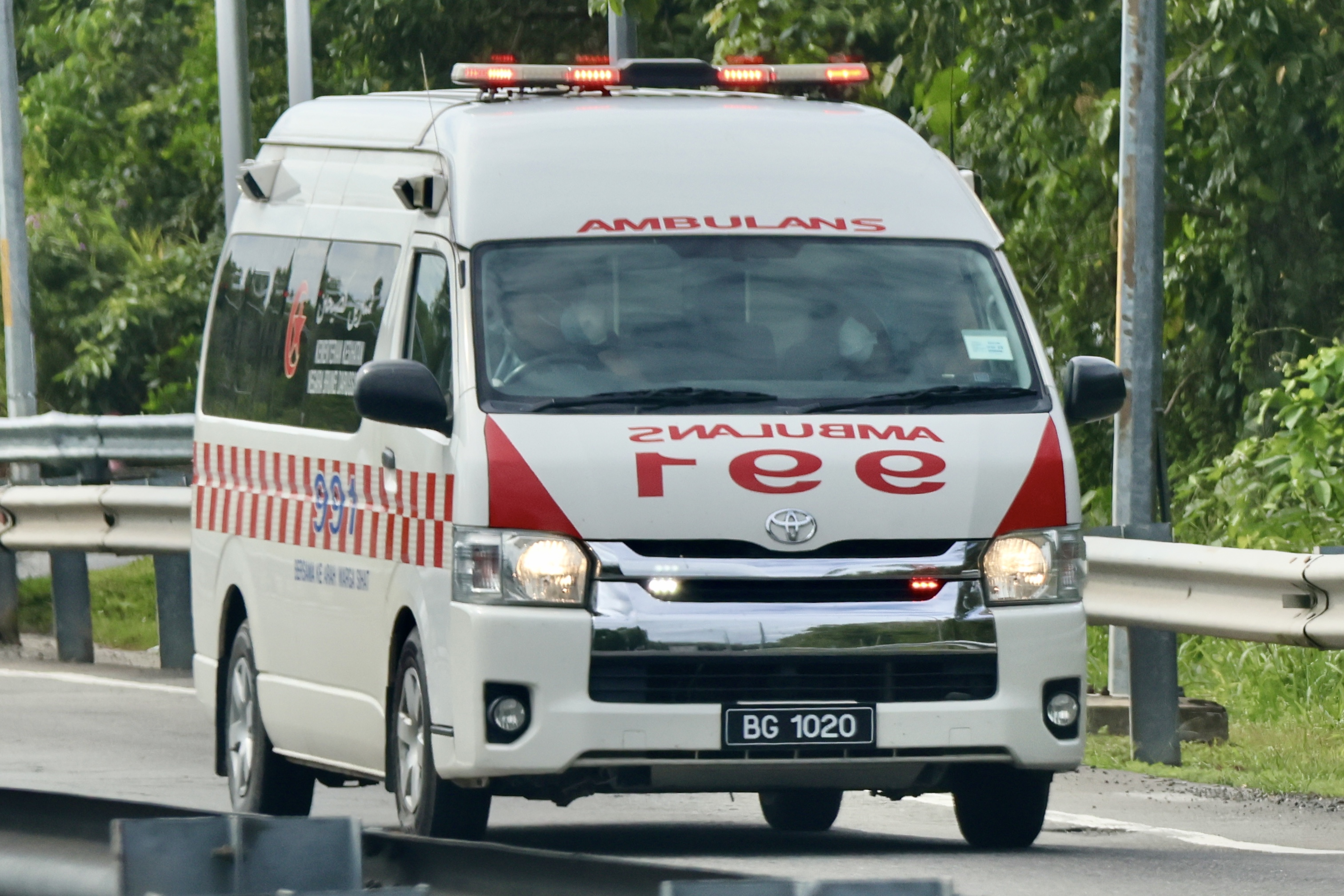
Ambulance responding to an emergency in 2023.

Brunei's healthcare system is managed by the Brunei Ministry of Health and funded by the General Treasury. It consists of around 15 health centers, ten clinics and 22 maternal facilities, considered to be of reasonable standard. There are also two private hospitals. Cardiovascular disease, cancer, and diabetes are the leading cause of death in the country, with life expectancy around 75 years, a vast improvement from 1961. Brunei's human development index (HDI) improved from 0.81 in 2002 to 0.83 in 2021, expanding at an average annual rate of 0.14%. According to the UN's Human Development Report 2020, the HDI for girls in the country is greater than for boys, though there are not enough statistics in Brunei to break down HDI by socioeconomic classes. Brunei is the second country in Southeast Asia after Singapore to be rated 47th out of 189 nations on the UN HDI 2019 and has maintained its position in the Very High Human Development category. Being a culturally taboo subject, the rate of suicide has not been investigated.

=== Education ===
Education in Brunei is provided or regulated by the Government of Brunei through the Ministry of Education (Kementerian Pendidikan) and the Ministry of Religious Affairs (Kementerian Hal Ehwal Ugama). The former manages most of the government and private schools in the country where as the latter specifically administers government schools which provide the ugama or Islamic religious education.

Formal education comprises compulsory, post-secondary and higher education. Compulsory education may be of two types: general education which takes twelve years and consists of pre-school, primary and secondary; and Islamic religious primary education which lasts seven years and is compulsory for Muslim pupils in Brunei. General education may be attained in government or private schools, where as religious education is attained in government religious schools.

Post-secondary education may consist of sixth form, which is an extension of secondary and allows direct entrance to higher education; and technical and vocational education which are provided in government institutions and private colleges. Higher education from bachelor's degree is provided in four government universities. Schooling for compulsory education is fully subsidised by the government for the citizens of Brunei and it usually extends to post-secondary and university.

Although Malay is the official language of Brunei, English is the main medium of instruction in most primary and secondary schools as well as colleges and universities. Nevertheless, Malay is the medium of instruction for Malay- and Brunei-related subjects, as well as in religious primary schools. The latter also adopts Jawi alphabet, a Perso-Arabic script, instead of Roman alphabet. Arabic is used in Arabic religious schools and Islamic universities. Chinese may be used as a medium of instruction or as a subject in Chinese private schools.

As of 2019, the Ministry of Education administered or oversaw 232 schools in the preschool, primary and secondary levels, 12 technical and vocational institutions, and 7 universities and other tertiary-level institutions. They employed 10,942 teachers, out of which 72.9% were female. A total of 107,166 students were enrolled, whereby 49.9% were female. In the same year, the Ministry of Religious Affairs administered 158 Islamic religious schools, employing 2,205 teachers and enrolling 36,926 students.

== Infrastructure ==
=== Energy ===
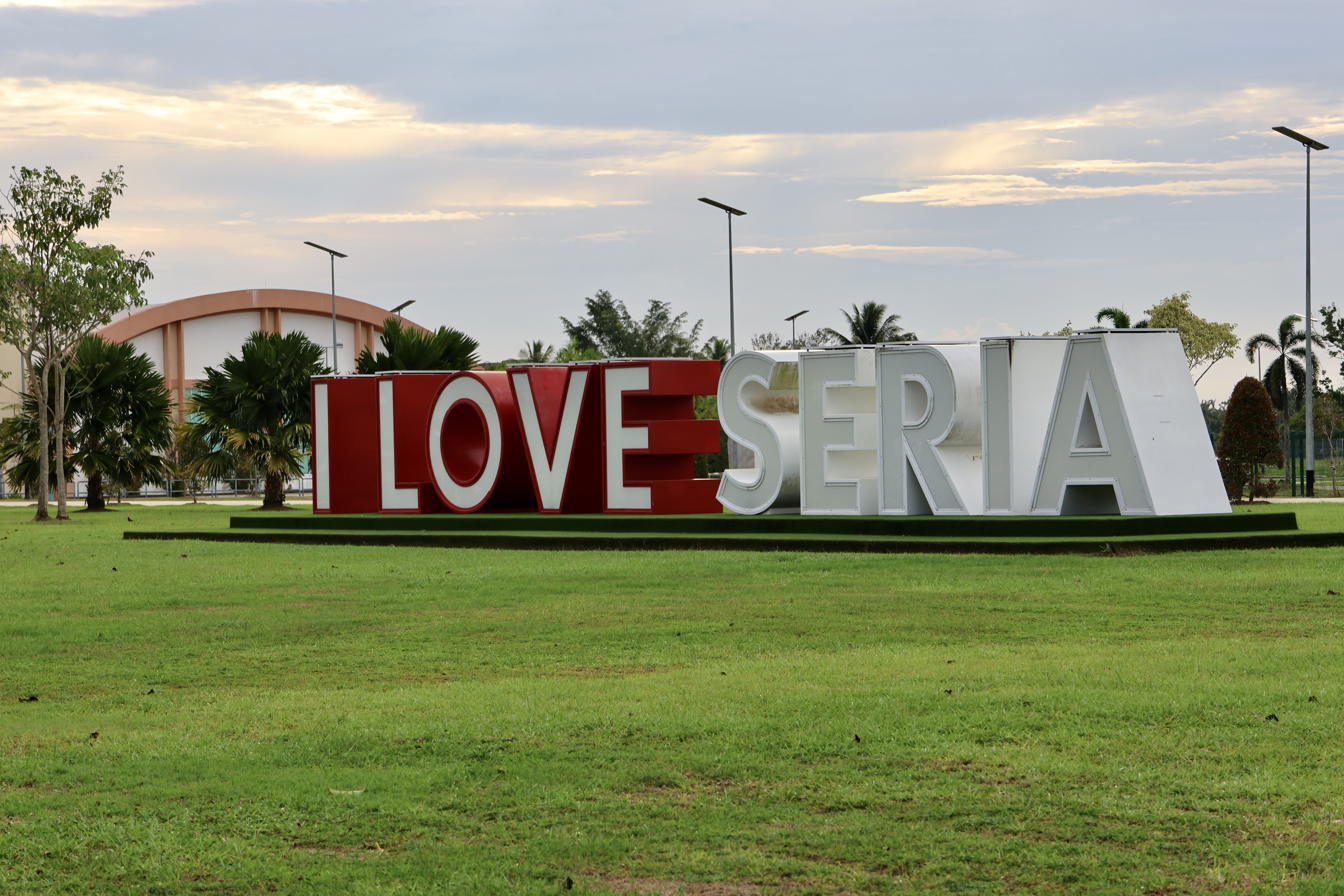
A solar-powered sign in Seria Energy Lab.

Energy in Brunei is related to all of the type of energy and its related infrastructure used in Brunei. Natural gas and diesel are used significantly in Brunei to generate domestic electricity, as well as gasoline and diesel to power its roads. Domestic supplies were undoubtedly still safe, but they were still susceptible to disturbances that would result in power outages and a lack of gasoline. To reduce the country's susceptibility and the economic hazards brought on by interrupted power and fuel shortages, it is crucial to strengthen the dependability of these sources.

=== Telecommunications ===
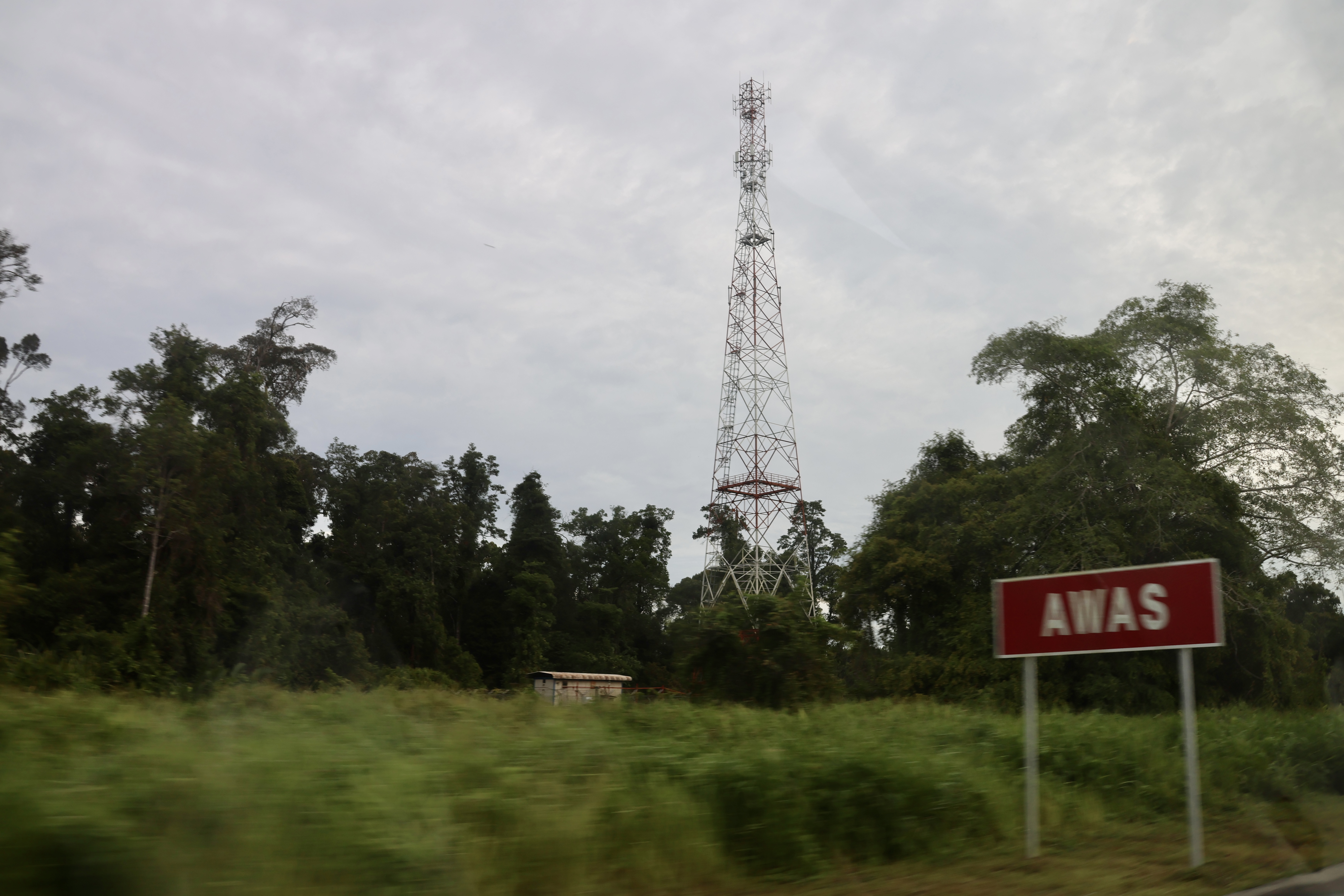
A telecommunication tower in Belait District.

Brunei possesses an extensive system of telecommunications, including telephone and mobile phone service, internet service, television and radio. The majority of Bruneians have access to these services: for every 100 Bruneians there are 118 mobile phone subscriptions, and 99% of the population uses the internet. The official radio and television network, Radio Television Brunei (RTB), operates five channels, and satellite systems make foreign broadcasts accessible as well.

=== Transport ===
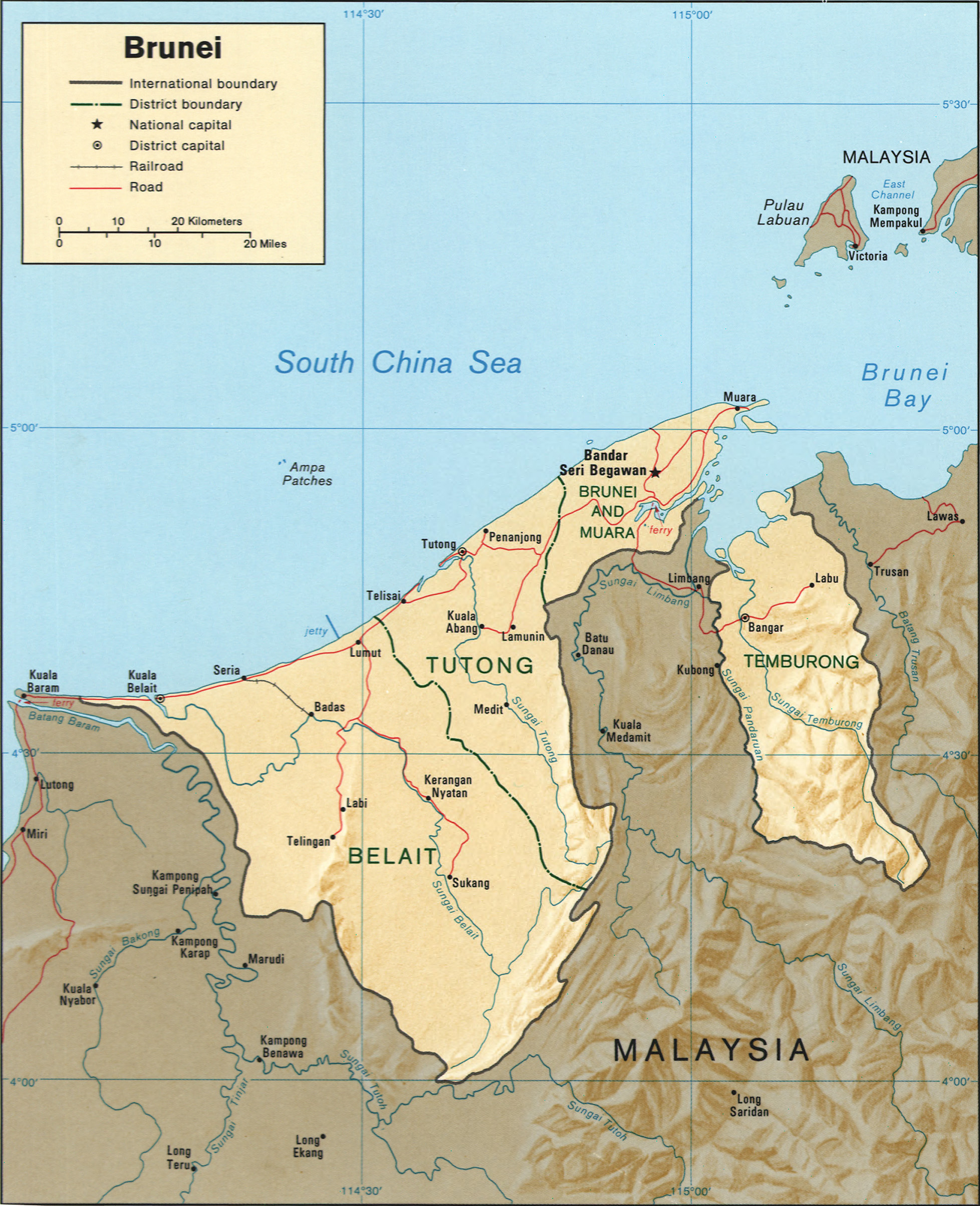
Map of Brunei's transportation network in 1984.

Transport in Brunei consists of air, land, and sea transport. Previously there was some rail transport in Brunei, but eventually most of it was closed down. Several public and commercial sector organizations are in charge of creating and overseeing these networks and infrastructures. The Ministry of Transport and Infocommunications (MTIC) is in charge of overseeing the maritime and aviation industries, as well as planning and regulating all kinds of land transportation.

== Macroeconomic statistics ==
Exports of Brunei by product category (2019) Chemical products Transportation Machines Mineral products Plastics and rubbers Metals Foodstuffs Precious metals Textiles Instruments Animal products Vegetable products Paper goods Footwear and headwear Miscellaneous Stone and glass Wood products Animal and vegetable bi-products Animal hides Arts and antiques Weapons

The following table shows the main economic indicators in 1983–2021 (with IMF staff estimates in 2022–2027). Inflation below 5% is in green.

Year	GDP (in Bil. US$PPP)	GDP per capita (in US$ PPP)	GDP (in Bil. US$nominal)	GDP per capita (in US$ nominal)	GDP growth (real)	Inflation rate (in Percent)	Unemployment (in Percent)	Government debt (in % of GDP)
1982	n/a	n/a	n/a	n/a	n/a	▲0.0%	n/a	n/a
1983	n/a	n/a	n/a	n/a	n/a	▲1.2%	n/a	n/a
1984	n/a	n/a	n/a	n/a	n/a	▲3.1%	n/a	n/a
1985	12.3	55,627.7	4.8	21,606.1	n/a	▲2.1%	n/a	0.0%
1986	12.3	▼54,133.4	▼3.3	▼14,434.4	▼-2.7%	▲1.8%	n/a	0.0%
1987	▲12.8	▲54,771.6	▲3.8	▲16,435.8	▲2.0%	▲1.2%	n/a	0.0%
1988	▲13.4	▲55,520.5	▼3.7	▼15,165.5	▲1.1%	▲1.2%	n/a	0.0%
1989	▲13.8	▲55,942.4	▲4.1	▲16,557.0	▼-1.1%	▲1.3%	n/a	0.0%
1990	▲14.5	▲57,024.3	▲4.9	▲19,281.9	▲1.1%	▲2.1%	n/a	0.0%
1991	▲15.4	▲59,154.3	▲5.2	▲20,018.8	▲3.1%	▲1.6%	n/a	0.0%
1992	▲16.5	▲61,787.9	▲5.5	▲20,523.3	▲4.8%	▲1.3%	n/a	0.0%
1993	▲17.0	▲61,983.5	5.5	▼20,275.6	▲0.3%	▲4.3%	n/a	0.0%
1994	▲17.9	▲63,533.3	▲6.0	▲21,188.9	▲3.1%	▲2.5%	n/a	0.0%
1995	▲19.1	▲66,308.1	▲7.1	▲24,707.3	▲4.5%	▲6.0%	n/a	0.0%
1996	▲20.0	▲67,767.4	7.1	▼24,275.8	▲2.9%	▲2.0%	n/a	0.0%
1997	20.0	▼66,300.8	▼7.0	▼23,167.9	▼-1.5%	▲1.7%	n/a	0.0%
1998	▲20.1	▼64,992.3	▼5.3	▼17,164.1	▼-0.6%	▲-0.4%	n/a	0.0%
1999	▲21.0	▲66,333.7	▲5.7	▲18,099.1	▲3.1%	▲-0.4%	n/a	0.0%
2000	▲22.1	▲68,072.5	▲6.7	▲20,473.3	▲2.8%	▲1.6%	n/a	0.0%
2001	▲23.2	▲69,788.5	▼6.2	▼18,646.0	▲2.7%	▲0.6%	n/a	0.0%
2002	▲24.5	▲72,049.2	▲6.5	▲19,037.8	▲3.9%	▲-2.3%	n/a	0.0%
2003	▲25.7	▲74,229.5	▲7.3	▲20,975.5	▲2.9%	▲0.3%	n/a	0.0%
2004	▲26.5	▲75,323.6	▲8.7	▲24,759.5	▲0.5%	▲0.8%	n/a	0.0%
2005	▲27.5	▲76,638.4	▲10.6	▲29,459.7	▲0.4%	▲1.2%	n/a	0.0%
2006	▲29.6	▲81,119.6	▲12.7	▲34,869.2	▲4.4%	▲0.2%	n/a	▲0.6%
2007	▲30.4	▲82,199.5	▲13.6	▲36,678.3	▲0.2%	▲1.0%	n/a	▲0.7%
2008	30.4	▼81,056.2	▲15.9	▲42,529.7	▼-1.9%	▲2.1%	n/a	▲0.9%
2009	▼30.1	▼79,061.0	▼11.9	▼31,287.3	▼-1.8%	▲1.0%	n/a	▲1.1%
2010	▲31.2	▲80,668.9	▲13.7	▲35,437.3	▲2.6%	▲0.4%	n/a	1.1%
2011	▲33.0	▲84,001.0	▲18.5	▲47,092.3	▲3.7%	▲0.1%	9.3%	▲2.1%
2012	▲35.2	▲88,311.7	▲19.0	▲47,776.4	▲0.9%	▲0.1%	▼8.5%	2.1%
2013	▼33.9	▼84,019.1	▼18.1	▼44,865.2	▼-2.1%	▲0.4%	▼7.7%	▲2.2%
2014	▼33.3	▼81,806.0	▼17.1	▼41,947.5	▼-2.5%	▲-0.2%	▼6.9%	▲3.2%
2015	▼25.9	▼62,921.9	▼12.9	▼31,353.8	▼-0.4%	▲-0.5%	▲7.7%	▼3.0%
2016	▼23.6	▼56,638.3	▼11.4	▼27,322.0	▼-2.5%	▲-0.3%	▲8.5%	3.0%
2017	▲25.9	▲60,281.7	▲12.1	▲28,237.9	▲1.3%	▲-1.3%	▲9.3%	▼2.8%
2018	▲26.5	▼59,953.3	▲13.6	▲30,666.6	▲0.1%	▲1.0%	▼8.7%	▼2.6%
2019	▲28.0	▲61,028.0	▼13.5	▼29,312.8	▲3.9%	▲-0.4%	▼6.8%	2.6%
2020	▲28.7	▲63,276.0	▼12.0	▼26,467.8	▲1.1%	▲1.9%	6.8%	▲2.9%
2021	▲29.4	▲68,416.7	▲14.0	▲32,573.3	▼-1.6%	▲1.7%	6.8%	▼2.5%
2022	▲31.9	▲74,196.0	▲18.5	▲42,939.4	▲1.2%	▲2.5%	6.8%	▼1.9%
2023	▲34.1	▲79,408.5	▼17.9	▼41,713.0	▲3.3%	▲2.0%	6.8%	1.9%
2024	▲36.0	▲83,693.3	▲18.1	▲42,046.7	▲3.2%	▲1.5%	6.8%	1.9%
2025	▲37.8	▲88,002.0	▲18.4	▲42,711.8	▲3.2%	▲1.0%	6.8%	1.9%
2026	▲39.5	▲91,921.3	▲18.7	▲43,499.7	▲2.5%	▲1.0%	6.8%	1.9%
2027	▲41.7	▲96,927.8	▲19.3	▲44,913.6	▲3.4%	▲1.0%	6.8%	▼1.8%

== See also ==
- List of companies of Brunei
- Corruption in Brunei
- Environmental issues in Brunei
- Brunei Economic Development Board
- Brunei Fertilizer Industries
- BIMP-EAGA
- Brunei–Guangxi Economic Corridor
- Department of Economic Planning and Statistics
- Ministry of Finance and Economy (Brunei)
- National Development Plan (Brunei)
- Wawasan Brunei 2035
