= Electricity sector in Brunei =

Electricity sector of Brunei
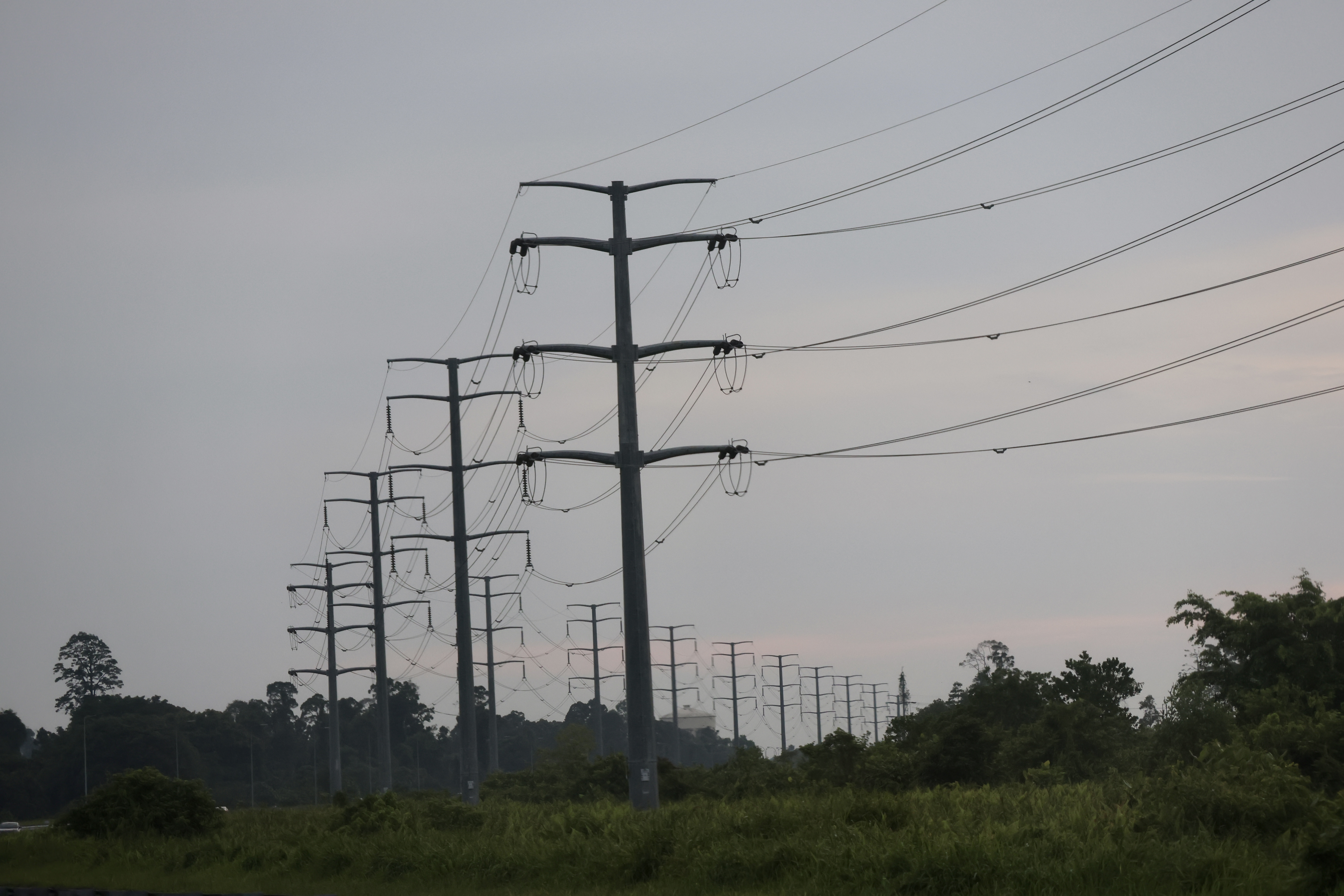
- Power lines along the Kuala Belait Highway in 2023.

Data
- Production (2010): 3,862 GWh
- Share of fossil energy: 100%

Institutions
- Responsibility for transmission: Department of Electrical Services
- Responsibility for regulation: Department of Electrical Services

The electricity sector in Brunei ranges from generation, transmission, distribution and sales of electricity in Brunei.

== Regulator ==
Electricity sector in Brunei is regulated by the Department of Electrical Services (DES; Malay: Jabatan Perkhidmatan Elektrik) under the Ministry of Energy.

== Generation ==
In 2010, electricity generation in Brunei reached 3,862,000,000 kWh, in which 99% of it was generated from natural gas sources and the remaining 1% was from oil sources.

=== Power stations ===
- Belingus Power Station
- Berakas Power Station
- Bukit Panggal Power Station
- Gadong Power Station
- Jerudong Power Station
- Lumut Power Station
- Seria Power Station

== Transmission ==
- 66 kV transmission lines from Seria to Bandar Seri Begawan

== See also ==
- Energy in Brunei
- Renewable energy in Brunei
- List of electricity sectors
