= Entreprenant =

Entreprenant or Entreprenante may refer to:

- Entreprenant (1965), port tug
- French ship Entreprenant or Entreprante: several ships of the Navy of France by the name
- HMS Entreprenante (1799)

== See also ==
- HMS Enterprise (1705), formerly L'Entreprise
