= Energy in Brunei =

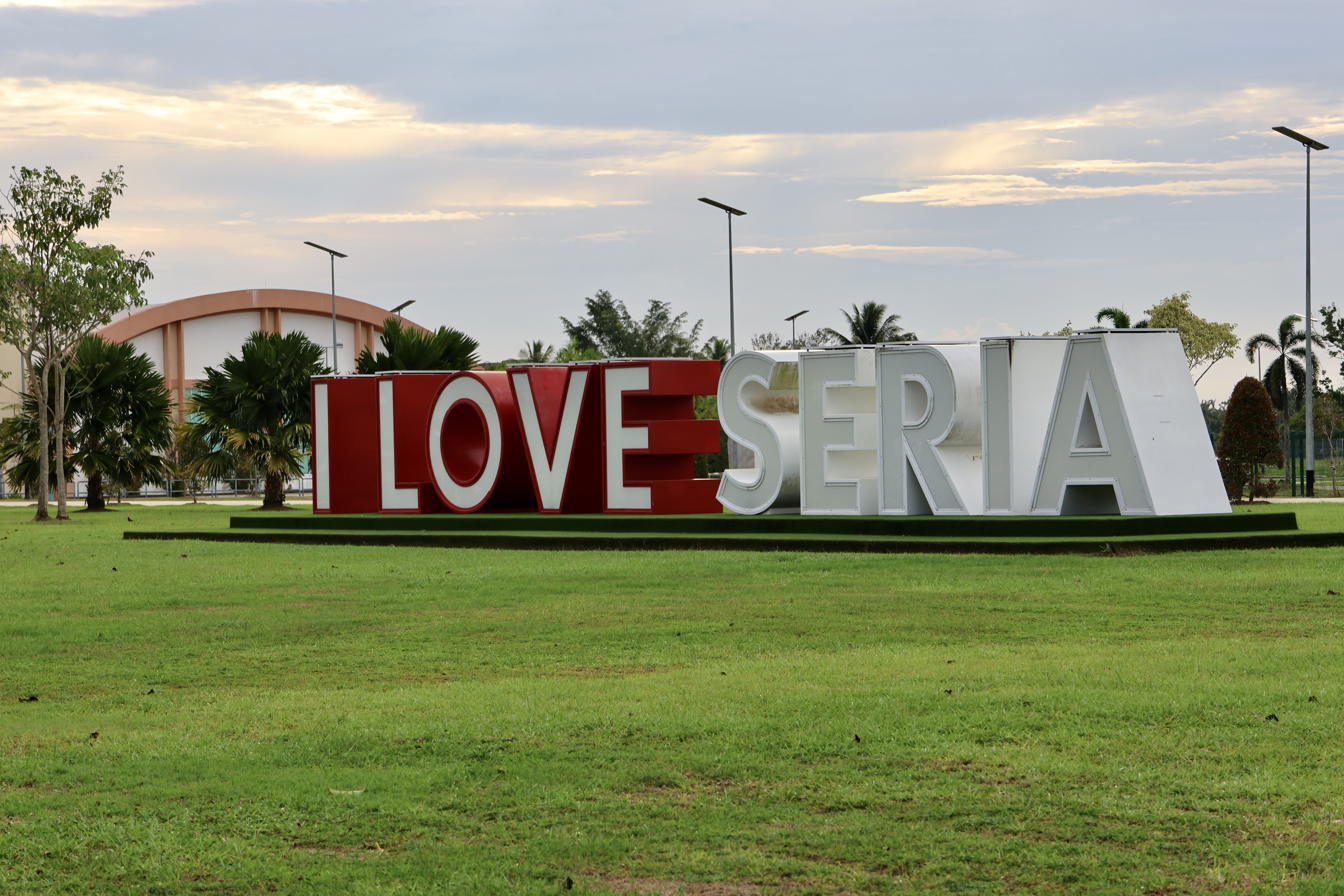
A solar-powered sign in Seria Energy Lab.

Energy in Brunei is related to all of the type of energy and its related infrastructure used in Brunei. Natural gas and diesel are used significantly in Brunei to generate domestic electricity, as well as gasoline and diesel to power its roads. Domestic supplies were undoubtedly still safe, but they were still susceptible to disturbances that would result in power outages and a lack of gasoline. To reduce the country's susceptibility and the economic hazards brought on by interrupted power and fuel shortages, it is crucial to strengthen the dependability of these sources.

== History ==
The first exploratory well was dug close to Brunei Town in 1899, marking the beginning of the country's oil business. Following that, the Seria field in the Belait District was discovered in 1929, and a succession of industrial discoveries led to Brunei's first oil export in 1932. The majority of Brunei's oil and gas profits come from Brunei Shell Petroleum (BSP), the country's main oil producer. The Oil Conservation Policy, in effect since 1981 when oil production reached its peak, is a crucial piece of legislation for the oil sector. In order to ensure that the country's commitment to export gas can be satisfied, Brunei Natural Gas Policy, a similar policy for the gas industry, was created in 2000.

Since 2006, Brunei's crude oil output has been trending downward. As the country's oil wells and platforms are getting older, which has caused production issues. The Department of Energy of the Prime Minister's Office has established eight strategic objectives as part of Brunei's long-term vision, which is centered on the expansion and improvement of the nation's energy sector. According to government statistics, Brunei is still fighting to emerge from a profound recession caused by record-low oil output in the second quarter of 2022, which resulted in the worst quarterly GDP fall of 4.4% in six years.

== Energy sources ==
In 2005, Brunei's total energy needs was 2,435 KTOE. As of 2022, approximately 127,000 barrels of oil and 243,000 barrels of natural gas equivalent are produced daily by Brunei's oil and gas fields.

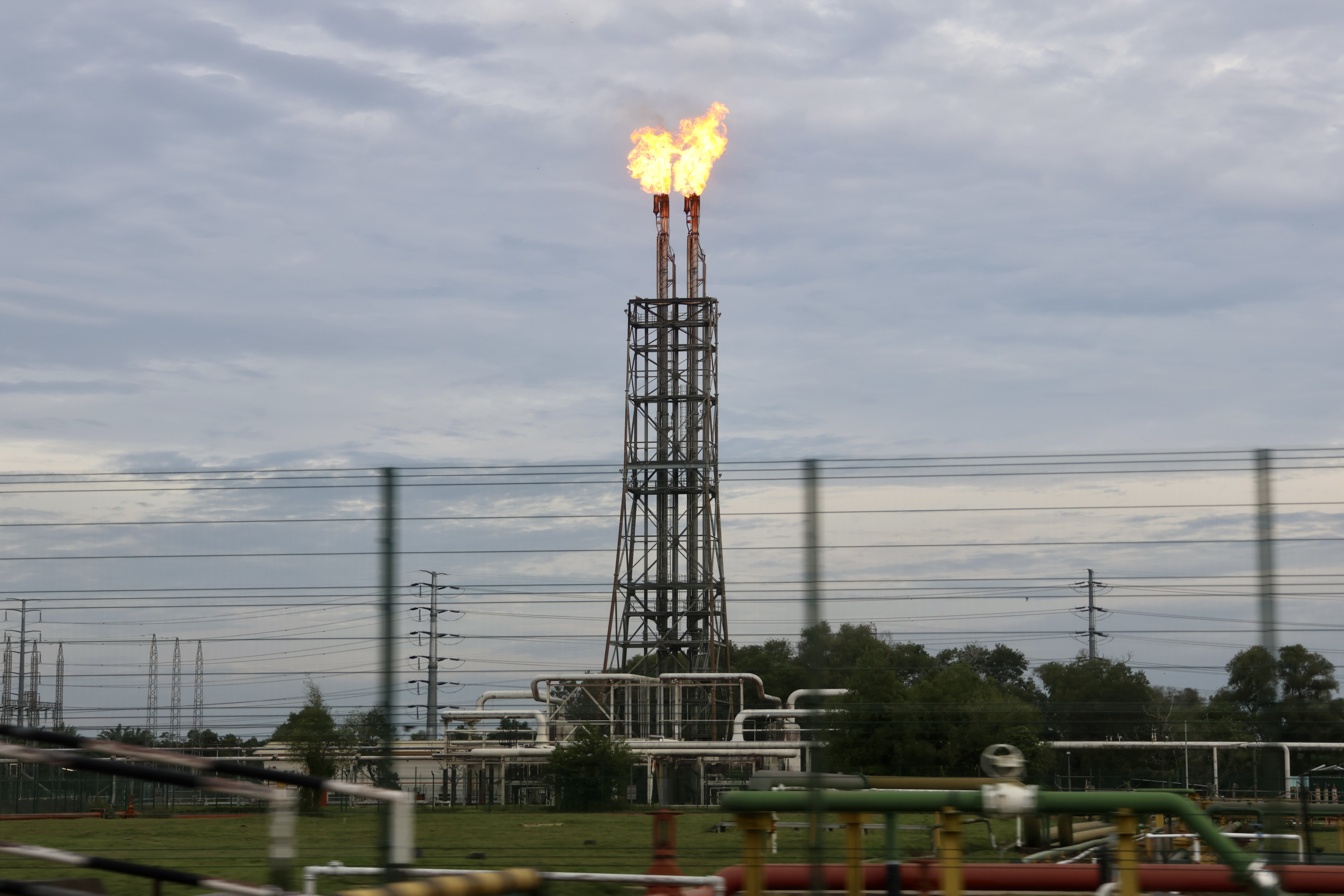
A refinery used for the oil field in Seria.

=== Oil ===
In 2005, oil supplied 24.4% of Brunei's total energy needs. Oil production from established fields and new forays into deep oceans are now economically feasible because to advancements in oil extraction technology and the present price of the commodity. Companies with this experience may thus discover new prospects in Brunei. The possibility of further on-shore and offshore reserves has been raised by other finds in the area, which may increase Brunei's interest in raising output. As of 2022, production of crude oil dropped below 100,000 barrels per day twice in less than a year, from 111,100 barrels per day to a record-low of 94,500 barrels per day. Oil production had earlier in Q3 2021 decreased to 97,100 barrels per day as a result of hundreds of COVID-19 instances discovered at the Champion 7 offshore oil field.

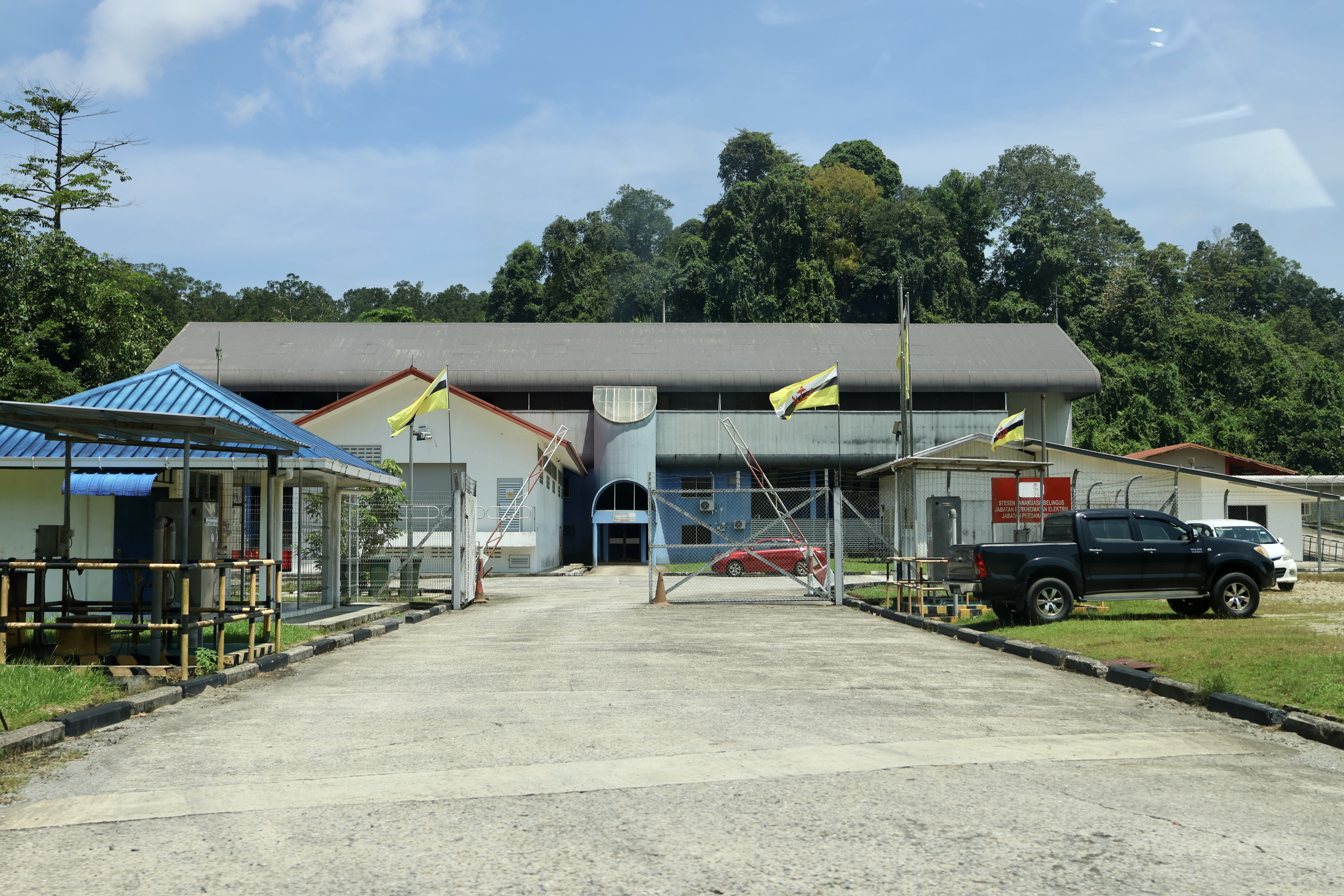
Belingos diesel power plant in Temburong.

=== Natural gas ===
In 2005, natural gas supplied 75.6% of Brunei's total energy needs. About 58% of the country's electrical needs, which primarily serve residential areas, are met by the Department of Electrical Services (DES), which also operates a diesel power plant (Belingos) and four natural gas power stations (Gadong 1A, Gadong 2, Bukit Panggal, and Lumut). The other 42% is supplied by the Berakas Power Company (BPC), which runs three major natural gas power stations (Berakas, Gadong 3, and Jerudong) and serves the majority of strategically important locations including government buildings, hospitals, an international airport, etc. In 2022, natural gas output decreased from 31.5 million cubic meters per day in Q2 2021 to 27.3 million cubic meters per day, while LNG production fell from 250 to 200 gigawatt-hours (852.7 to 685.4 billion British thermal units) per day.

=== Renewables ===
Brunei announced a strategic plan in 2014 with the goal of having 10% of renewable energy sources in the country's energy mix by 2035. The strategy outlines how to establish frameworks for renewable energy policy and regulation as well as increase the commercial deployment of solar PV.

There is no pressing need for the development of renewable energy (RE) in Brunei due to the abundance of oil and gas resources. Even nevertheless, the Brunei Vision 2035 Long-Term Development Plan acknowledges that the country's oil and gas reserves cannot keep up with the rising demand and population development. As a result, it seeks to diversify the economy while also supporting the oil and gas industry. Although there have been attempts to create a legal framework to support the development of renewable energy, no clear plans for its growth have yet been created. Brunei has already put in place a 1.2 MW solar power demonstration facility. In the future, this factory will be expanded.

== Energy consumption ==
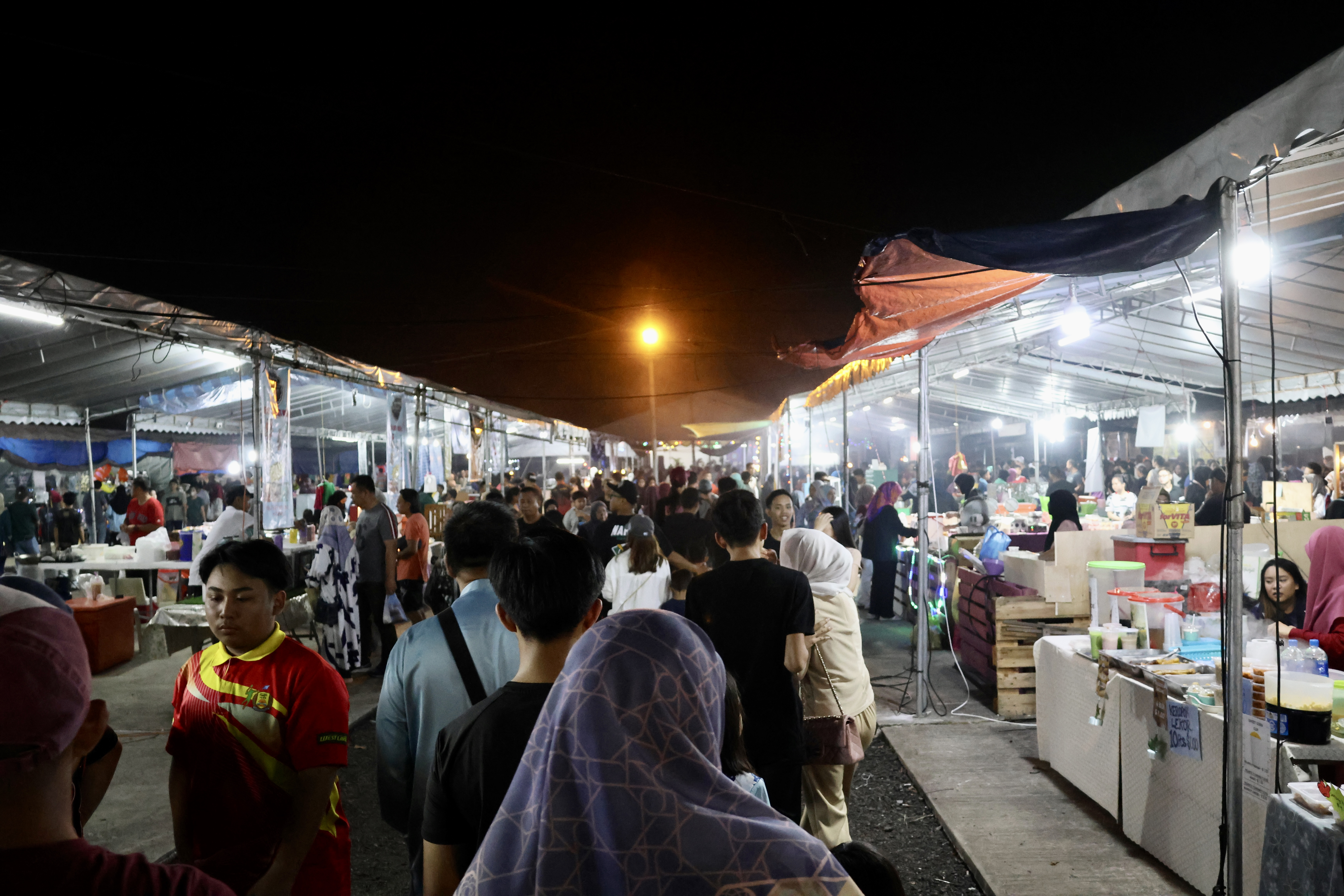
Electricity being consumed at a celebratory night market.

Brunei's total primary energy supply (TPES) and total final energy consumption (TFEC)'s historical oil and gas trend, particularly, 80% and 20% of TPES are made up of oil and natural gas, respectively. Oil saw annual increase of 0.7% from 2010 to 2017, however natural gas saw annual growth of -0.9% because of a decline in natural gas output. The TFEC rose at a 2% annual pace throughout the same time period, while oil consumption climbed at a greater rate, 2.8%, than the TFEC. While electricity use increased by 0.7% annually, natural gas consumption decreased by 4.6% annually.

About half of the nation's total energy usage is used for transportation. Over 90% of the fleet is made up of private automobiles, with various vehicle types making up the remaining 10%. Vehicles powered by gasoline and diesel account for the majority, 78% and 21%, respectively. According to statistics, there were around 282,345 active automobiles for every 442,400 people in the country in 2018, which equates to an average of 0.59 active vehicles per person. In 2005, energy consumption in Brunei were as follows:

- Transportation sector 56.2% (719 KTOE)
- Residential or commercial sector 32.8% (236 KTOE)
- Industrial sector 11.0% (79 KTOE)

== Carbon emissions ==
One of the nations with the lowest carbon dioxide emissions is Brunei. Despite being insignificant, emissions are anticipated to rise dramatically over the following few years as the economy expands. As a result, as a signatory to the Paris Agreement, the nation has committed to reducing all of its emissions by 2035 through the following measures:

- Energy sector – decrease total energy consumption by 63%.
- Land transport sector – decrease CO_{2} emissions from morning-peak-hour vehicle use by 40%.
- Forestry sector – increase total gazette forest reserve area from 41% to 55%.

== See also ==
- Renewable energy in Brunei
- Electricity sector in Brunei
- Economy of Brunei
