= Enterprise, Missouri =

Enterprise, Missouri, may refer to:

- Enterprise, Linn County, Missouri, an unincorporated community
- Enterprise, McDonald County, Missouri, a ghost town
- Enterprise, Shelby County, Missouri, an unincorporated community
