= Enterprize Canada =

- Founded: 2001
- Location: Vancouver, British Columbia
- Founder: Michael Lee
- Affiliations: Sauder School of Business; University of British Columbia
- Website: www.enterprizecanada.org

Enterprize Canada was a student-run, not-for-profit organization with a focus on promoting entrepreneurship while providing opportunities to young entrepreneurs to grow and develop their ideas. Established in 2001 under the leadership of founder Michael Lee and other undergraduate business students from the Sauder School of Business at the University of British Columbia, Enterprize Canada hosts Canada's largest student-run business plan competition and entrepreneurship conference. Over 250 student-delegates, industry professionals, and young entrepreneurs from across Canada met annually in Vancouver, BC in this two-part event. While the conference and the business plan competition were the highlight events of the organization, Enterprize Canada hosted and participated in a number of community-based activities through workshops, conferences and social events that connects students in universities across Canada. Since 2009, Enterprize has also hosted the annual miniEnterprize conference which connects young innovators in across twenty high schools throughout British Columbia. The group has been inactive since 2014.

== Conference ==
Hosted in Vancouver, BC, the Enterprize Canada Entrepreneurship Conference has welcomed over 250 delegates annually from across Canada. Students from a wide range of disciplines are connected through a series of interactive workshops, professional networking sessions, and nightly social events.

Past Locations

- 2013 – One Wall Centre
- 2012 – Hyatt Regency Vancouver
- 2010 – One Wall Centre
- 2009 – Hyatt Regency Vancouver
- 2008 – One Wall Centre
- 2007 – Fairmont Hotel Vancouver
- 2006 – Fairmont Waterfront
- 2005 – One Wall Centre

== Business Plan Competition ==
The business plan competition brings together teams of two to six students from several accredited Canadian post-secondary institutions. Teams first participate in regional competitions in their respective regions:

- Enterprize West 2012 (BC, Alberta, Saskatchewan, Yukon, NWT) - University of BC
- Enterprize Central 2012 (Manitoba, Ontario, Nunavut) - University of Guelph
- Enterprize Quebec 2012 (Quebec) - McGill University
- Enterprize Atlantic 2012 (New Brunswick, Nova Scotia, PEI, Newfoundland, & Labrador) - Mount Allison University

The top business plans from each region will go on to compete in the national competition in Vancouver, BC in early February.

In 2008, 100 teams from 16 different Canadian post-secondary institutions were selected to compete in their respective regional competitions. Of these 100, the top three were chosen from each of the four regions to compete in the national finals in Vancouver. Over $80,000 in prize money was awarded in 2008, with a $20,000 business grant awarded to the top team. With a prize pool worth over $100,000, the 2009 competition will be the largest of its kind in Canada.

== Past winners ==
2012

1st Place – Kaizen Biomedical – University of BC
2nd Place – Infinitives – McGill University
3rd Place – Conisys Electronics – University of BC

2010

1st Place – DragonFly Instruments – University of BC
2nd Place – Aegis – University of BC
3rd Place – Aeos Biomedical – University of BC

2009

1st Place – VSM Technologies – Carleton University
2nd Place – EasyPlug – University of BC
3rd Place – Carve – Simon Fraser University

2008

1st Place – VerifyRx – University of New Brunswick
2nd Place – Daily Splice – University of Victoria
3rd Place – TechTouch – Schulich School of Business, York University
PwC Innovation Award – LDCA Innovations – École de technologie supérieure (Université du Québec)

2007

1st Place – Divisio Technologies – Dalhousie University
2nd Place – NeoSpectra Technologies – Simon Fraser University
3rd Place – Effiventa Corporation – University of Manitoba

2006

1st Place – Sunpeak Foods – University of Manitoba – Company established 2006

2005

1st Place – Energy Aware – University of British Columbia

== Affiliations ==
- University of British Columbia
- Sauder School of Business
