= Enterprise, Ohio =

Enterprise, Ohio may refer to:

- Enterprise, Hocking County, Ohio, an unincorporated community
- Enterprise, Preble County, Ohio, an unincorporated community

== See also ==
- Enterprise (disambiguation)
