= Enterprise, California =

Enterprise, California may refer to:

- Enterprise, Amador County, California
- Enterprise, Butte County, California
- Enterprise, Lake County, California
- Enterprise, Shasta County, California
