= Renewable energy in Brunei =

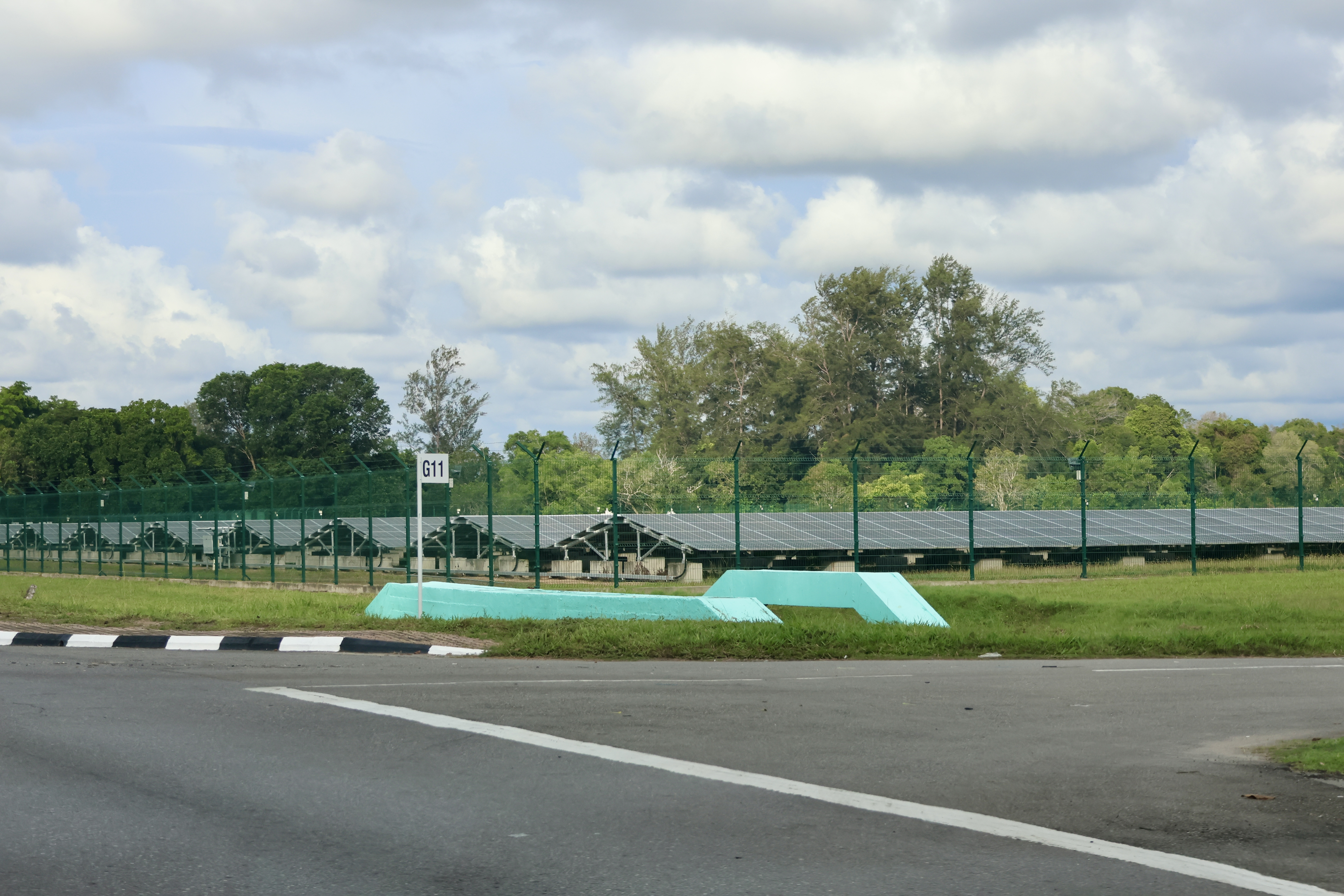
BSP Flagship Solar PV in 2024

Only 0.05% of Brunei's power was generated using renewable energy, with the remaining 99.95% coming from fossil fuels. The nation established a 10% renewable energy target in the electricity generating mix by 2035 in 2014. When it comes to renewable energy, Brunei has yet to significantly advance and establish itself as a desirable location for investment. From 2020 to 2035, the percentage of renewables must rise by 0.66% year in order to reach the aim. To further the growth of renewable energy, particularly solar energy, which is more plentiful than wind energy, the nation still has to implement a regulatory framework.

Even though they only make up 0.55% of installed capacity at the moment, Brunei wants to increase the share of renewable energy in its generating mix to 30% by 2035. Other ambitious goals include developing and enacting a carbon pricing or tax mechanism by 2025 and assisting multinational oil and gas clients in meeting their net-zero commitments. The development of the nation's clean energy market and the satisfaction of corporate demand for renewable energy are anticipated to be aided by the implementation of the I-REC(E) certificate.

== Background ==
Brunei and the United Arab Emirates (UAE), two oil-rich nations, use oil and gas as a key source of energy and heavily rely on it for their economies. Their energy roadmaps, however, have also been affected by the global energy shift toward more sustainable energy generation. According to its Wawasan 2035, Brunei wants to deploy up to 10% more renewable energy by the year 2035, while the UAE wants to reach 50% of its energy mix from renewable sources by the year 2050. According to the Brunei Energy White Paper, the country pledges to renewable energy are mostly motivated by its worries about energy security. In order to realize its vision by 2035, the Bruneian government establishes three strategic goals.

The primary goal is to enhance oil's upstream and downstream systems. The second goal is to promote the growth of sustainable energy, and the third goal is to maximize economic growth in the energy sector. The Brunei government has pledged to enhance renewable energy, particularly solar PV, in order to assure the growth of sustainable energy. Brunei also intended to build the Temburong Smart City, which would mostly rely on solar energy and be dubbed the "Green Jewel of Brunei." However, Brunei has only put in 1.2 MW of solar as of now as a demonstration project. It's reasonable to assume that the implementation of renewable energy is still in its infancy. There are, however, particular actions Brunei might take to quicken this process and increase its involvement in sustainable energy in the ASEAN area.

Currently, oil income still account for 73% of Brunei's GDP. While oil output is at its highest, the country could begin devoting a portion of this to encourage RE and attract investment. This will enable Brunei to make a smooth transition to RE and lessen its reliance on the oil and gas industry. Brunei should be aware that the cost of renewable energy technology has been steadily falling over the past ten years, and the nation might profit from it if the appropriate renewable energy framework is put in place today. As an effort to further realise this, the Brunei Government has made a good start by restructuring the Ministry of Energy, Manpower and Industry (MEMI) since July 2018. Previously serving as the Energy and Industry Department at the Prime Minister’s Office (EIDPMO), the new ministry is mandated to foresee the country’s energy, industry and manpower as its core roles.

== Sources ==
=== Solar power ===
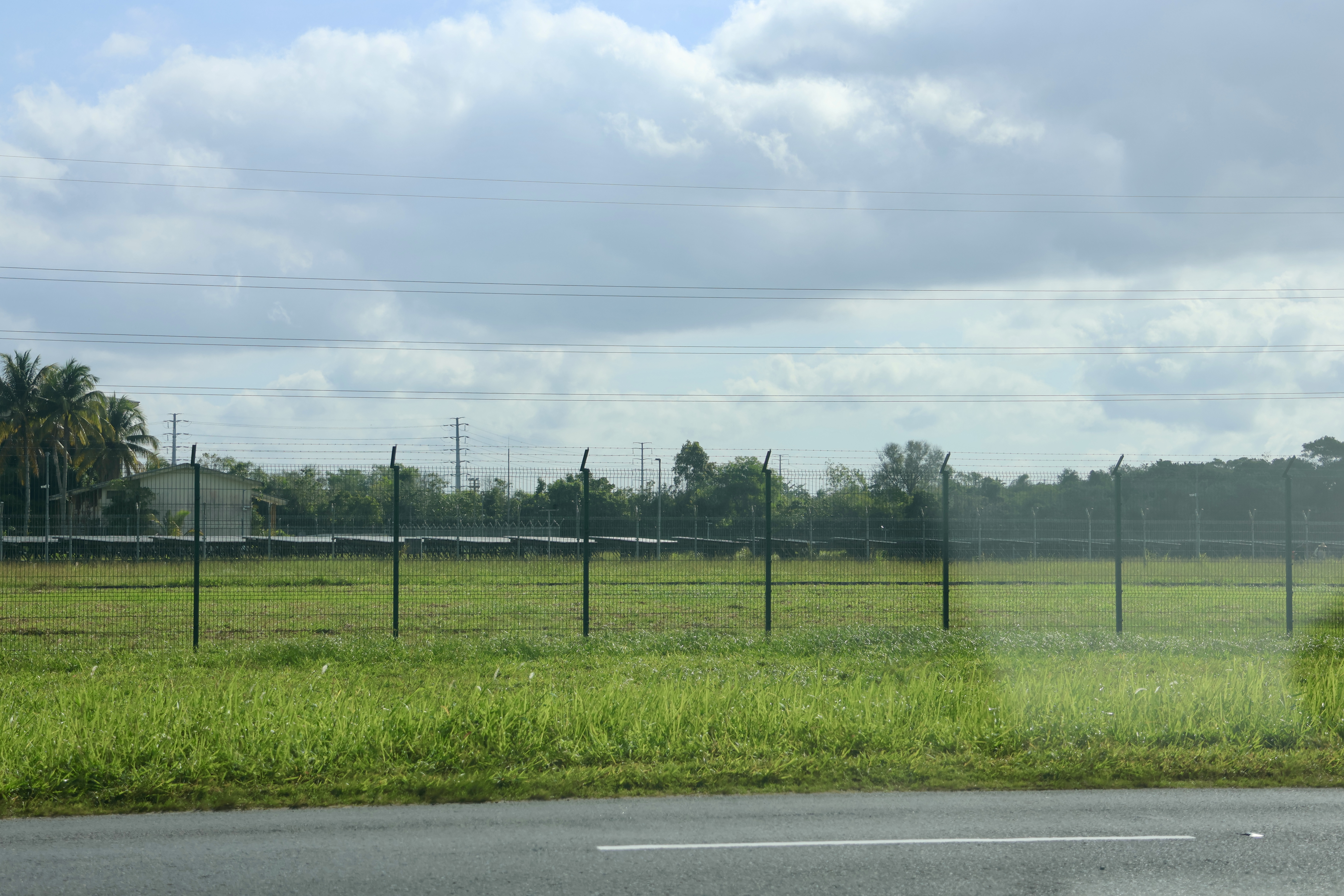
Tenaga Suria Brunei in 2024

Brunei opened its first solar power plant, the 1.2 MW Tenaga Suria Brunei photovoltaic power plant, on 26 May 2011 by Sultan Hassanal Bolkiah. The plant powers up around 200 houses in the nation. The facility spent two years in the assessment and analysis phase with the aim of determining the performance traits of six different types of PV panels and, consequently, determining the optimal PV panel under Brunei climatic circumstances. Following the assessment phase, the Department of Electrical Services assumed control of the facility in 2013, and is now responsible for daily plant maintenance and operation. The plant is now operated by the Department of Electrical Services, Ministry of Energy, and contributes around 0.14 percent of the overall power producing capacity of the nation.

On 1 January 2020, the BSP Energy Transition team was created to lead the BSJV's assistance of Brunei's decarbonization process. The team serves as a conduit to the Brunei Climate Change secretariat and strives to be the center of excellence for low-carbon solutions. It collaborates with various teams and functions to lessen the overall carbon footprint associated with operating the oil and gas industry. In order to provide a new portfolio for BSJV in the months and years to ahead with constantly changing technology. BSP wants to enhance the use of renewable energy in both its operational and passive assets. The 3.3MW BSP Flagship Solar PV plant at Jalan Tengah, Seria, is Brunei's second solar power plant. It was completed in 2021 and started to produce electricity on 30 March 2021. With almost 7,000 solar panels, it is capable of generating power equivalent to 600 houses.

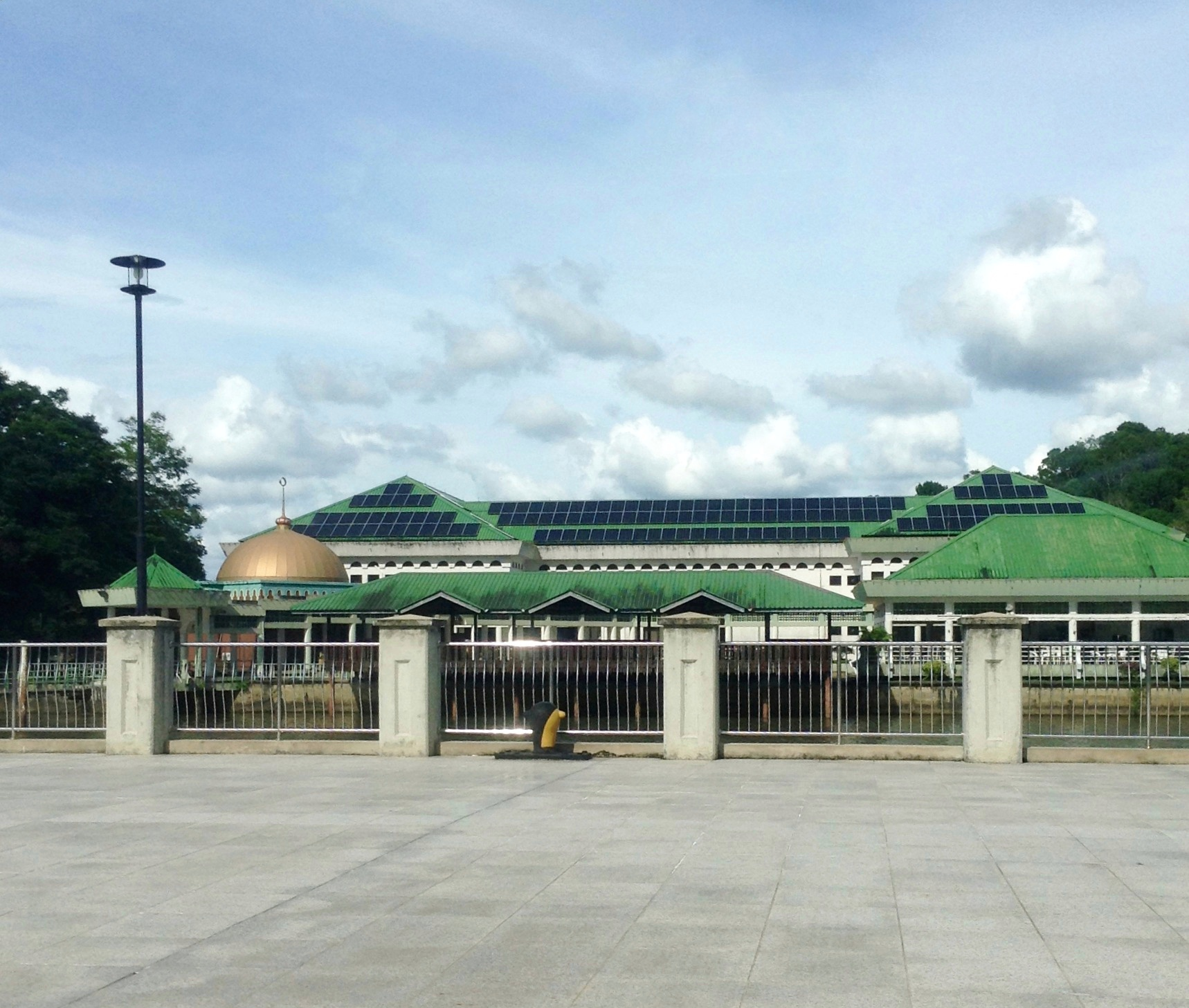
Solar panels installed on a Brunei government building in Temburong

The Temburong District Office is now Brunei's first solar-powered government structure thanks to the installation of 255 solar panels on its rooftop. The solar power system can produce 100 kWp of clean energy and is anticipated to reduce annual electricity costs by up to $11,000, according to a statement released on 10 July 2021 by the Ministry of Energy. The initiative, which will cost $97,474, is a part of the government's effort to switch from fossil fuels to renewable energy. The solar panels at the Temburong District Office, can absorb 1,330 trees' worth of carbon dioxide each year, or roughly 66 tonnes less than they would otherwise emit.

Cost is the primary obstacle to the growth of renewable energy generation in the sultanate. Due to the country's extensive hydrocarbon deposits, which are used to fuel its thermal power plants to produce energy, Brunei has some of the lowest electricity costs in the area. Due to the fact that grid parity has not yet been attained, this does not encourage individuals to install their own solar panels. When the cost of generating electricity from renewable sources is equal to or less expensive than buying it from the national grid, it is considered to have attained grid parity.

=== Biomass power ===
A research study on how waste products may be utilised for the benefit of the nation was presented in 2014. Based on the research's presentation, it was observed that biomass may be a perfect substitute for the Sultanate's usage of oil and gas because the nation has a lot of underutilized biomass that could be used as a feedstock for pyrolysis. Rice husk, sawdust, maize fiber, coconut fiber, and corn shell and fiber were some of the biomass solid wastes used for the project. According to the research, all five of the biomass feed materials were discovered to have the following qualities: high GCV, low ash content, low moisture content, and high volatile yield. The amount of heat generated by the burning of the biomass is measured in gross calorific value (GCV). A preferable choice is biomass with a greater GCV.

== Private sector involvement ==
Several projects and actions have been put into place in the country in accordance with objectives and goals in energy efficiency, conservation, and renewable energy. The Ministry of Energy has pledged to raise the capacity of renewable energy to at least 300 megawatts. Using a public-private partnership (PPP) model, the ministry is now planning to build a 30 megawatt solar plant in Kampong Belimbing in Mukim Kota Batu. There are plans made by the government of Brunei to construct the largest power plant in Brunei at Sungai Akar with a capacity of 30MW, along with two more power plants at Tutong (Bukit Panggal) and Temburong (Kampong Belingos) by 2025. An expansion project for Tenaga Suria Brunei which aims to increase its capacity from 1.2MW into 4.2MW, is also planned.

In April 2021, Kampong Perdayan erected 75 solar street lights along Jalan Labu. Since 2018, solar panels have also been placed on longhouses in Tutong and Belait's interior. During the launch event, the Department of Electrical Services also celebrated 100 years of power provision. To provide the area with more dependable energy, a 6 KV network is being developed from the Mentiri main electric system to the new Perdayan Station in Temburong. Once the project is finished in 2023, the Belingos Power Station will no longer require diesel generators.

== See also ==
- Energy in Brunei
