= Enterprise Building =

Enterprise Building may refer to:

- Enterprise Building (Worcester, Massachusetts), listed on the National Register of Historic Places in Worcester County, Massachusetts
- Enterprise Building (High Point, North Carolina), listed on the National Register of Historic Places in Guilford County, North Carolina
- Enterprise Building (Palmyra, Wisconsin), listed on the National Register of Historic Places in Jefferson County, Wisconsin
- Enterprise Building (China), headquarters of a Chinese gaming company shaped like the Starship Enterprise
