= Enterprise, Shasta County, California =

Unincorporated community in California, United States

Coordinates: 40°33′50″N 122°20′34″W

Enterprise was an unincorporated community in Shasta County, California, United States. It was annexed into the city of Redding by voters in the November 2, 1976 election. The annexation was hotly contested, as reported in the Redding Record Searchlight.

It lies at an elevation of 538 feet (164 m).
