= Enterprise for High School Students =

Non-profit organization in San Francisco, California, USA

Enterprise for High School Students (EHSS) is a youth development agency in San Francisco, California that guides teens to explore career interests, find and retain jobs, and engage in experiential learning. Established in 1969, EHSS is a 501(c) non-profit community organization.

== Mission ==
The mission of EHSS is to increase student preparedness to explore and pursue career paths through training, counseling and guidance; to offer a variety of experiential options within the work world; and to provide a support network to raise youth's personal expectations for success.

== Services ==
Annually, EHSS serves over 2000 students, ages 14–18, from both public and independent schools. Through a broad array of programs, EHSS provides a means for students to gain an understanding of how their interests and talents can be integrated into employment, community service, and educational opportunities, while finding their potential. Of particular note are the Summer Gardening, Junior Caddie, and Party Assistance programs.

== Fundraising ==
Fund raising efforts include the San Francisco Fall Antiques Show, an annual antiques trade fair established in 1982 as the major fundraising event for EHSS.

Another fundraising event for EHSS, the Art Tour, visits the homes of some of San Francisco's prominent art collectors and view their distinguished museum quality private collections.
