= Sunpeak Foods =

- Founded: 2006
- Legal status: Acquired
- Website: Sunpeakfoods.com

Sunpeak Foods Inc. was a company specializing in research, development, commercialization, and marketing of novel food products in the natural and organic foods industry.

== Overview ==
The company was a fast growing natural and specialty food brand available throughout Canada and in select U.S. regions. Several Multiwise products were carried in over 1,000 retail locations including Whole Foods, HEB, Kroger, Sobeys, Safeway and many other national and independent retailers. The company's original product offerings were positioned for University and College foodservice operations with representation across North America through Aramark and distribution through Sysco, U.S. Foods, and other broadline distributors.
