= Corruption in Brunei =

Corruption in Brunei is mainly handled by the Anti-Corruption Bureau (ACB) which is an enforcement agency established on 1 February 1982 under the Prevention of Corruption Act (Chapter 131) whose director reports directly to Hassanal Bolkiah. Freedom House's Freedom in the World report rated Brunei's safeguards against official corruption as relatively effective. In Transparency International's 2025 Corruption Perceptions Index, Brunei scored 63 out of 100 and ranked 31st out of 182 countries.

== Anti-corruption efforts ==
On 1 February 1982, the Anti-Corruption Bureau was established to enforce the Prevention of Corruption Act (Chapter 131). The first director was Ali Mohammad Daud, who reported directly to Hassanal Bolkiah It initially operated with a team drawn from the Royal Brunei Police Force before moving into its own headquarters at Old Airport in March 1992, alongside a branch in Kuala Belait founded in 1987. On 17 October 2022, Sultan Hassanal Bolkiah appointed Anifa Rafiza Abdul Ghani as director of the Anti-Corruption Bureau.

According to the 2023 Freedom in the World report, conducted by Freedom House Brunei was given 3/4 in the section stating “Are safeguards against official corruption strong and effective?”. In 2024, Halbi Mohammad Yussof state corruption and bribery will be liabilities for the organization and individual.

=== Cases of corruption ===
In 2020, two former judges were convicted for embezzlement of over millions of dollars from government controlled accounts.

== Corruption Perceptions Index ==
In Transparency International's 2025 Corruption Perceptions Index, which scored 182 countries on a scale from 0 ("highly corrupt") to 100 ("very clean"), Brunei scored 63. When ranked by score, Brunei ranked 31st among the 182 countries in the Index, where the country ranked first is perceived to have the most honest public sector. For comparison with regional scores, the best score among those countries of the Asia Pacific region that appeared in the Index (Note: Afghanistan, Australia, Bangladesh, Bhutan, Brunei Darussalam, Cambodia, China, Fiji, Hong Kong, India, Indonesia, Japan, North Korea, South Korea, Laos, Malaysia, Maldives, Mongolia, Myanmar, Nepal, New Zealand, Pakistan, Papua New Guinea, Philippines, Singapore, Solomon Islands, Sri Lanka, Taiwan, Thailand, Timor-Leste, Vanuatu, Vietnam) was 84, the average score was 45 and the worst score was 15. For comparison with worldwide scores, the best score was 89 (ranked 1), the average score was 42, and the worst score was 9 (ranked 181, in a two-way tie).
