= Enterprise Building (High Point, North Carolina) =

Historic building in North Carolina, US

- U.S. National Register of Historic Places
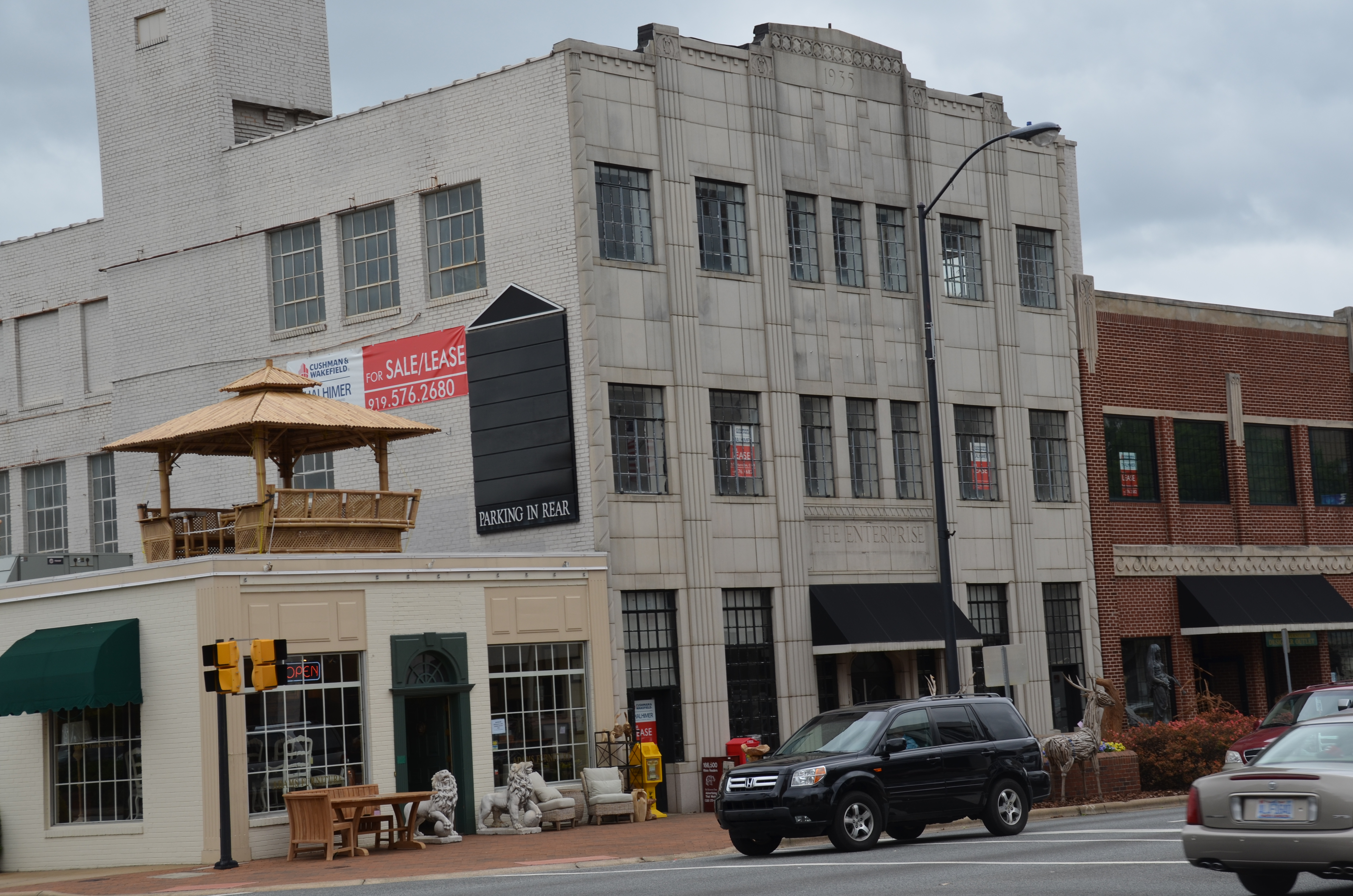
- Enterprise Building, April 2013

- Location within North Carolina Location within the United States
- Location: 305 N. Main St., High Point, North Carolina
- Coordinates: 35°57′34″N 80°00′26″W
- Area: 0.17 acres (0.069 ha)
- Built: 1935, 1945, c. 2010
- Built by: R. K. Stewart & Son
- Architect: Ferree, Tyson T.
- Architectural style: Art Deco
- NRHP reference No.: 14000985
- Added to NRHP: December 2, 2014

The Enterprise Building is a historic commercial building located at High Point, Guilford County, North Carolina. It was built in 1935, and is a three-story, five-bay, brick building with a full cast stone Art Deco-style façade. It was originally built as a two-story building and enlarged to three stories in 1945.

It was listed on the National Register of Historic Places in 2014.
