= Enterprise (soundtrack) =

Soundtrack album by Dennis McCarthy
- Released: May 14, 2002
- Genre: Soundtrack
- Length: 49:30
- Label: Decca
- Producers: Nick Patrick and Russell Watson

Enterprise is the soundtrack for the first season of Star Trek: Enterprise. It features the opening title song, "Where My Heart Will Take Me", as sung by Russell Watson, alongside instrumental compositions by Dennis McCarthy.

== Background ==
McCarthy first became involved in composing music for Star Trek with the first episode of Star Trek: The Next Generation, "Encounter At Farpoint". He went on to work on several more Star Trek series, along with the film Star Trek Generations. He won an Emmy Award for his composition of the theme tune for Star Trek: Deep Space Nine. He recorded the score for the pilot episode, "Broken Bow", with an orchestra on September 10 and 11, 2001. Despite an offer to postpone the recording on the second day because of the September 11 attacks, they decided to continue recording the music. McCarthy described this as "the hardest recording session of my entire career".

It was rumoured that Jerry Goldsmith would compose the theme tune for Enterprise, having previously created the themes for both The Next Generation and Star Trek: Voyager. This was later denied on his official website, and series executive producer Rick Berman explained that they would be seeking to use "a little bit more contemporary kind of music". Other composers who worked on Enterprise included Paul Ballinger, David Bell, Jay Chattaway, John Frizzell, Kevin Kiner, Mark McKenzie, Velton Ray Bunch and Brian Tyler.

== Release ==
The album was released in the United States on May 14, 2002 on the Decca Records label. The release was an Enhanced CD featuring the music video of "Where My Heart Will Take Me".

It included two versions of the title song of Enterprise, entitled "Where My Heart Will Take Me", which had been previously called "Faith of the Heart". The song was written by Diane Warren and sung by Russell Watson. A version of the song that had been re-recorded for Watson's album Encore appeared alongside the version that accompanied the opening credits of the television series. The remaining tracks on the album were instrumental music composed by McCarthy for the pilot episode of Enterprise, "Broken Bow".

== Reception ==
Professional ratings
Review scores
Source	Rating
Allmusic	3/5 stars
Tracksounds.com	(7/10)

In his review for Allmusic, Neil Shurley said that "Where My Heart Will Take Me" sounded better on the album than it did on the television show, but didn't tie in with McCarthy's work, whose work he described as an "orchestral tapestry". Overall he said that "There's nothing spectacular here, but Enterprise does make a representative and worthy addition to the Star Trek musical canon".

== Track listing ==
1. Where My Heart Will Take Me (Album Version)
2. New Enterprise
3. Klingon Chase - Shotgunned
4. Enterprise First Flight
5. Klang-Napped
6. Morph-O-Mama-Suli-Nabbed
7. Phaser Fight
8. Breakthrough
9. Grappled
10. The Rescue
11. Temporal Battle
12. Blood Work
13. New Horizons
14. Archer's Theme
15. Where My Heart Will Take Me (TV Version)
