= The Enterprise (Katoomba) =

Former newspaper in Australia

The Enterprise was an Australian newspaper established in Katoomba, New South Wales, in June 1913.

== History ==
In June 1913 a small newspaper called The Enterprise was begun in Katoomba. According to the Echo's announcement of its birth, the paper "had been hatching for a considerable period as an advertising sheet". (Echo, 13 June 1913). This explains the high numbering of the one issue known to have survived, a microfilm copy of which is held by the Blue Mountains City Library: 3 September 1913 (Vol.2. No.104). This issue was "printed and published by W. Hickson, Proprietor, Katoomba Street, Katoomba". the Echo says the proprietors were "Messrs Hickson and Millard". It is not known when it ceased publication.

== Digitisation ==
The Enterprise has been digitised as part of the Australian Newspapers Digitisation Program project of the National Library of Australia.

== See also ==
- List of newspapers in New South Wales
- List of newspapers in Australia
