= Entreprenant (1965) =

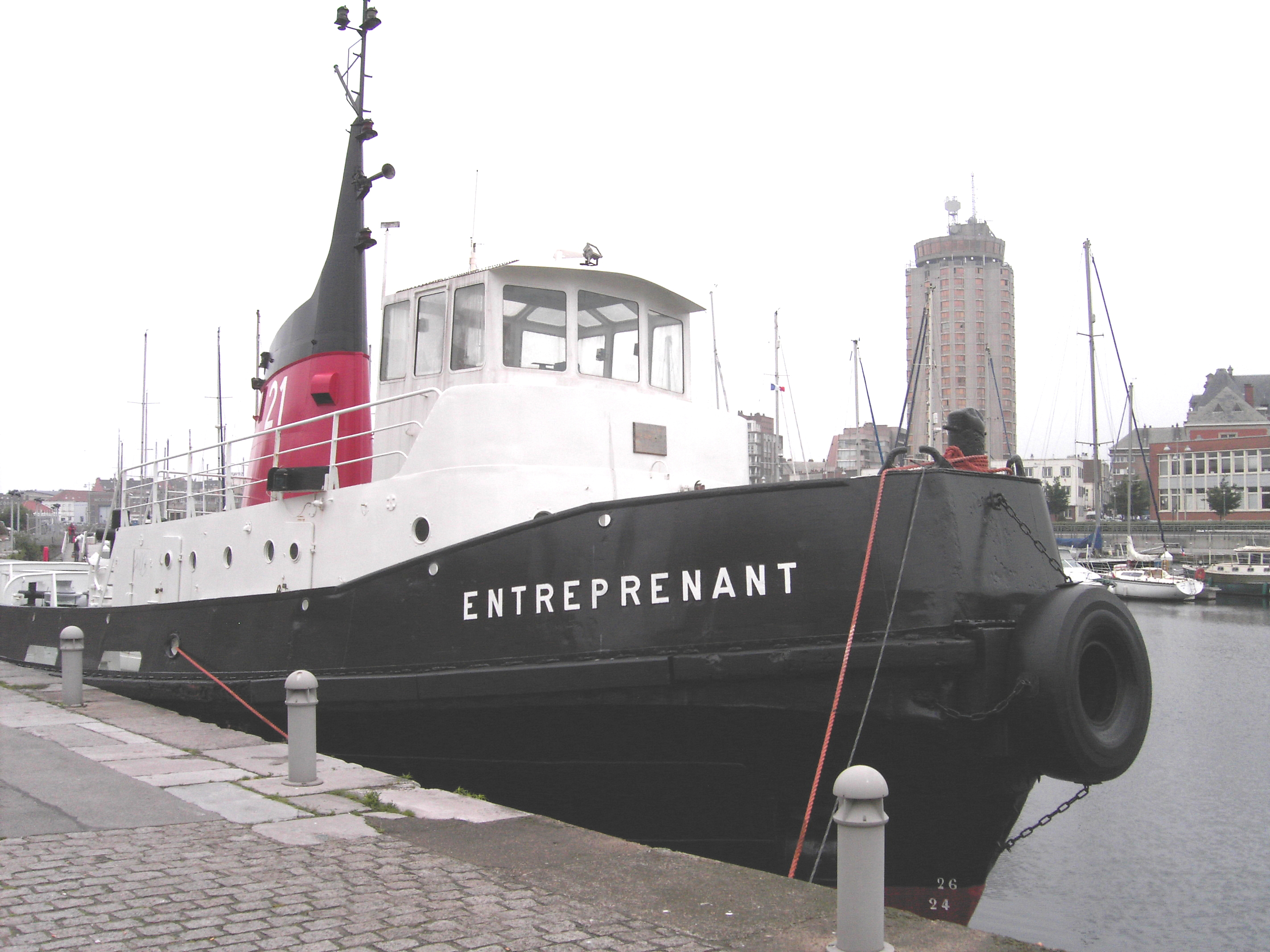
- Entreprenant in Dunkirk Port Museum

History

France
- Name: Entreprenant
- Owner: previously Abeilles International; Dunkirk Port Museum
- Port of registry: Dunkirk
- Builder: Ziegler Frères, Dunkirk
- Yard number: 152
- Home port: Dunkirk, France
- Identification: IMO number: 6519338; Callsign: TO2058
- Fate: Museum ship in Dunkirk
- Status: Undergoing restoration

General characteristics
- Type: Port tug
- Tonnage: 207 GT
- Length: 32.30 m (106 ft 0 in)
- Beam: 8.0 m (26 ft 3 in)
- Draught: 4.5 m (14 ft 9 in)
- Speed: 13 knots (24 km/h; 15 mph)
- Crew: 5
- Notes: Bollard pull: 25.0 tons

Entreprenant was a port tug built in 1965. She is now undergoing restoration as a floating exhibit in Dunkirk Port Museum.

== History ==
Entreprenant and her sister, Audacieux were built in 1965 by Ziegler Frères, Dunkirk.

After more than 40 years service, mainly in Dunkirk, Entreprenant was decommissioned and given to the Port Museum. She will be restored and then opened to visitors as part of the floating museum.
