= French ship Entreprenant =

Twelve ships of the French Navy have borne the name Entreprenant and four Entreprenante, after the French word for "enterprising"

== Ships named Entreprenant ==
- Vigilant (1672), a 30-gun ship of the line, was started as Entreprenant
- Entreprenant (1673), a Caché-class frigate-fireship
- Étourdi (1674), a 6-gun fireship, bore the name
- Entreprenant (1680), a 54-gun ship of the line
- Entreprenant (1751), a 74-gun Magnifique-class ship of the line
- Entreprenant (1787), a 74-gun Téméraire-class ship of the line
- Entreprenant (1800–1800), an aviso, captured by the Royal Navy in 1800
- Entreprenant (1800–1801), an aviso, captured by the Royal Navy in 1801
- Entreprenant (1807), exchanged with captives
- Entreprenant, captured and disposed of in 1808
- Entreprenant (1808), an 18-gun brig, captured during the Invasion of Île de France. Broken up as unfit for Royal Navy service.
- Entreprenant (1849), a 20-gun brig
- Entreprenant (1917), an auxiliary patrol boat
- Entreprenant (1940), a Le Fier-class torpedo boat
Ships of the French Navy named Entreprenant
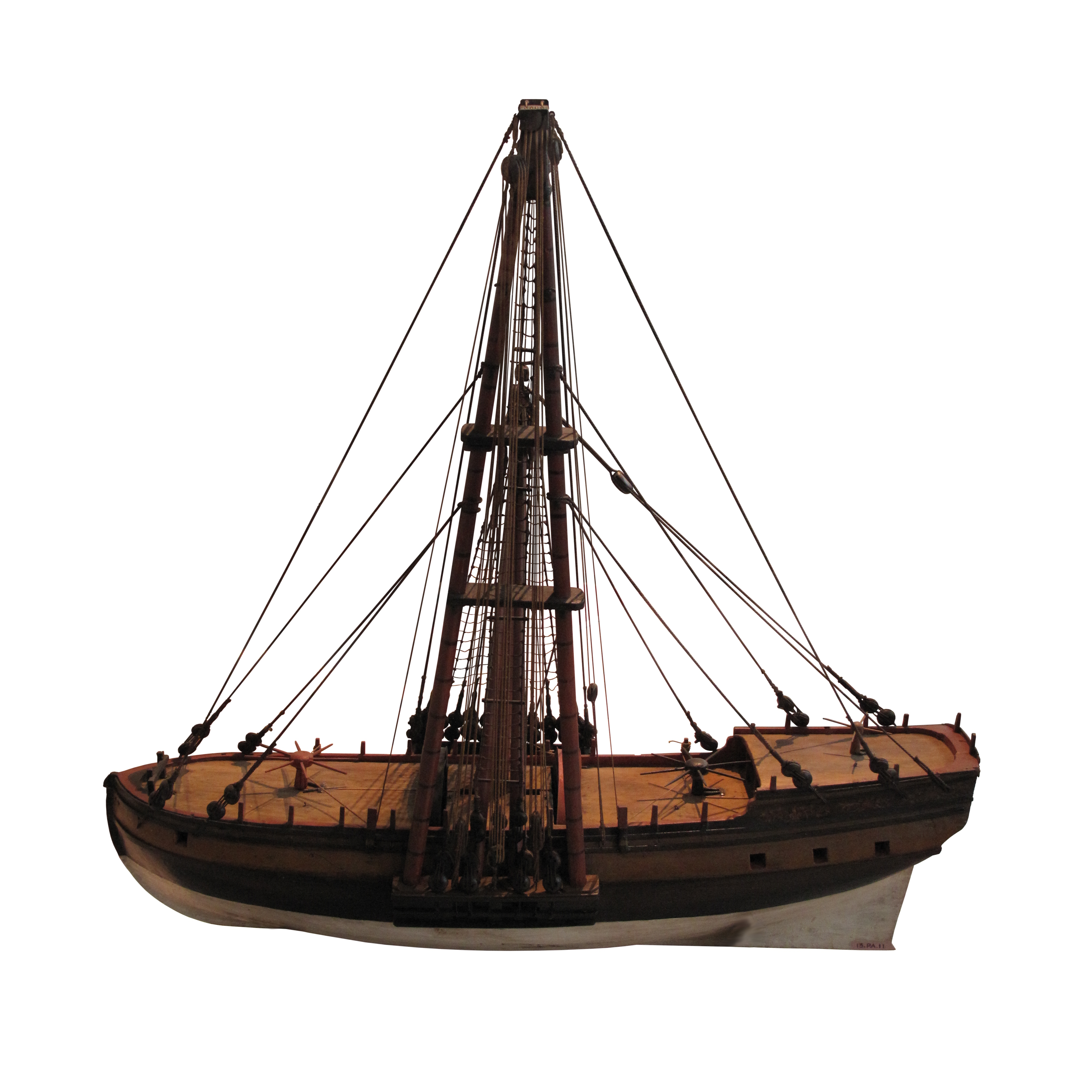
Entreprenant (1680) as a masting hulk

In addition to the naval vessels, a number of French privateers and other vessels have also borne the name.

== Privateers named Entreprenante ==
- Entreprenante: On 7 April 1694 HMS Ruby captured the privateer Entreprenante; the British Royal Navy took her into service as HMS Ruby Prize
- Entreprenant: On 13 March 1761, HMS Vengeance, under the command of Captain Gamaliel Nightingale, captured the 44-gun Entreprenant, which however was armed en flute with only 26 guns. Still, the capture was sanguinary for both sides.
- Entreprenante: On 2 December 1799 the British merchant ship Achilles captured the French privateer corvette Entreprenante, of 18 guns and 130–195 men, off San Domingo in an engagement that was particularly sanguinary for the French.
- Entreprenant: On 13 January 1808, HMS Pandora captured the French privateer Entreprenant, of 16 guns and 58 men, six or seven miles (9.7 or 11.3 km) south southeast of Folkestone, with the assistance of the hired armed cutter Active.

== Ships named Entreprenante ==
- Bayonnaise (1672), a barque, bore the name
- Entreprenante (1692), a 24-gun frigate, scuttled by fire at the Battle of Vigo Bay
- Entreprenante (1717), a longboat
- Entreprenante (1858), a steam storeship
