= Department of Electrical Services (Brunei) =

Electric utility company of Brunei

Department of Electrical Services Jabatan Perkhidmatan Elektrik

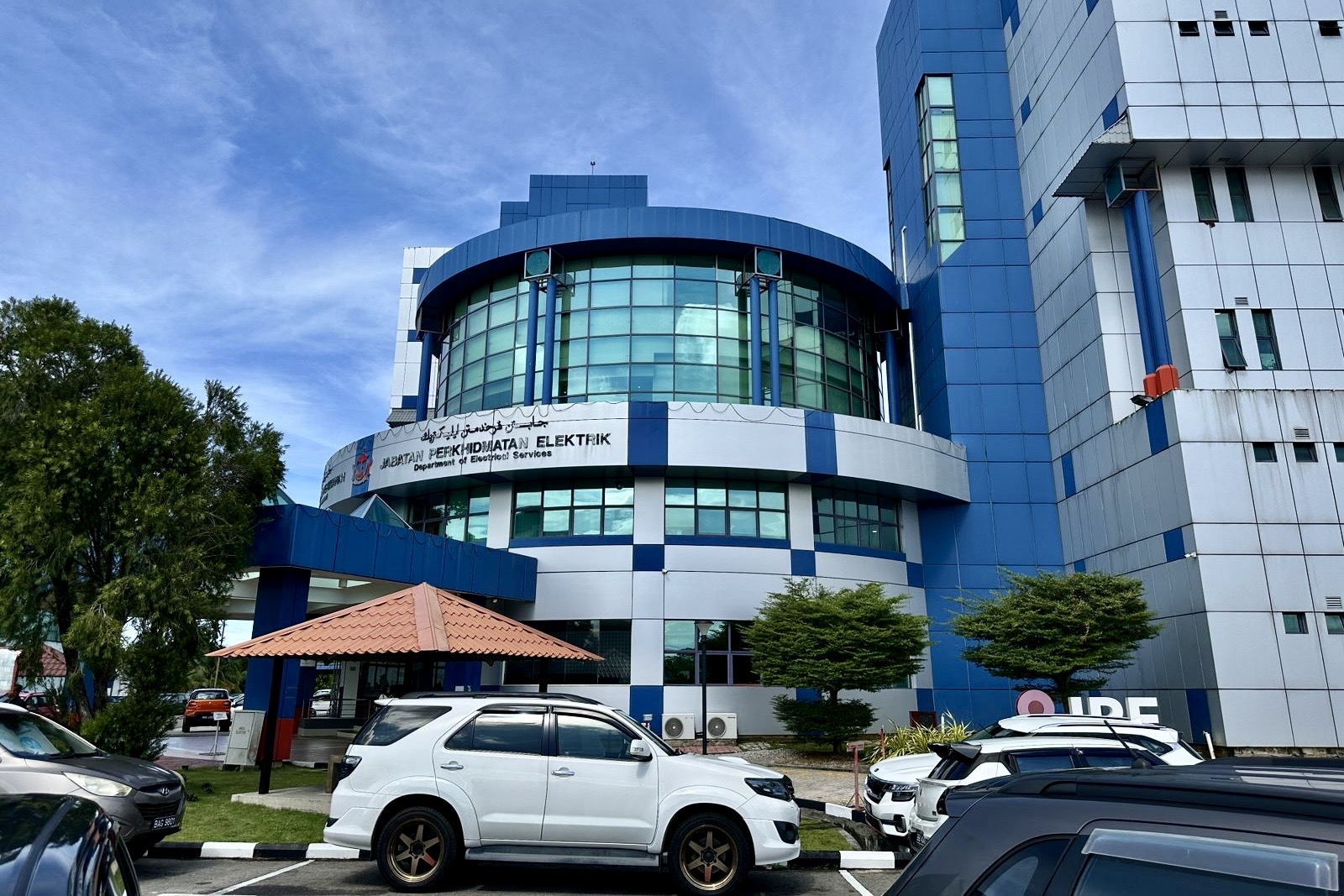
- DES' headquarters in Old Airport, Brunei
- Industry: electrical power
- Founded: 1921
- Headquarters: Bandar Seri Begawan, Brunei
- Area served: Brunei
- Products: electricity
- Services: electricity generation, electricity transmission and electricity distribution
- Website: Official website

The Department of Electrical Services (DES; Malay: Jabatan Perkhidmatan Elektrik) is an electric utility company in Brunei responsible for the generation, transmission and distribution of electricity to end users.

== History ==
DES was originally established as Electrical Office in 1921. In 1953, its name was changed to the Department of Electrical Services.

== Organisation chart ==
- Director
- Deputy Director
- Corporate Planning and Services
- Generation
- Revenue Management
- Customer Services
- Transmission and Distribution

http://www.des.gov.bn/SitePages/Organisation%20Structure.aspx

== Power stations ==
DES provides over 58% of the nation's electricity, mostly to residential areas, through the operation of four natural gas power plants (Gadong 1A, Gadong 2, Bukit Panggal, and Lumut) and one diesel power plant (Belingos). Together, DES and the Berakas Power Company (BPC) supply 889 MW of electrical power, of which DES provides 609 MW and BPC provides 280 MW. Serving key locations such government buildings and medical facilities, BPC provides 42% of the electricity and runs three significant natural gas stations (Berakas, Gadong 3, and Jerudong). General Electric turbine models are used by both DES and BPC; DES uses frame 5 and frame 6B turbines.

== See also ==
- Electricity sector in Brunei
