= Enterprise, McDonald County, Missouri =

Extinct hamlet in Missouri, U.S.

Coordinates: 36°40′20″N 94°36′31″W

Enterprise is an extinct town in McDonald County, in the U.S. state of Missouri.

A post office called Enterprise was established in 1850, and remained in operation until 1875. The community declined sometime after the Civil War.
