= HMS Enterprise (1705) =

Historic naval warship

History

France
- Name: L'Entreprise
- Commissioned: 1705
- Captured: By Royal Navy, 7 May 1705

Great Britain
- Name: HMS Enterprise
- Acquired: 1 June 1705
- Commissioned: 1705
- In service: 1705–1707
- Fate: Wrecked off Thornton, Lancashire, 12 October 1707

General characteristics
- Class & type: 24-gun sixth rate
- Tons burthen: 320 75/94 (bm)
- Length: 93 ft 0 in (28.3 m) gundeck; 79 ft 9 in (24.3 m) keel for tonnage
- Beam: 27 ft 6 in (8.4 m) for tonnage
- Depth of hold: 11 ft 5 in (3.5 m)
- Sail plan: Full-rigged ship
- Complement: 115
- Armament: 20 × 6-pdr guns on wooden trucks; 4 × 4-pdr guns on wooden trucks

HMS Enterprise (sometimes spelled Enterprize) was a 24-gun sixth-rate (named Enterprise or L'Entreprenante) of the French Navy captured by HMS Triton (also spelt as Tryton) on 7 May 1705. She was registered as a Royal Navy ship on 1 June 1705 and commissioned shortly afterwards. She served in the Mediterranean and with Admiral Byng's squadron at the Downs. She was wrecked in 1707 with the loss of all hands.

She was the first vessel in the Royal Navy to be named Enterprise.

== Specifications ==
She was captured on 2 May and registered as a Royal Naval vessel on 1 June 1705. Her gundeck was 93 feet 0 inches (28.3 metres) with her keel for tonnage calculation of 79 feet 9 inches (24.3 metres). Her breadth for tonnage was 27 feet 6 inches (8.4 metres). Her tonnage calculation was 320 75/94 tons. Her armament was twenty 6-pounders on the upper deck and four 4-pounders on the quarterdeck, all on wooden trucks.

== Commissioned service ==
She was commissioned in 1705 under the command of Commander John Paul, RN for service in the Mediterranean then was assigned to Admiral Byng's squadron for the winter of 1706/07 in the Downs. On 17 May 1707 Commander William Davenport assumed command.

== Loss ==
She was wrecked off Thornton, Lancashire, (near Blackpool) with the loss of all hands on 12 October 1707.
