= USS Enterprise =

USS Enterprise may refer to:

== United States Navy ==
=== Ships ===
- List of ships of the United States Navy named Enterprise
  - USS Enterprise (1775), a Continental Navy sloop captured from the British, burned to prevent recapture in 1777
  - USS Enterprise (1799), a schooner that fired the first shots in the First Barbary War
  - USS Enterprise (1831), a schooner, stationed primarily in South America to patrol and protect commerce
  - USS Enterprise (1874), a steam-powered sloop-of-war used for surveying, patrolling, and training until 1909
  - Enterprise (SP-790), a motorboat (1917–1919) used in World War I as a non-commissioned section patrol craft
  - USS Enterprise (CV-6), an aircraft carrier (1938–1947), the most decorated U.S. ship of World War II
  - USS Enterprise (CVN-65), the world's first nuclear-powered aircraft carrier (1961–2017)
  - USS Enterprise (CVN-80), a Gerald R. Ford-class aircraft carrier, under construction and scheduled to enter service by 2029

=== Training facility ===
- USS Enterprise (BLDG 7115), a building and ship simulator at the U.S. Navy training command in Great Lakes, Illinois

== Other American ships ==
- Enterprise (1776), a Continental Navy schooner, formerly a privateer, used in Chesapeake Bay as a convoy and patrol ship until 1777
- Enterprise (1814), a commercial steamboat that delivered supplies and troops during the Battle of New Orleans
- Enterprise (slave ship), a merchant vessel in the coastwise slave trade in the early 19th century
- Enterprise (yacht), a J-class yacht that won the 1930 America's Cup
- SS Flying Enterprise, an American cargo ship (1944–1952)
- USTS Enterprise (2003–2008), former name of TS Kennedy, a training ship at the Massachusetts Maritime Academy

== American aircraft and spacecraft ==
- Enterprise (balloon), a balloon used by the Union Army during the American Civil War
- Space Shuttle Enterprise (OV-101), the first orbiter built for NASA's Space Shuttle system
- IXS Enterprise, a NASA conceptual design for an interstellar ship, c. 2013
- VSS Enterprise (2009–2014), a Virgin Galactic commercial spaceplane that broke apart during a test flight

== Star Trek fictional spacecraft ==
- Starship Enterprise, a list and brief description of starships in the fictional history of Star Trek
- Enterprise (NX-01), the principal setting of Star Trek: Enterprise
- USS Enterprise (NCC-1701), the principal setting of the original Star Trek television series, refit for the first three Star Trek feature films and the prequel series Star Trek: Strange New Worlds
- USS Enterprise (NCC-1701-A), featured in the fourth through sixth Star Trek films using the same model as the USS Enterprise (NCC-1701) refit, albeit slightly modified
- USS Enterprise (NCC-1701-B), the opening setting of Star Trek: Generations
- USS Enterprise (NCC-1701-C), a starship in "Yesterday's Enterprise", an episode of Star Trek: The Next Generation
- USS Enterprise (NCC-1701-D), the principal setting of Star Trek: The Next Generation, the seventh Star Trek feature film, and the last two episodes of Star Trek: Picard
- USS Enterprise (NCC-1701-E), the principal setting of the eighth, ninth, and tenth Star Trek films
- USS Enterprise (NCC-1701-F), a starship under the command of Admiral Elizabeth Shelby, seen in Star Trek: Picard season 3
- USS Enterprise (NCC-1701-G), a starship under the command of Seven of Nine, seen in the Star Trek: Picard series finale "The Last Generation"
- USS Enterprise (NCC-1701-J), a starship depicted in a potential future in "Azati Prime", an episode of Star Trek: Enterprise
- USS Enterprise (NCC-1701-M), a starship replica of NCC-1701, designated a museum ship, in the video mini-series Star Trek: Of Gods and Men

== See also ==
- Enterprise-class gunboat
- Enterprise (disambiguation)
- HMS Enterprise, a list of ships of the British Royal Navy
