= List of ships of the United States Navy named Enterprise =

Eight ships used in the service of the United States or of the Colonial Forces of the United States Revolutionary War (six of which were United States Navy ships) have been named Enterprise with a ninth currently under construction:

Name	Class	Commissioned (or otherwise placed into service)	Decommissioned (or otherwise removed from service)	Fate
Enterprise (1775)	70-ton sloop-of-war	10 May 1775	7 July 1777	Burned to prevent capture, 7 July 1777. This ship was not a ship of the U.S. Navy. It was captured from the British and operated on Lake Champlain by Col Benedict Arnold of the Continental Army. The Continental Navy did not operate on Lake Champlain.
Enterprise (1776)	25-ton schooner	June 1776	February 1777	Returned to the Maryland Council of Safety in 1777. This Enterprise was also not a ship of the U.S. Navy. It was a privateer purchased for the Continental Navy.
Enterprise (1799)	135-ton schooner/brig	17 December 1799; April 1811	June 1809; 8 July 1823	This Enterprise was the first vessel of the United States Navy to carry the name. Fired the first shots in the First Barbary War against the Tripolitanian ship Tripoli. Broken up after being stranded on Little Curacao Island in the West Indies.
Enterprise (1831)	197-ton schooner	15 December 1831; 29 November 1839	12 July 1839; 24 June 1844	Sold, 28 October 1844.
Enterprise (1874)	615-ton barque screw sloop	16 March 1877; 12 January 1882; 4 October 1887; 8 July 1890	9 May 1880; 21 March 1886; 20 May 1890; 1 October 1909	Lent to Massachusetts Maritime Academy, 17 October 1892 – 4 May 1909. Sold, 1 October 1909.
Enterprise (SP-790)	66 ft (20 m) motor patrol boat	6 December 1917	2 August 1919	Transferred to the Bureau of Fisheries on 2 August 1919. This Enterprise was a privately owned motor boat purchased by the U.S. Navy for service as a non-commissioned patrol vessel. As a non-commissioned vessel the prefix "USS" would not have been included in the vessel's name.
USS Enterprise (CV-6)	Yorktown-class aircraft carrier	12 May 1938	17 February 1947	Served with unparalleled distinction in World War II, the most decorated ship of that war. Scrapped, 1 July 1958 – May 1960.
USS Enterprise (CVN-65)	Enterprise-class aircraft carrier	25 November 1961	3 February 2017	World's first nuclear-powered aircraft carrier. As of 2012, the U.S. Navy's longest-serving combat vessel, and third-oldest commissioned vessel after USS Constitution and USS Pueblo. Inactive since December 2012, some scrapping started in 2013 prior to official decommissioning on 3 February 2017.
USS Enterprise (CVN-80)	Gerald R. Ford-class aircraft carrier	Scheduled 2028		Announced by Secretary of the Navy Ray Mabus.

== See also ==
- USS Enterprise (BLDG 7115) – U.S. Navy training facility and simulator (2005–2011)
- USS Enterprise (disambiguation) – includes non-military ships, aircraft, and spacecraft named USS Enterprise
- HMS Enterprise – ships of the British Royal Navy named HMS Enterprise
- Enterprise (disambiguation) § Vessels – other vessels named Enterprise
