= USS Enterprise (CV-6) =

Yorktown-class aircraft carrier of the US Navy

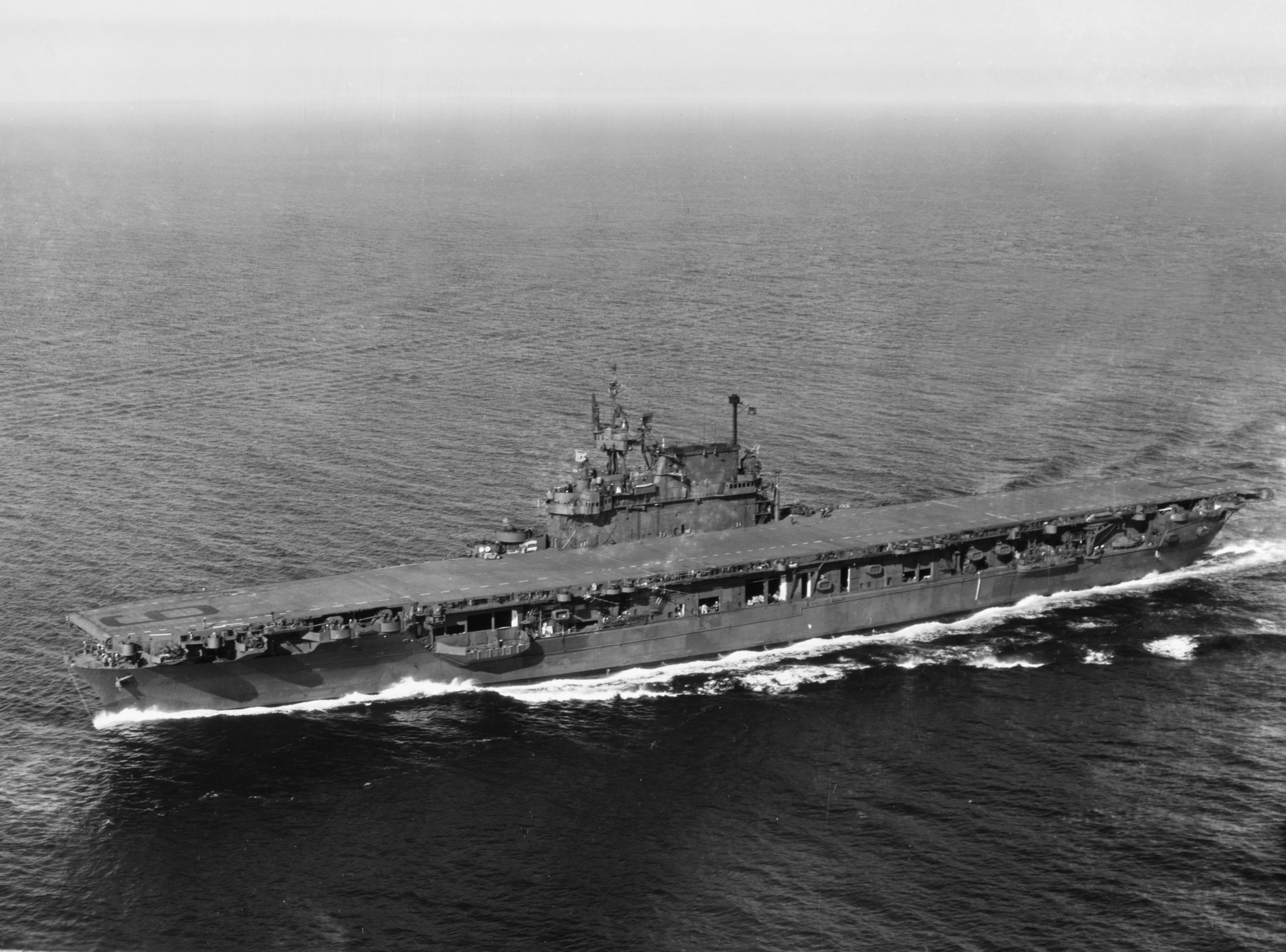
- Aerial view of Enterprise at sea in 1945

History

United States
- Name: USS Enterprise
- Ordered: 1933
- Builder: Newport News Shipbuilding
- Laid down: 16 July 1934
- Launched: 3 October 1936
- Commissioned: 12 May 1938
- Decommissioned: 17 February 1947
- Reclassified: CVA-6, 1 October 1952; CVS-6, 8 August 1953
- Stricken: 2 October 1956
- Identification: Hull number: CV-6
- Nickname(s): The Big E; Lucky E; The Grey Ghost; The Galloping Ghost
- Honors and awards: 20 battle stars; Presidential Unit Citation; Navy Unit Commendation British Admiralty Pennant
- Fate: Scrapped 1958–1960

General characteristics (as built)
- Class & type: Yorktown-class aircraft carrier
- Displacement: 19,800 tons standard; 25,500 tons full load; From October 1943: 21,000 tons standard; 32,060 tons full load
- Length: 761 ft (232.0 m) waterline; 809 ft 6 in (246.7 m) overall; From October 1943: 827 ft 5 in (252.2 m) overall length
- Beam: 83 ft 2 in (25.3 m) waterline; 108 ft 11 in (33.2 m) overall; From October 1943: 95 ft 5 in (29.1 m) waterline; 114 ft 2 in (34.8 m) overall width
- Draft: 25 ft 11.5 in (7.9 m)
- Installed power: 120,000 shp (89,484 kW); 9 × Babcock & Wilcox boilers
- Propulsion: 4 × shafts; 4 × Parsons geared steam turbines
- Speed: 32.5 knots (60.2 km/h; 37.4 mph)
- Range: 12,500 nmi (23,200 km; 14,400 mi) at 15 knots (28 km/h; 17 mph)
- Complement: 2,217 officers and men (1941)
- Sensors & processing systems: CXAM-1 RADAR; SK air-search radar; SM fire directional radar
- Armament: 8 × single 5 in/38 cal guns; 4 × quad 1.1 in/75 cal guns; 24 × .50 caliber machine guns; From April 1942: 8 × 5 in/38 cal; 4 × quad 1.1 in/75 cal; 30 × 20 mm Oerlikon cannons; From mid-June 1942 to mid-September 1942: 8 × 5 in/38 cal; 5 × quad 1.1 in/75 cal; 32 × 20 mm Oerlikons; From mid-September 1942: 8 × 5 in/38 cal; 4 × quad 40 mm Bofors guns; 1 × quad 1.1 in/75 cal; 44 × 20 mm Oerlikons (46 from 11/42); From October 1943: 8 × 5 in/38 cal; 40 × 40 mm Bofors (8×2, 6×4); 50 × 20 mm Oerlikon; From September 1945: 8 × 5 in/38 cal; 54 × 40 mm Bofors (5×2, 11×4); 32 × 20 mm Oerlikons (16×2)
- Armor: 2.5–4 in belt; 60 lb protective decks; 4 in bulkheads; 4 in side and 2 in top round conning tower; 4 in side over steering gear
- Aircraft carried: 96 aircraft maximum, 80-90 average on board
- Aviation facilities: 3 × elevators; 2 × flight deck hydraulic catapults; 1 × hangar deck hydraulic catapults

USS Enterprise (CV-6) was a Yorktown-class carrier built for the United States Navy during the 1930s. She was the seventh U.S. Navy vessel of that name. Colloquially called "The Big E", she was the sixth aircraft carrier of the United States Navy. Launched in 1936, she was the only Yorktown-class carrier to survive World War II. She was also one of only three American fleet carriers commissioned before the war to survive it; the others were Saratoga and Ranger .

Enterprise participated in more major actions of the war against Japan than any other United States ship. These actions included the attack on Pearl Harbor — 18 Douglas SBD Dauntless dive bombers of her air group arrived over the harbor during the attack; seven were shot down with eight airmen killed and two wounded, making her the only American aircraft carrier with men at Pearl Harbor during the attack and some of the first to sustain casualties during the Pacific War — the Battle of Midway, the Battle of the Eastern Solomons, the Battle of the Santa Cruz Islands, various other air-sea engagements during the Guadalcanal campaign, the Battle of the Philippine Sea, and the Battle of Leyte Gulf. Enterprise earned 20 battle stars, the most for any U.S. warship in World War II, and was the most decorated U.S. ship of World War II. She was also the first American ship to sink a full-sized enemy warship after the Pacific War had been declared when her aircraft sank the Japanese submarine I-70 on 10 December 1941. The Japanese destroyer Hayate (1925) was sunk the next day at Wake Island. On three occasions during the war, the Japanese announced that she had been sunk in combat, inspiring her nickname "The Grey Ghost". By the end of the war, her planes and guns had downed 911 enemy planes, sunk 71 ships, and damaged or destroyed 192 more.

Despite efforts made by the public after the war to turn Enterprise into a museum ship, Enterprise was scrapped from 1958 to 1960.

== Construction and commissioning ==
Enterprise in the James River after launching, 3 October 1936

The sixth carrier built for the United States Navy and the second of the Yorktown class, Enterprise was laid down on July 16, 1934 and launched on 3 October 1936 at Newport News Shipbuilding, sponsored by Lulie Swanson, wife of Secretary of the Navy Claude A. Swanson, and commissioned on 12 May 1938 with Captain Newton H. White, Jr. in command. Enterprise sailed south on a shakedown cruise which took her to Rio de Janeiro. Captain Charles A. Pownall relieved White on 21 December. After her return, she operated along the East Coast and in the Caribbean until April 1939, when she was ordered to duty in the Pacific.

== Service history ==
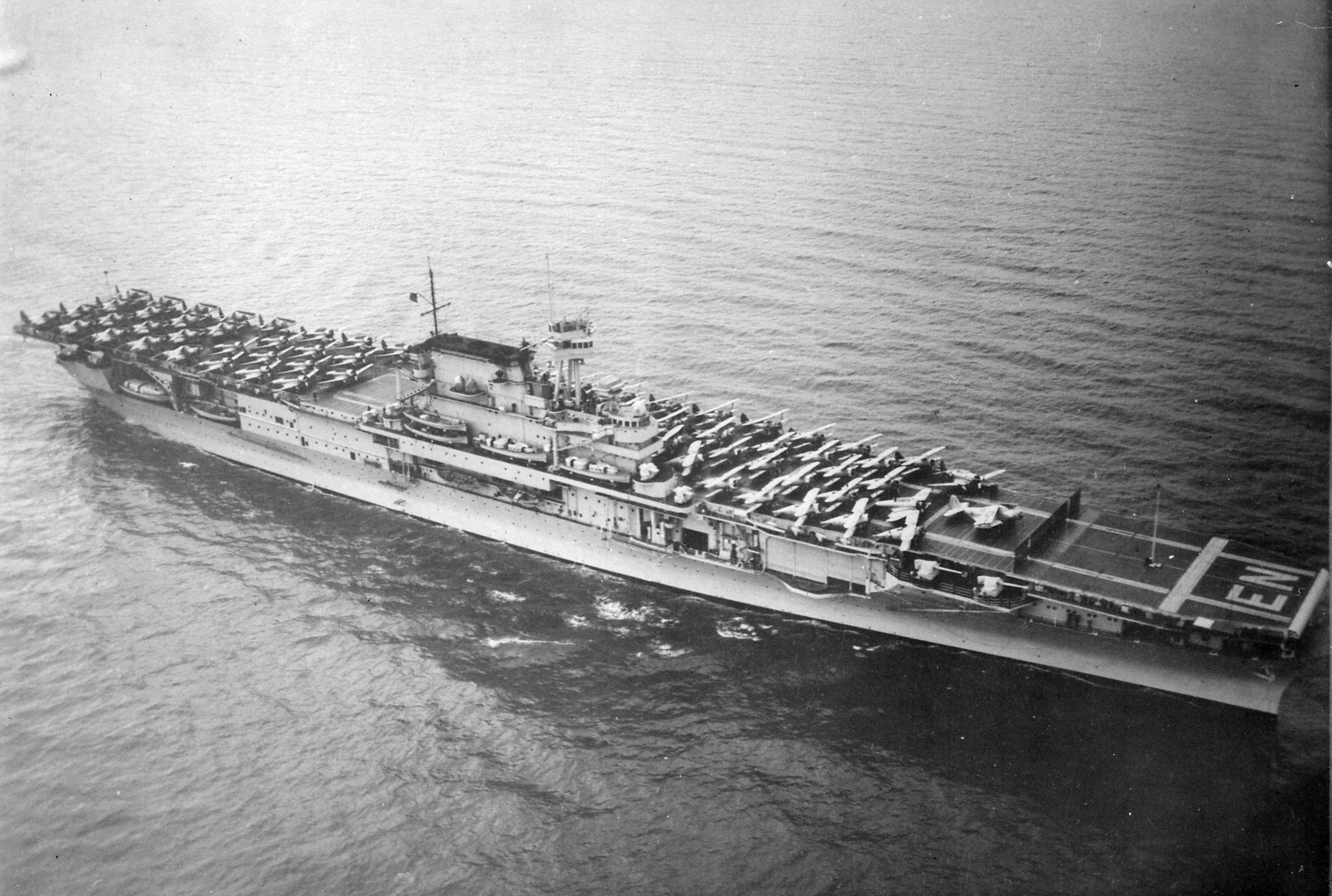
USS Enterprise in 1939

Enterprise was one of fourteen ships to receive the early RCA CXAM-1 radar. Captain George D. Murray assumed command of the carrier on 21 March 1941. Based first at San Diego (where she was used in the filming of Dive Bomber, starring Errol Flynn and Fred MacMurray) and then at Pearl Harbor on the Hawaiian island of Oahu after President Roosevelt ordered the Fleet to be "forward based", the carrier and her Air Group trained intensively and transported aircraft to American island bases in the Pacific. Enterprise and the other ships of Task Force 8 (TF 8) departed Pearl Harbor on 28 November 1941 to deliver Marine Fighter Squadron 211 (VMF-211) to Wake Island nearly 2,500 miles (4,000 km) due west. She was scheduled to return to Hawaii on 6 December 1941, but was delayed by the weather (which probably saved her from being sunk because the attack on Pearl Harbor was targeted not just at the battleships but mainly at US aircraft carriers) and she was still at sea about 215 nautical miles (398 km) west of Oahu at dawn on 7 December 1941.

=== World War II ===
==== Pearl Harbor ====
Enterprise launched eighteen of her SBDs - the CAG's aircraft, 13 aircraft from Scouting Squadron Six (VS-6) and four aircraft from Bombing Squadron Six (VB-6) - at dawn on 7 December to scout an arc extending from the northeast to southeast of the ship, and to land at Ford Island at Pearl Harbor after completing their search routes. As these aircraft arrived in pairs over Pearl Harbor, they were caught between attacking Japanese aircraft and defensive anti-aircraft fire from the ships and shore installations below. Seven SBDs were shot down, either from enemy action or friendly fire, with the loss of eight airmen killed and two wounded.

Enterprise received radio messages from Pearl Harbor reporting that the base was under attack, and she was later directed to launch an airstrike based on an inaccurate report of a Japanese carrier southwest of her location. The strike was launched around 17:00, consisting of six Grumman F4F Wildcat fighters of Fighting Squadron Six (VF-6), 18 Douglas TBD Devastator torpedo bombers of Torpedo Squadron Six (VT-6), and six SBDs of VB-6.

Unable to locate any targets, the torpedo and dive bombers returned to Enterprise, but the six fighters were directed to divert to Hickam Field on Oahu. Although word of the planes' expected arrival had been broadcast to all ships and anti-aircraft units in the area, the appearance of the Wildcats in the night sky over Oahu triggered panic firing, which shot down three of them, killing their pilots, while a fourth aircraft ran out of fuel, forcing the pilot to bail out.

Enterprise pulled into Pearl Harbor for fuel and supplies on the evening of 8 December. Vice-Admiral William Halsey Jr., commander of Carrier Division 2, ordered every able-bodied man on board to help rearm and refuel Enterprise; this process normally took 24 hours to complete, but was completed this time within seven hours. She and the other ships of TF 8 sailed early the next morning to patrol against possible additional attacks on the Hawaiian Islands. Although the group encountered no Japanese surface ships, Enterprise aircraft sank Japanese submarine I-70 at 23°45′N 155°35′W on 10 December 1941.

During the last two weeks of December 1941, Enterprise and her escorts steamed west of Hawaii to cover the islands while two other carrier groups made a belated attempt to relieve Wake Island. After a brief layover at Pearl Harbor, Enterprise and her group sailed on 11 January 1942, protecting convoys reinforcing Samoa.

On 16 January 1942, a TBD of VT-6, piloted by Chief Aviation Machinist's Mate and enlisted Naval Aviation Pilot Harold F. Dixon, got lost on patrol, ran out of fuel, and ditched. Dixon and his two crewmates, bombardier Anthony J. Pastula and gunner Gene Aldrich, survived for 34 days in a small rubber raft after their food and water were washed overboard, before drifting ashore on the atoll of Pukapuka, where the natives fed them and notified Allied authorities. The three men were then picked up by USS Swan. Dixon was awarded the Navy Cross for "extraordinary heroism, exceptional determination, resourcefulness, skilled seamanship, excellent judgment and highest quality of leadership."

On 1 February 1942, Enterprise's Task Force 8 raided Kwajalein, Wotje, and Maloelap in the Marshall Islands. In two waves, 64 airplanes attacked and for the loss of six of their number, sank only a small gunboat and damaged the light cruiser Katori, the minelayer Tokiwa, and five other ships. Also, numerous airplanes and ground facilities were destroyed. Enterprise received only minor damage in the Japanese counterattack, as TF 8 retired to Pearl Harbor.

The next month, Enterprise, now part of Task Force 16, swept the central Pacific, attacking enemy installations on Wake and Marcus Islands.

==== Doolittle Raid, April 1942 ====
After minor alterations and repairs at Pearl Harbor, Enterprise and TF 16 departed on 8 April 1942 to rendezvous with her sister ship Hornet and sailed west, escorting Hornet on the mission to launch 16 United States Army Air Forces North American B-25 Mitchells in the "Doolittle Raid" on Tokyo. While fighters from Enterprise flew combat air patrol, the B-25s launched on 18 April, and flew undetected the remaining 600 miles (1,000 km) to the target. The task force, its presence known to the enemy after a Japanese picket boat radioed a warning, reversed course and returned to Pearl Harbor on 25 April.

==== Battle of Midway, June 1942 ====
Five days later, Enterprise sortied toward the South Pacific to reinforce U.S. carriers operating in the Coral Sea. However, the Battle of the Coral Sea was over before Enterprise arrived. With Hornet, she performed a feint towards Nauru and Banaba (Ocean) islands which caused the Japanese to delay Operation RY to seize the two islands, Enterprise returned to Pearl Harbor on 26 May 1942, and began intensive preparation to meet the expected Japanese thrust at Midway Island.

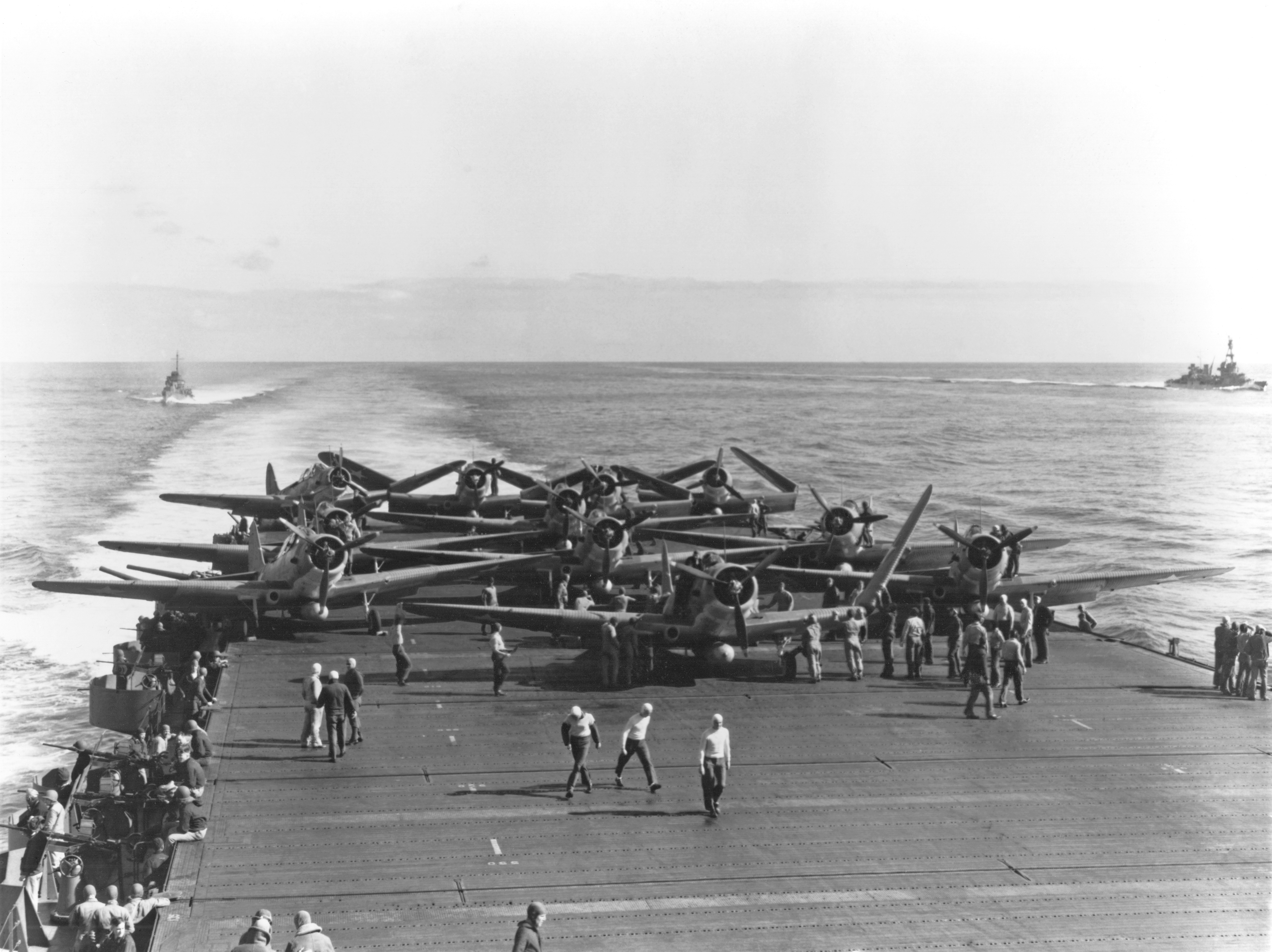
VT-6 TBDs on USS Enterprise during the Battle of Midway

On 28 May, Enterprise departed Pearl Harbor as Rear Admiral Raymond A. Spruance's flagship with orders "to hold Midway and inflict maximum damage on the enemy by strong attrition tactics". With Enterprise in TF 16 were Hornet, six cruisers, ten destroyers and four oilers. On 30 May, Task Force 17 (TF 17), with Rear Admiral Frank J. Fletcher in Yorktown, left Pearl Harbor with two cruisers and six destroyers and rendezvoused with TF 16; as senior officer present, Rear Admiral Fletcher became "Officer in Tactical Command". Vice Admiral Halsey, the usual commander of TF 16 and senior to both Fletcher and Spruance, was medically ordered to remain in a naval hospital at Pearl Harbor due to stress-induced severe weight loss and severe psoriasis.

Each side launched air attacks during the day in a decisive battle. Though the forces were in contact until 7 June, by 10:45 am on 4 June the outcome had been decided. Three Japanese carriers were burning and it was only a matter of time until a fourth was caught and knocked out. The Battle of Midway began on the morning of 4 June 1942, when four Japanese carriers, unaware of the presence of U.S. naval forces, launched attacks on Midway Island. Shortly after the first bomb fell on Midway, the first wave of planes (4 B-26B Marauders, 6 TBF-1 Avengers, 11 SB2U-3s, 16 SBDs and 15 B-17s) from Midway Island attacked unsuccessfully. Several more groups attacked, again failing to damage their targets. Planes from the U.S. carriers attacked next. Enterprise torpedo bombers attacked first, scoring no hits and suffering heavy losses. Soon after, Enterprise dive bombers attacked and disabled the Japanese carriers Kaga and Akagi, leaving them ablaze, while Yorktown aircraft also bombed the Japanese aircraft carrier Sōryū, leaving her burning and dead in the water.

Within an hour, the remaining Japanese carrier, Hiryu, launched air strikes that crippled Yorktown with three bombs and two torpedoes striking home during two separate attacks. In late afternoon, a mixed squadron of Enterprise and Yorktown bombers, flying from Enterprise, disabled Hiryu, leaving her burning. The following day Enterprise dive bombers alone sank the cruiser Mikuma. While Yorktown and Hammann were the only American ships sunk, TF 16 and TF 17 lost a total of 113 planes, 61 of them in combat. Japanese losses were much higher: four carriers (all scuttled), one cruiser and 272 carrier aircraft with many of their highly experienced aircrews. Despite losses to her aircraft squadrons, Enterprise came through undamaged and returned to Pearl Harbor on 13 June 1942.

==== South Pacific ====
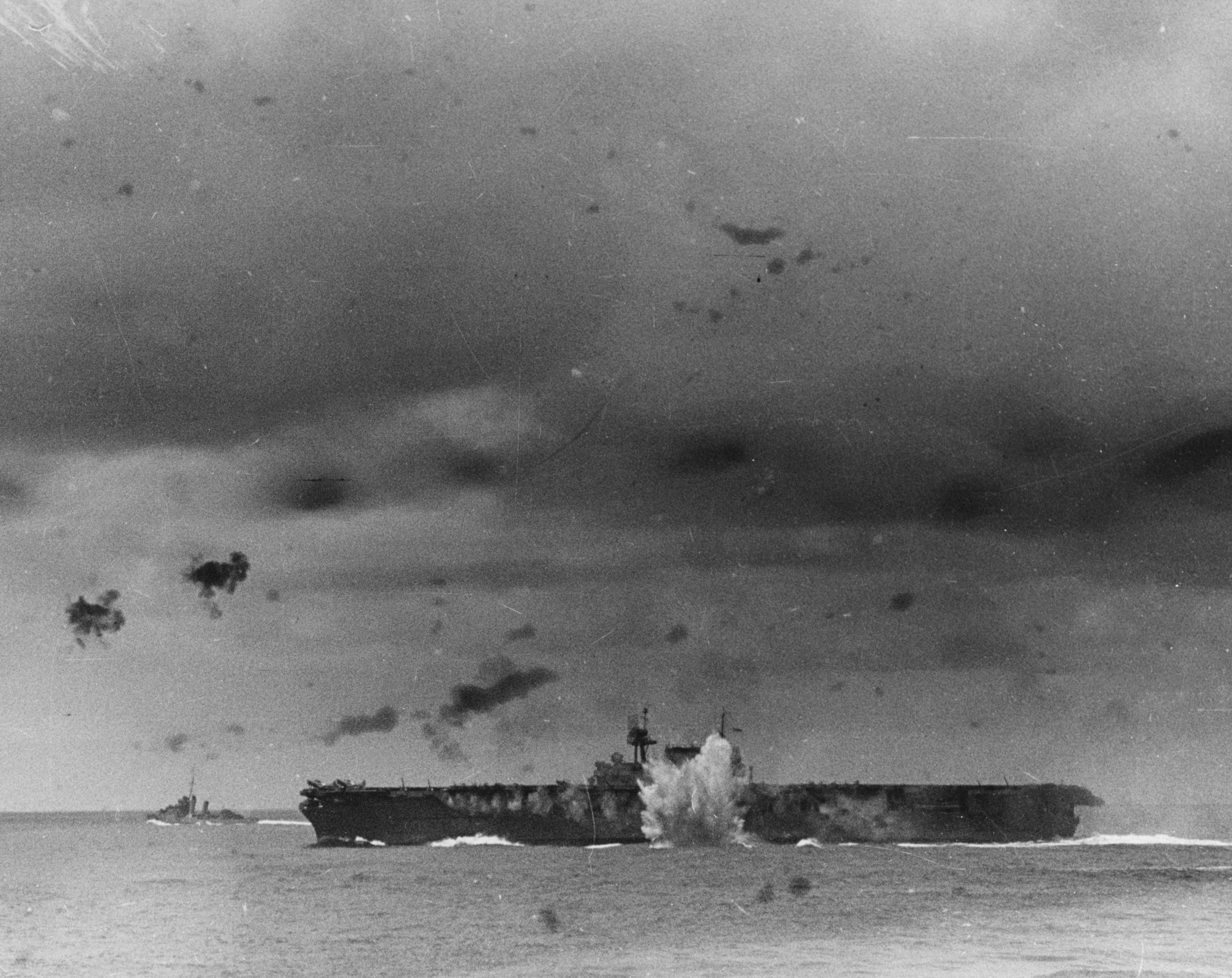
Near hit during the Battle of the Santa Cruz Islands, 26 October 1942

Captain Arthur C. Davis relieved Murray on 30 June 1942. After a month of rest and overhaul, Enterprise sailed on 15 July 1942 for the South Pacific, where she joined TF 61 to support the amphibious landings in the Solomon Islands on 8 August. For the next two weeks, the carrier and her planes guarded seaborne communication lines southwest of the Solomons. On 24 August, a strong Japanese force was discovered some 200 miles (300 km) north of Guadalcanal, and TF 61 sent planes to the attack. In the ensuing Battle of the Eastern Solomons, the light carrier Ryūjō was sunk, and the Japanese troops intended for Guadalcanal were forced back. Enterprise suffered the most heavily of the American ships; three direct bomb hits and four near misses killed 74, wounded 95, and inflicted serious damage on the carrier. Quick, hard work by damage control parties patched her up so that she was able to return to Hawaii under her own power.

Repaired at Pearl Harbor from 10 September–16 October 1942, Enterprise embarked Air Group 10 in early October. This was the first time that the Grim Reapers of VF-10 deployed from Enterprise under commanding officer James H. Flatley, who became known as "Reaper Leader". She departed once more for the South Pacific, where with Hornet she formed TF 61, although Captain Osborne Hardison relieved Davis on 21 October. Five days later, Enterprise scout planes located a Japanese carrier force and the Battle of the Santa Cruz Islands was under way. Enterprise aircraft struck carriers and cruisers during the struggle, while the ship herself underwent intensive attack. Hit twice by bombs, Enterprise lost 44 men and had 75 wounded. Despite serious damage, she remained in action and took on board a large number of planes and crewmen from Hornet when that carrier was sunk. Though the American losses of a carrier and a destroyer were more severe than the Japanese loss of one light cruiser, the battle gave the Americans time to reinforce Guadalcanal against the next enemy onslaught, and nearby Henderson Field was therefore secure from the Japanese bombardment. The loss of Hornet meant Enterprise was now the only functioning (albeit damaged) U.S. carrier in the Pacific Theater. (Note: Saratoga was undergoing repairs at Pearl Harbor after being torpedoed by a Japanese submarine, while Ranger (which had been judged unusable for combat operations in the Pacific) was still assigned to the Atlantic fleet, and remained so for the duration of the war.)

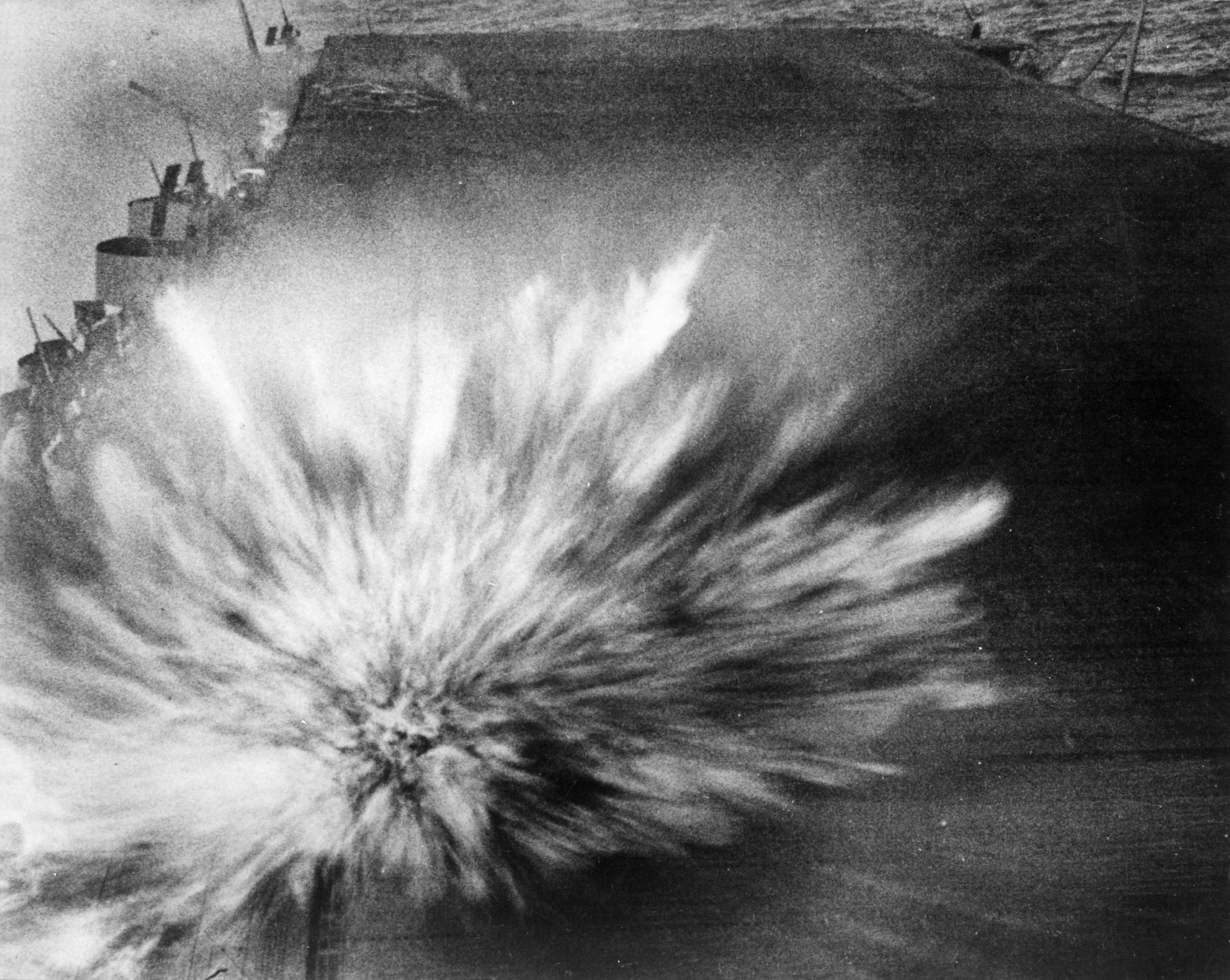
A Japanese bomb explodes on the flight deck of Enterprise on 24 August 1942, during the Battle of the Eastern Solomons, causing minor damage.

Enterprise reached Nouméa, New Caledonia on 30 October for repairs, but a new Japanese thrust at the Solomons demanded her presence and she sailed on 11 November, with repair crews from Vestal still working on board. Part of the repair crew were 75 Seabees from Company B of the 3rd Construction Battalion. This was due to a shortage of fleet repair resources. (Note: A Seabee battalion was made up of four construction companies and a headquarters company.) Underway with orders to engage the enemy, the Seabees focused on effecting repairs even during the forthcoming battle. The work was under the round-the-clock supervision of Enterprise's damage control officer, Lt. Cmdr. Herschel Albert Smith.

The commanding officer of Enterprise, Captain Osborne Bennett "Ozzie B" "Oby" Hardison, notified the Navy Department that "the emergency repairs accomplished by this skillful, well-trained, and enthusiastically energetic force have placed this vessel in condition for further action against the enemy." (Note: Captain Hardison was in command (21 October 1942 – 7 April 1943).) This remarkable job later won the praise of Vice Admiral William Halsey, Jr., Commander South Pacific Area and the South Pacific Force, who sent a dispatch to the OIC of the Seabee detachment stating, "Your commander wishes to express to you and the men of the Construction Battalion serving under you his appreciation for the services rendered by you in effecting emergency repairs during action against the enemy. The repairs were completed by these men with speed and efficiency. I hereby commend them for their willingness, zeal, and capability."

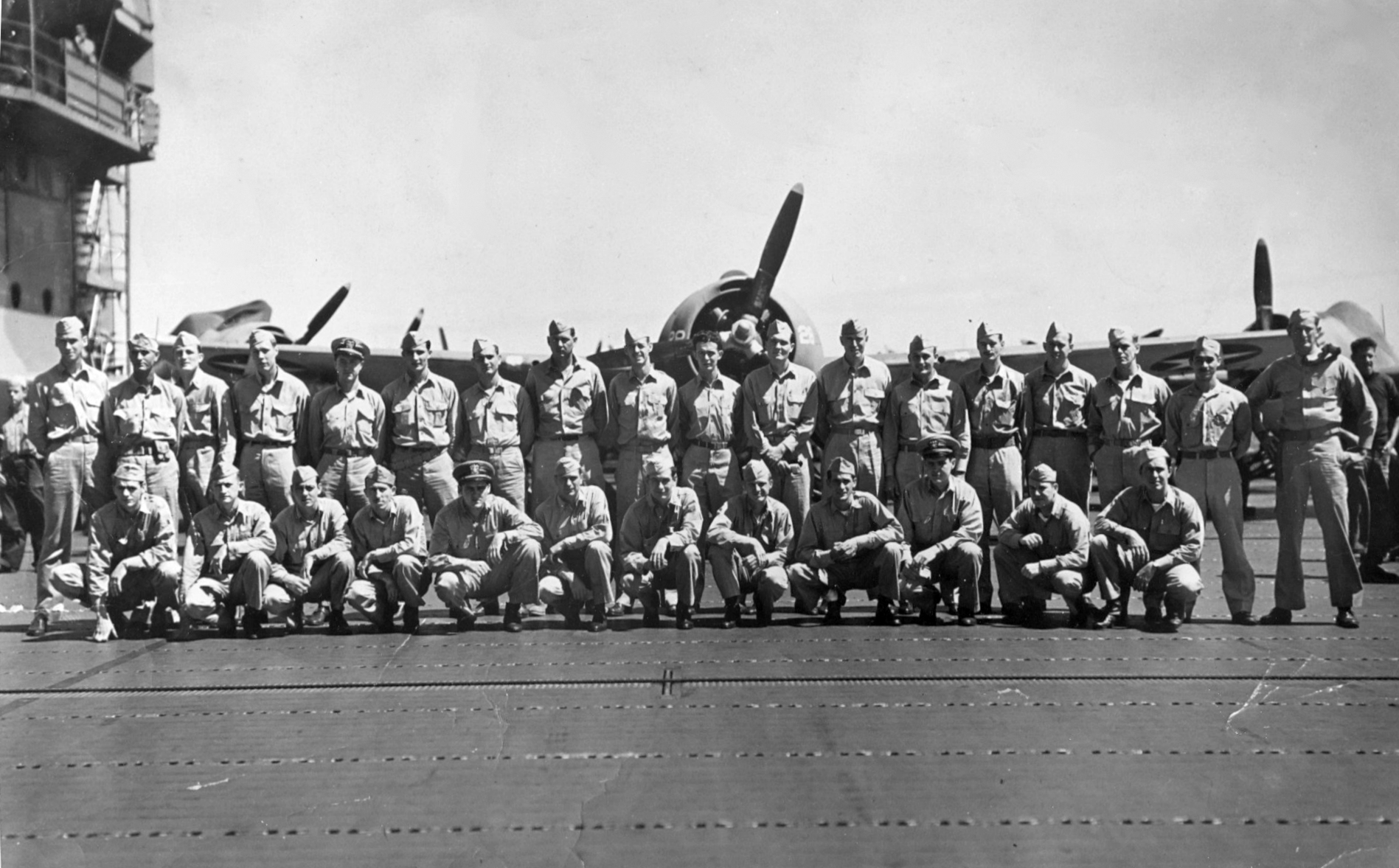
VF-3 pilots on Enterprise in June 1943

On 13 November, aviators from Enterprise helped to sink the Hiei, the first Japanese battleship lost during the war. Hiei was already crippled by numerous shells from American cruisers and destroyers the previous evening. Enterprise's Grumman TBF Avenger torpedo-bombers first struck Hiei., and after landing and rearming at Henderson Field, the Avengers found and attacked Hiei again and claimed three more torpedo hits. The combined attacks by both Enterprise's Avengers and American Army B-17 Flying Fortresses from Henderson Field inflicted a total of 5-8 torpedo hits and 7-8 500 lb and 1000 lb bomb hits on Hiei, in addition to the damage from the night surface battle, eventually prompting the Japanese to scuttle the stricken battleship. On 14 November, during the Naval Battle of Guadalcanal, Enterprise's Avengers and Dauntlesses, joined by USMC Avengers from Henderson Field, attacked the heavy cruiser Kinugasa on her return trip from an unopposed bombardment of Henderson Field the night before. At 09:36, a 500-pound bomb hit Kinugasa's 13.2 mm (0.5 in) machine gun mount in front of the bridge, starting a fire in the forward gasoline storage area. Captain Sawa and his executive officer were killed by the bomb, and Kinugasa gradually began to list to port. Near-misses caused additional fires and flooding and a second attack by 17 more Dauntlesses knocked out Kinugasa's engines and rudder and opened more compartments to the sea. At 11:22, Kinugasa capsized and sank southwest of Rendova Island at 08°45′S 157°00′E, taking 511 crewmen with her.

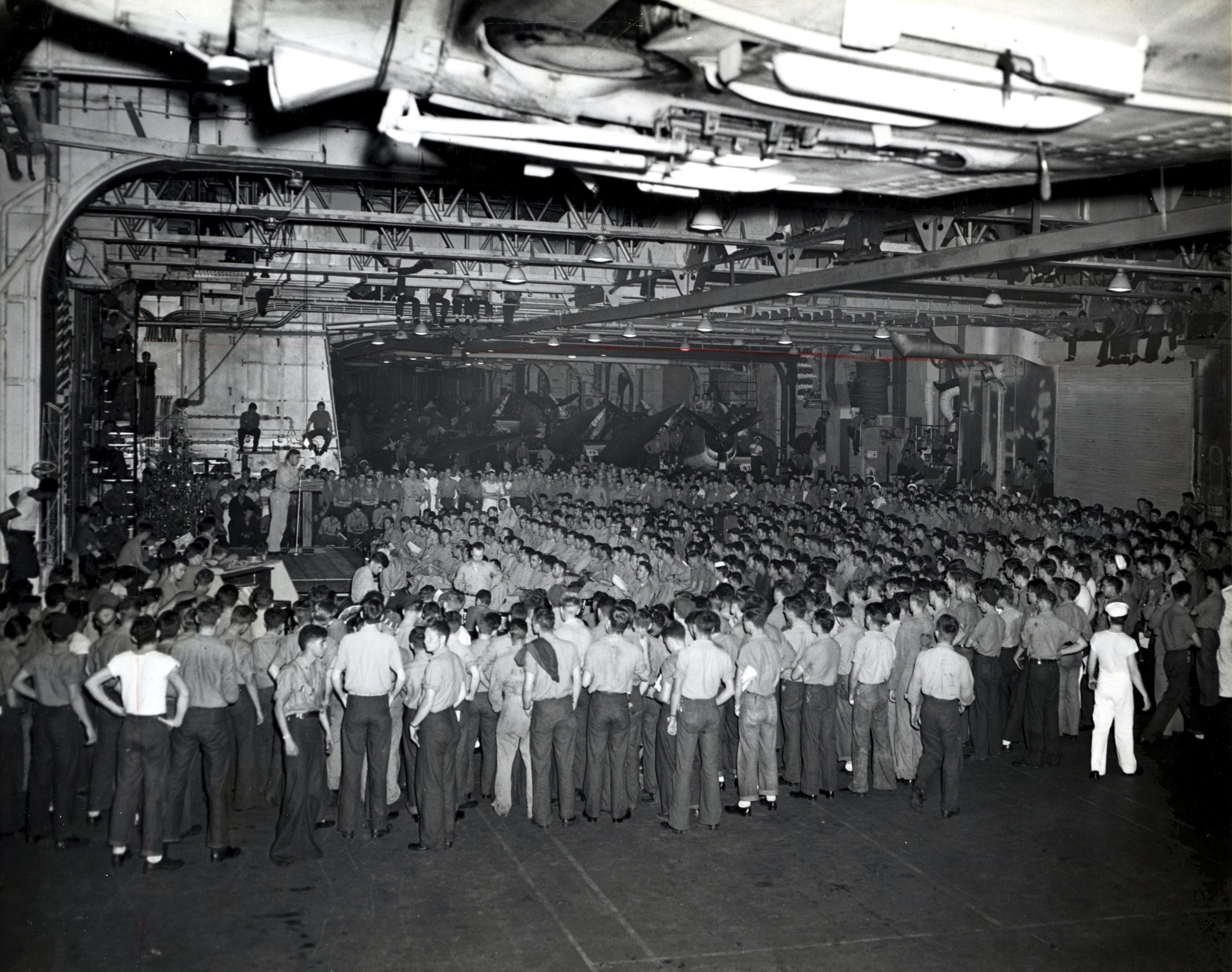
Sailors in the hangar of Enterprise in December 1943

When the Naval Battle of Guadalcanal ended on 15 November 1942, Enterprise had shared in sinking 16 ships and damaging eight more. The carrier returned to Nouméa on 16 November to complete her repairs.

Sailing again on 4 December, Enterprise trained out of Espiritu Santo, New Hebrides, until 28 January 1943, when she departed for the Solomons area. On 30 January, her fighters flew combat air patrol for a cruiser–destroyer group during the Battle of Rennell Island. Despite the destruction of most of the attacking Japanese bombers by Enterprise planes, the heavy cruiser Chicago was sunk by aerial torpedoes.

Detached after the battle, the carrier arrived at Espiritu Santo on 1 February, and for the next three months operated out of that base, covering U.S. surface forces up to the Solomons. Captain Samuel Ginder assumed command of the ship on 16 April. Enterprise then steamed to Pearl Harbor where, on 27 May 1943, Admiral Chester Nimitz presented the ship with the first Presidential Unit citation awarded to an aircraft carrier.

In the summer of 1943, with the new Essex-class and Independence-class carriers joining the American Pacific Fleet, Enterprise was temporarily relieved of duty, and on 20 July, she entered Puget Sound Naval Shipyard for a much-needed overhaul. Over the course of several months, Enterprise received an extensive refit, which included, among other upgrades, new anti-aircraft weapons and an anti-torpedo blister that significantly improved her underwater protection. (Note: During the first year of the war, all of Enterprise's sister ships (Hornet and Yorktown, as well as the similar but smaller carrier Wasp), were sunk by torpedoes, making Enterprise the sole class survivor.) This mid-war refit is where she would receive her two iconic "6"s on her flight decks.

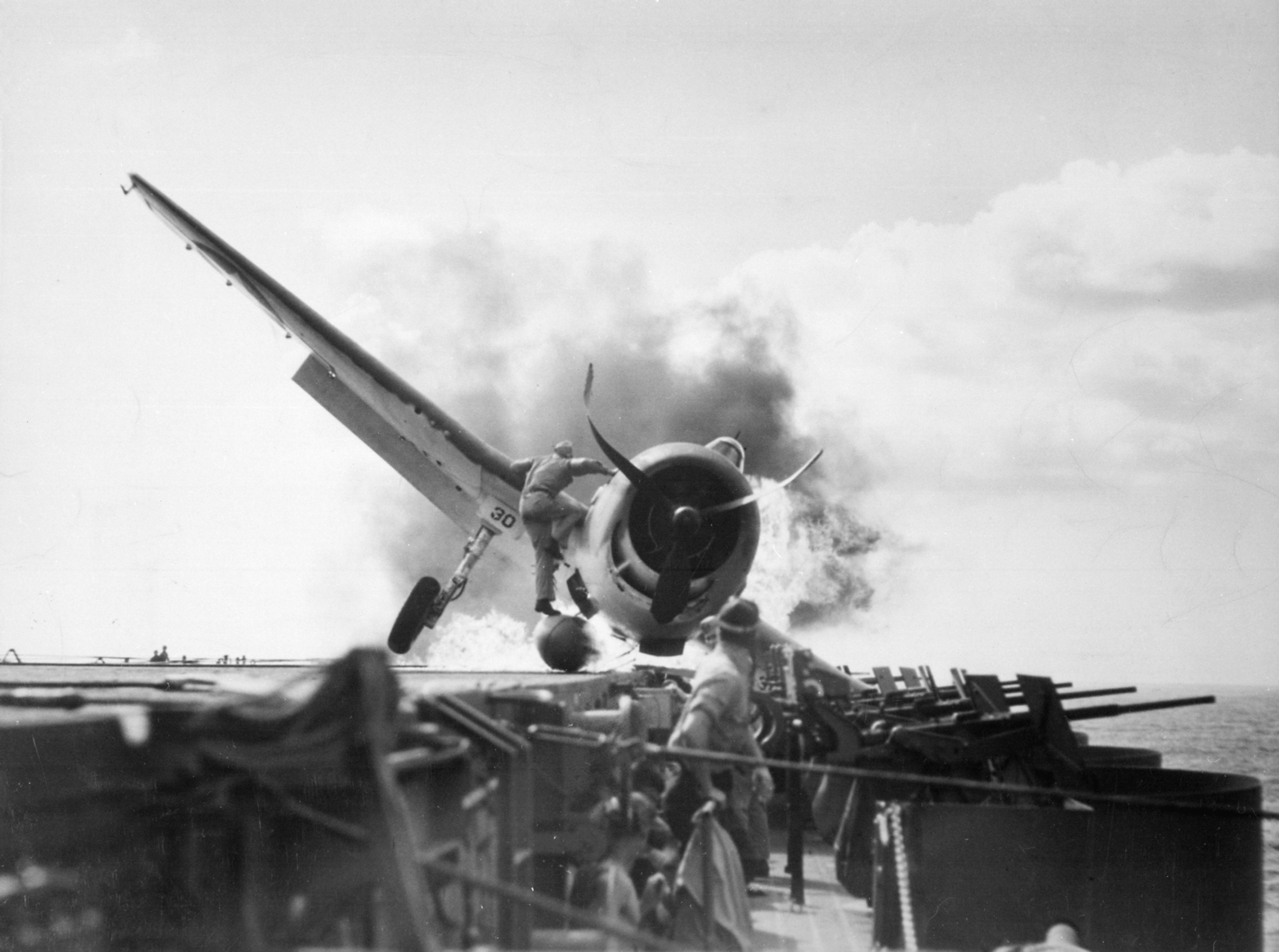
En route to attack Makin Island on 10 November 1943, this Grumman F6F Hellcat (VF-2) crash landed on Enterprise's flight deck.

=== Return to duty ===
Captain Matthias Gardner relieved Ginder on 7 November. Back at Pearl Harbor on 6 November, Enterprise left four days later to provide close air support to the 27th Infantry Division landing on Makin Atoll, during the Battle of Makin, from 19–21 November 1943. On the night of 26 November, Enterprise introduced carrier-based night fighters to the Pacific when a three-plane team from the ship broke up a large group of land-based bombers attacking TG 50.2. Two of the three planes returned to the ship, with LCDR Edward "Butch" O'Hare the only casualty. After a heavy strike by aircraft of TF 50 against Kwajalein on 4 December, Enterprise returned to Pearl Harbor five days later.

The carrier's next operation was with the Fast Carrier Task Force in softening up the Marshall Islands and supporting the landings on Kwajalein, from 29 January-3 February 1944. Then, Enterprise sailed, still with TF 58, to strike the Japanese naval base at Truk Lagoon in the Caroline Islands, on 17 February. Again Enterprise made aviation history, when she launched the first night radar bombing attack from a U.S. carrier. The twelve torpedo bombers in this strike achieved excellent results, accounting for nearly one-third of the 200,000 tons of shipping destroyed by aircraft.

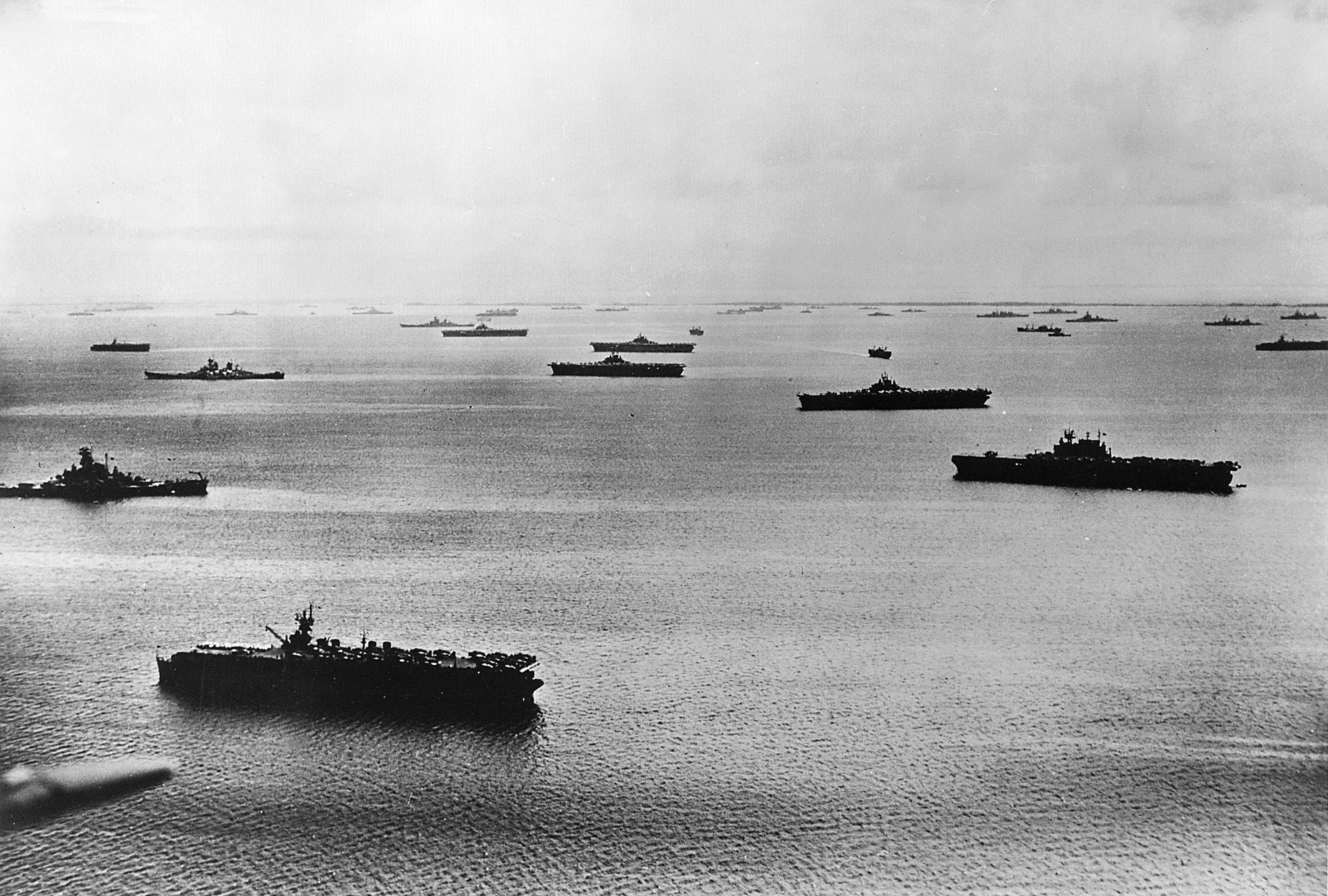
Enterprise on the right with the Fifth Fleet at Majuro, 1944

Detached from TF 58 with escorts, Enterprise launched raids on Jaluit Atoll on 20 February, then steamed to Majuro and Espiritu Santo. Sailing on 15 March in TG 36.1, she provided air cover and close support for the landings on Emirau Island (19–25 March). The carrier rejoined TF 58 on 26 March, and for the next 12 days, joined in a series of strikes against the islands of Yap, Ulithi, Woleai, and Palau. After a week's rest and replenishment at Majuro, Enterprise sailed on 14 April to support landings in the Hollandia (currently known as Jayapura) area of New Guinea, and then hit Truk again from 29 to 30 April.

On 6 June 1944, she and her companions of TG 58.3 sortied from Majuro to join the rest of TF 58 in attacking the Marianas Islands. Striking Saipan, Rota, and Guam from 11 to 14 June, Enterprise pilots gave direct support to the landings on Saipan on 15 June, and covered the troops ashore for the next two days.

Aware of a major Japanese attempt to break up the invasion of Saipan, Admiral Spruance, now Commander 5th Fleet, positioned TF 58 to meet the threat.

==== Battle of the Philippine Sea ====
On 19 June 1944, Enterprise was one of four carriers of Task Group 58.3 under the command of Rear Admiral John W. Reeves during the largest carrier aircraft battle in history: the Battle of the Philippine Sea. For over eight hours, airmen of the United States and Imperial Japanese navies fought in the skies over TF 58 and the Marianas. Over the course of two days, a total of six American ships were damaged, and 130 planes and a total of 76 pilots and aircrew were lost. In sharp contrast, American carrier aircraft, with a major assist from U.S. submarines, sank three Japanese carriers (Hiyō, Shōkaku, and Taihō), and destroyed 426 carrier aircraft, losses from which Japanese naval aviation would never recover.

Enterprise participated both in the defense of the fleet and in the subsequent early-evening strike against the Japanese task forces. During the chaotic after-dark recovery of the air strike, a fighter and a bomber came aboard simultaneously, but did not cause an accident. A planned midnight strike against the Japanese fleet by night-flying Enterprise pilots was cancelled because of the recovery and rescue operations required after the dusk attack. After the battle, Enterprise and her Task Group continued to provide air support for the invasion of Saipan through 5 July. She then sailed for Pearl Harbor and a month of rest and overhaul, during which she was painted in Measure 33/4Ab Dazzle camouflage. During this time, Gardner was replaced by Commander Thomas Hamilton on 10 July before he was relieved in his turn by Captain Cato Glover on 29 July. Back in action on 24 August, the carrier sailed with TF 38 in that force's aerial assault on the Volcano and Bonin Islands from 31 August – 2 September, and Yap, Ulithi, and the Palaus from 6–8 September.

=== Battle of Leyte Gulf ===
After operating west of the Palau Islands, Enterprise joined other units of TF 38 on 7 October and set course to the north. From 10 to 20 October, her aviators flew over Okinawa, Formosa, and the Philippines, blasting enemy airfields, shore installations, and shipping in preparation for the assault on Leyte. After supporting the Leyte landings on 20 October, Enterprise headed for Ulithi to replenish, but the approach of the Japanese fleet on 23 October called her back to action.

On 24 October 1944, at 9:18, 27 aircraft from Enterprise and the aircraft carrier USS Franklin attacked Vice Admiral Shōji Nishimura's Southern Force consisting of 2 battleships, 1 heavy cruiser, 1 light cruiser, and 8 destroyers. Enterprise fighters singled out the battleship Yamashiro and killed 20 sailors with strafing and rocket attacks, while a bomb's near miss damaged the hull and flooded the starboard bilge causing the ship to list by almost 15 degrees until counter-flooding in the port bilge righted the ship. Enterprise planes also hit the battleship Fusō, with one bomb destroying the catapult and both floatplanes, while another bomb hit the ship near Turret No. 2 and penetrated the decks, killing everyone in No. 1 secondary battery; the ship began to list to starboard. Enterprise planes then hit the destroyer Shigure with a bomb to her bridge which killed 5 sailors and finally conducted strafing runs on the heavy cruiser Mogami. In the meantime, Franklin's air group sank the destroyer Wakaba before the American aircraft returned to the fleet.

Later in the day, Enterprise joined the other carriers of TF-38 in attacking Admiral Takeo Kurita's Center Force of 5 battleships, 7 heavy cruisers, 2 light cruisers, and 13 destroyers in the Sibuyan Sea. Her air group singled out the Japanese "super battleship" Musashi - one of the two largest and most powerful battleships in the world alongside her sistership Yamato - which had already tanked 9 torpedo hits, 2 bomb hits, and 9 damaging bomb near misses from USS Intrepid, Essex, and Lexington aircraft. Musashi was heavily down by the bow and struggling along at 20 knots but showed no signs of stopping yet. Nine Enterprise Avengers attacked the battleship and nailed her with four 1,000-pound (450 kg) bomb hits, three of which penetrated the bow and killed Musashi's entire forward damage control team, while the fourth wrecked the chief steward's office. Right afterwards, eight Enterprise Avengers executed a pincer attack and landed three torpedo hits. The first two hit the bow on both sides, while the third hit amidships underneath her funnel and flooded her third machinery space and further dropped Musashi's speed to 13 knots. Afterwards, Musashi was additionally hit by at least another 6 torpedoes and 11 bombs from the aircraft carriers Lexington, Intrepid, and Franklin and the light carrier USS Cabot. Musashi sank over 10 hours with the loss of 1,023 men.

The day afterwards, Enterprise joined TF-38 aircraft in attacking Admiral Ozawa's decoy aircraft carrier force during the battle off Cape Engaño. Between 13:00 to 13:30, a large number of aircraft from Enterprise, Essex, Franklin, and the light carriers USS Langley and USS San Jacinto singled out the Japanese light carrier Zuihō and mangled her with close to 70 damaging bomb near misses alongside two torpedo hits to her bow and stern to starboard and two 500-pound high explosive bomb hits to her stern that exploded in her aft fight deck and x-ray room. Bomb fragments cut steam pipes and flooded the starboard engine room, before flooding her 2nd boiler and port engine room as well. Zuiho's speed dropped to 12 knots and she slowly lost speed before going dead in the water by 14:45. The crippled Zuihō was finally attacked by a wave of aircraft from Lexington and Langley which landed nearly a dozen more damaging near misses that delivered the Coup De Grace, and the light carrier sank by the stern at 15:26 with the loss of 215 men. Later at 16:30, Enterprise attacked the battleship Hyūga and the destroyer Shimotsuki and damaged both vessels with bomb near misses. Shimotsuki developed an oil leak that dropped her speed to 31 knots and lost her aft radar, AA director, and the life of one sailor.

Finally during the afternoon of the 27th, a squadron of Enterprise dive bombers located the destroyer Shiranui off Semilara Island, which had been detached to assist the crippled destroyer Hayashimo which had beached herself after being torpedoed by US carrier aircraft a day earlier. At 13:30, one bomb hit Shiranui amidships and started a massive fire, followed by an equally massive explosion which split the destroyer in half and sank Shiranui with no survivors. Hayashimo herself was then destroyed by Essex dive bombers, with some 200 survivors abandoning the hulk.

Enterprise remained on patrol east of Samar and Leyte until the end of October, then retired to Ulithi for supplies. During November, her aircraft struck targets in the Manila area, and at the island of Yap. She returned to Pearl Harbor on 6 December 1944 and Glover was replaced by Captain Grover B. H. Hall on 14 December.

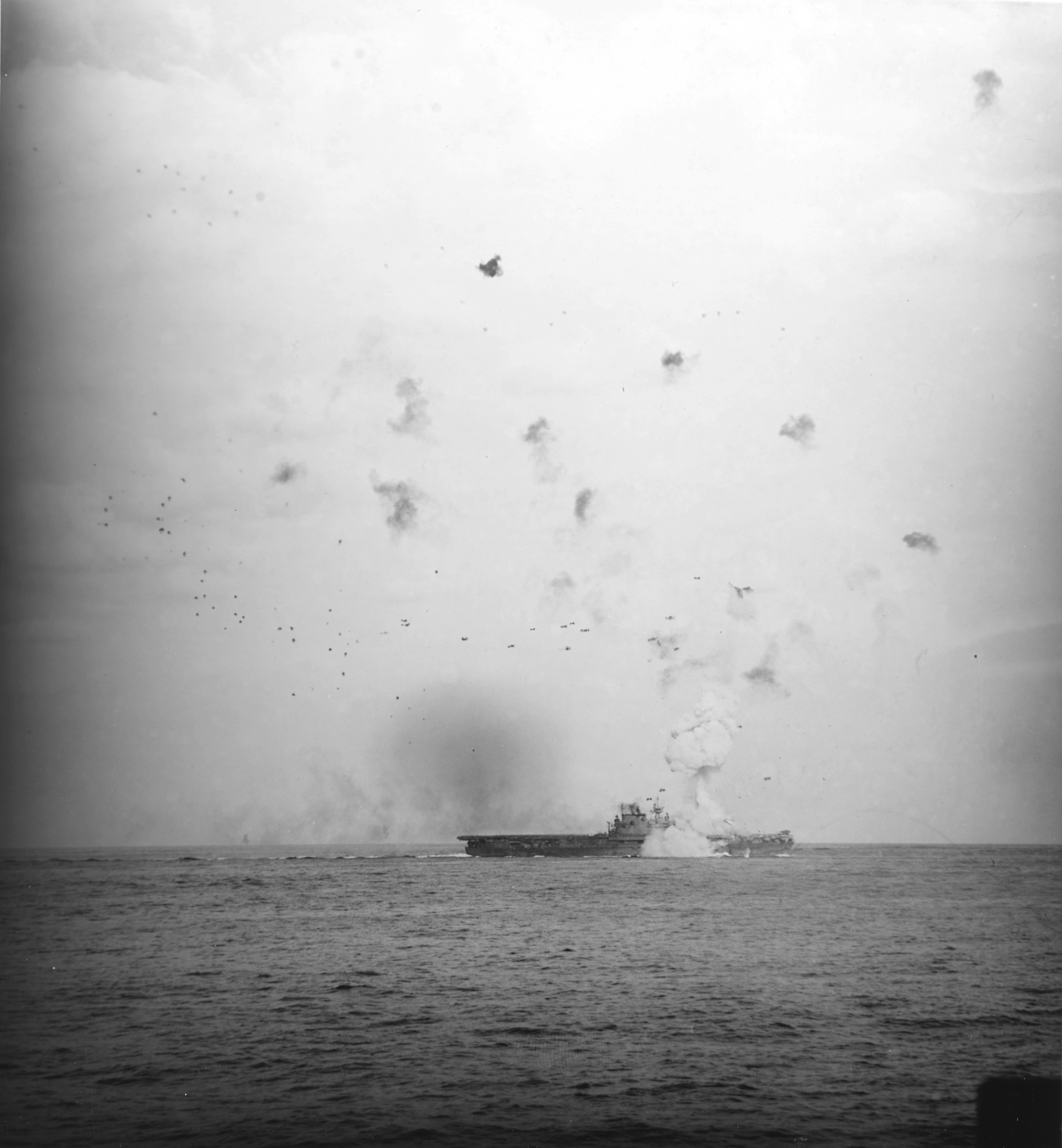
A photo taken from the light carrier Bataan shows an explosion on Enterprise from a bomb-laden kamikaze. The ship's forward elevator was blown approximately 400 feet (120 m) into the air from the force of the explosion six decks below.

==== Luzon and Tokyo ====
Sailing on 24 December for the Philippines, Enterprise carried an air group specially trained in night carrier operations; as the only carrier capable of night operations, it left Oahu with its hull code changed from CV to CV(N), the "N" representing "Night". it joined TG 38.5 and swept the waters north of Luzon and of the South China Sea during January 1945, striking shore targets and shipping from Formosa to Indo-China including an attack on Macau. After a brief visit to Ulithi, Enterprise joined TG 58.5 alongside all four Iowa Class Battleships, (USS Iowa (BB-61) Joined January 1944, USS New Jersey (BB-62) Joined January 1944, USS Missouri (BB-63)Joined January 1945, and USS Wisconsin (BB-64) Joined February 1945) on 10 February 1945, and provided day and night combat air patrol for TF 58 as it struck Tokyo on 16–17 February.

==== Iwo Jima ====
She then supported the Marines in the Battle of Iwo Jima from 19 February – 9 March, when she sailed for Ulithi. During one part of that period, Enterprise kept aircraft aloft continuously over Iwo Jima for 174 hours.

==== Okinawa ====
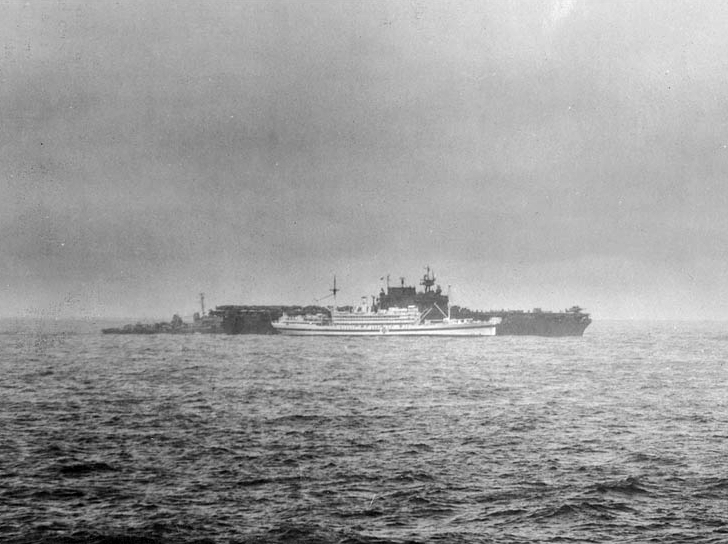
Enterprise transferring casualties to the hospital ship Bountiful after a kamikaze strike the previous day, 15 May 1945

Departing Ulithi on 15 March, the carrier continued her night work in raids against Kyūshū, Honshū, and shipping in the Inland Sea of Japan. Damaged lightly by an enemy bomb on 18 March, Enterprise entered Ulithi six days later for repairs. Back in action on 5 April, she supported the Okinawa operation until she was damaged on 11 April—this time by a kamikaze—and was forced back to Ulithi. Off Okinawa once more on 6 May, Enterprise flew patrols around the clock as kamikaze attacks increased. On 14 May 1945, she suffered her last wound of World War II when a kamikaze Zero, piloted by Lt. J.G. Shunsuke Tomiyasu, destroyed her forward elevator, killing 14 and wounding 68.

The carrier sailed for the Puget Sound Navy Yard, where she underwent repairs and an overhaul from 12 June-31 August 1945. The war ended with the Japanese surrender on 2 September 1945.

=== Aviation complement ===
The following aviation complement was disembarked from Enterprise on 7 September 1945 at NAS Barber's Point;

- United States Pacific Fleet - Navy Carrier Air Group 52 (CVGN-52) - NYD SEATTLE 1x Grumman F6F-5 Hellcat - ship's flight
  - VFN-52 - 22x F6F-5 + 15x F6F-5P
  - VTN-52 (torpedo bomber squadron) - 16x General Motors TBM-3E Avenger

=== Post war ===
==== Operation Magic Carpet ====
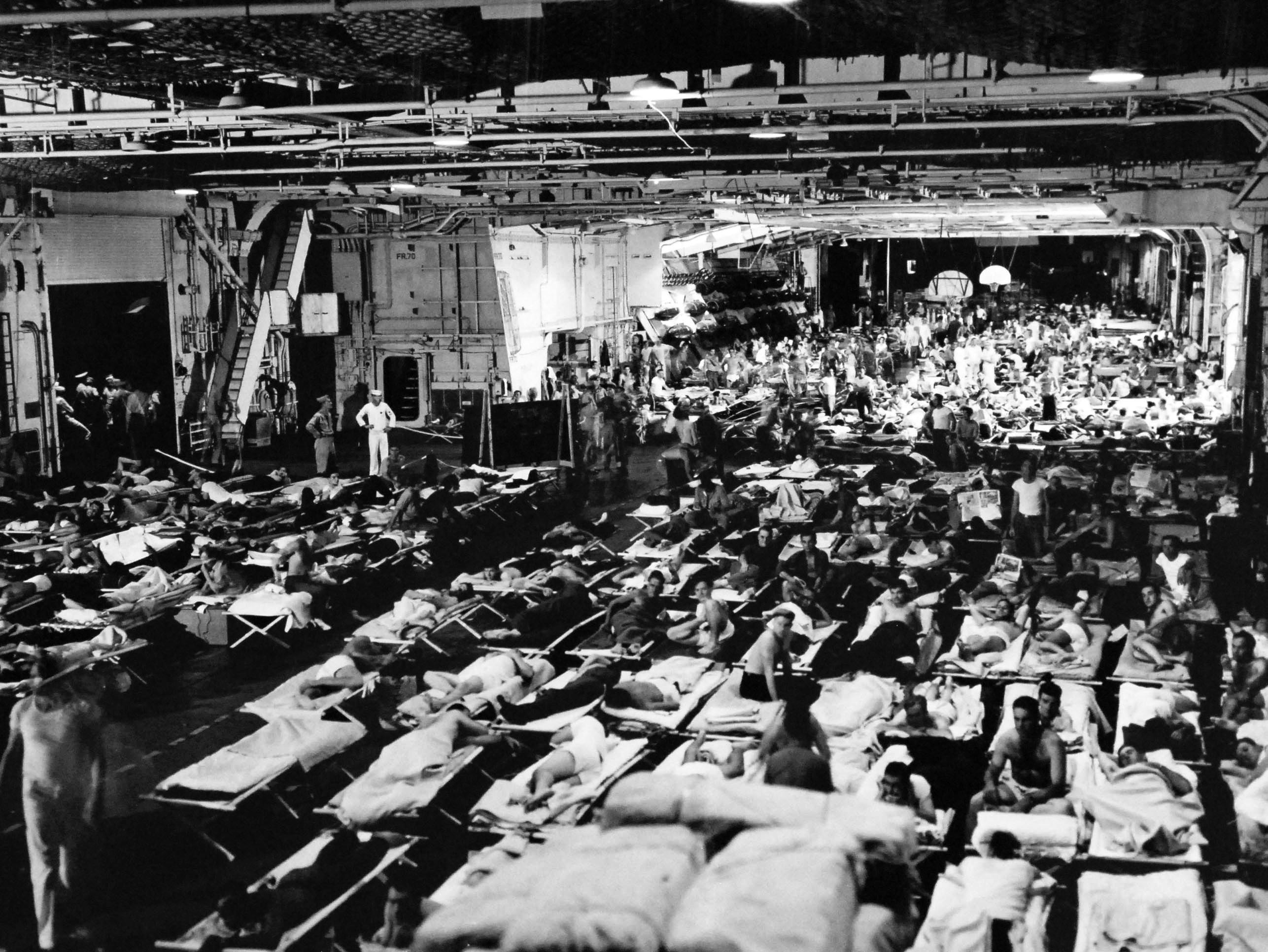
GIs in the hangar bay of Enterprise in 1945

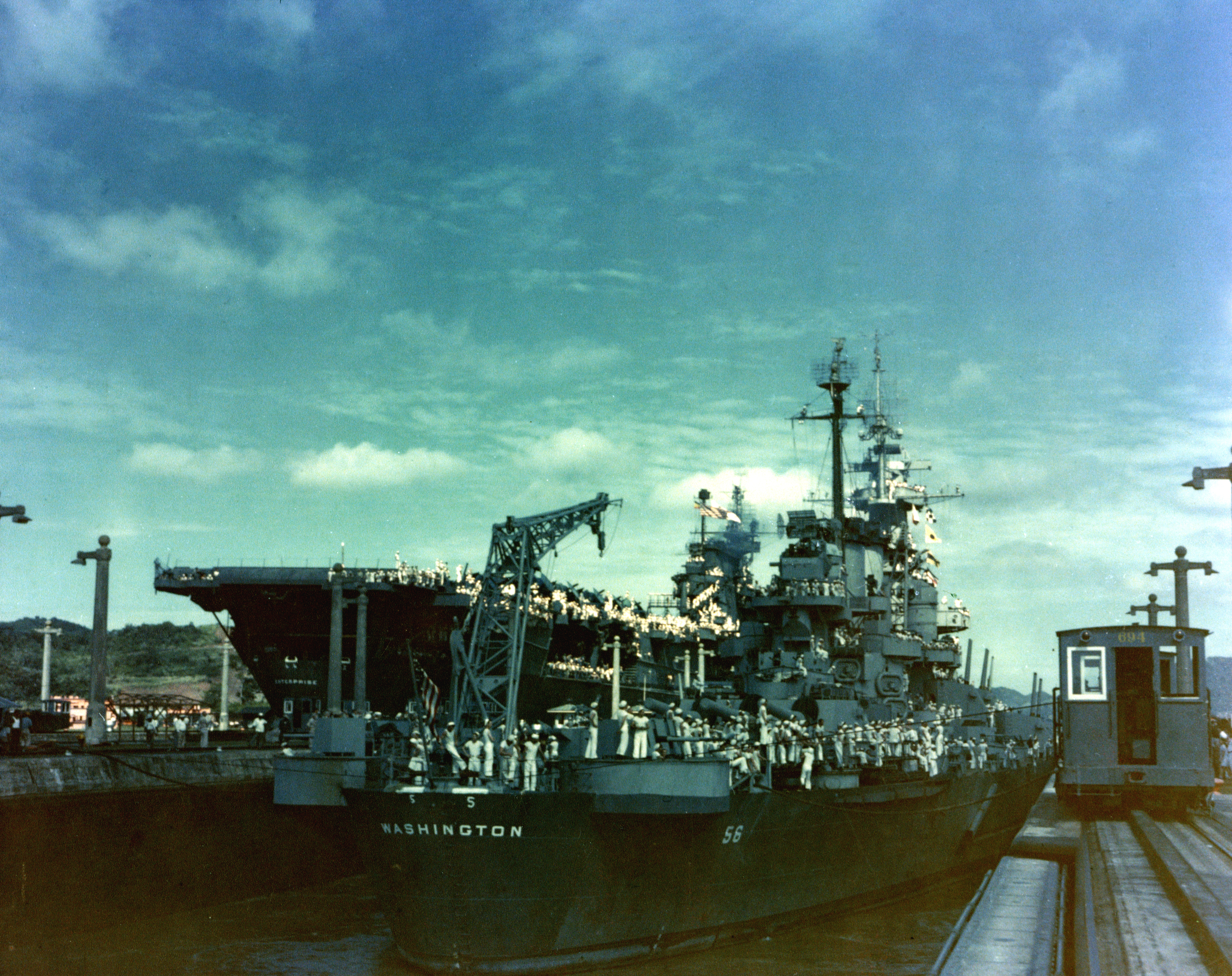
Enterprise and Washington pass through the Panama Canal en route to New York in October 1945

Restored to peak condition, Enterprise voyaged to Pearl Harbor, returning to the States with some 1,141 servicemen due for discharge, including hospital patients and former POWs, then sailed on to New York on 25 September 1945 via the Panama Canal arriving on 17 October 1945. Two weeks later, she proceeded to Boston for installation of additional berthing facilities, then began a series of three Operation Magic Carpet voyages to Europe, bringing home more than 10,000 veterans in her final service to her country.

The first European voyage returned 4,668 servicemen from Southampton, England, in November 1945. On the second trip to Europe, she was boarded by the British First Lord of the Admiralty, Sir Albert Alexander in Southampton, who presented Enterprise with a British Admiralty pennant that was hoisted when a majority of the Admiralty Board members were present. The pennant was given to Enterprise as a token of respect from several high-ranking officers of an ally. She returned to New York on 25 December 1945 with 4,413 servicemen. On this nine-day trip, she encountered four storms, some with winds of 80 miles per hour (130 km/h) that caused 75-foot (23 m) waves that swamped the forecastle deck in water up to 10 feet (3 m) deep. According to damage control officer John U. Monro, the storms smashed sections of walkways and railings, and swept loose objects overboard. Her last voyage was to the Azores, and returned 3,557 personnel, including 212 WACs to New York on 17 January 1946.

=== The end for Enterprise ===
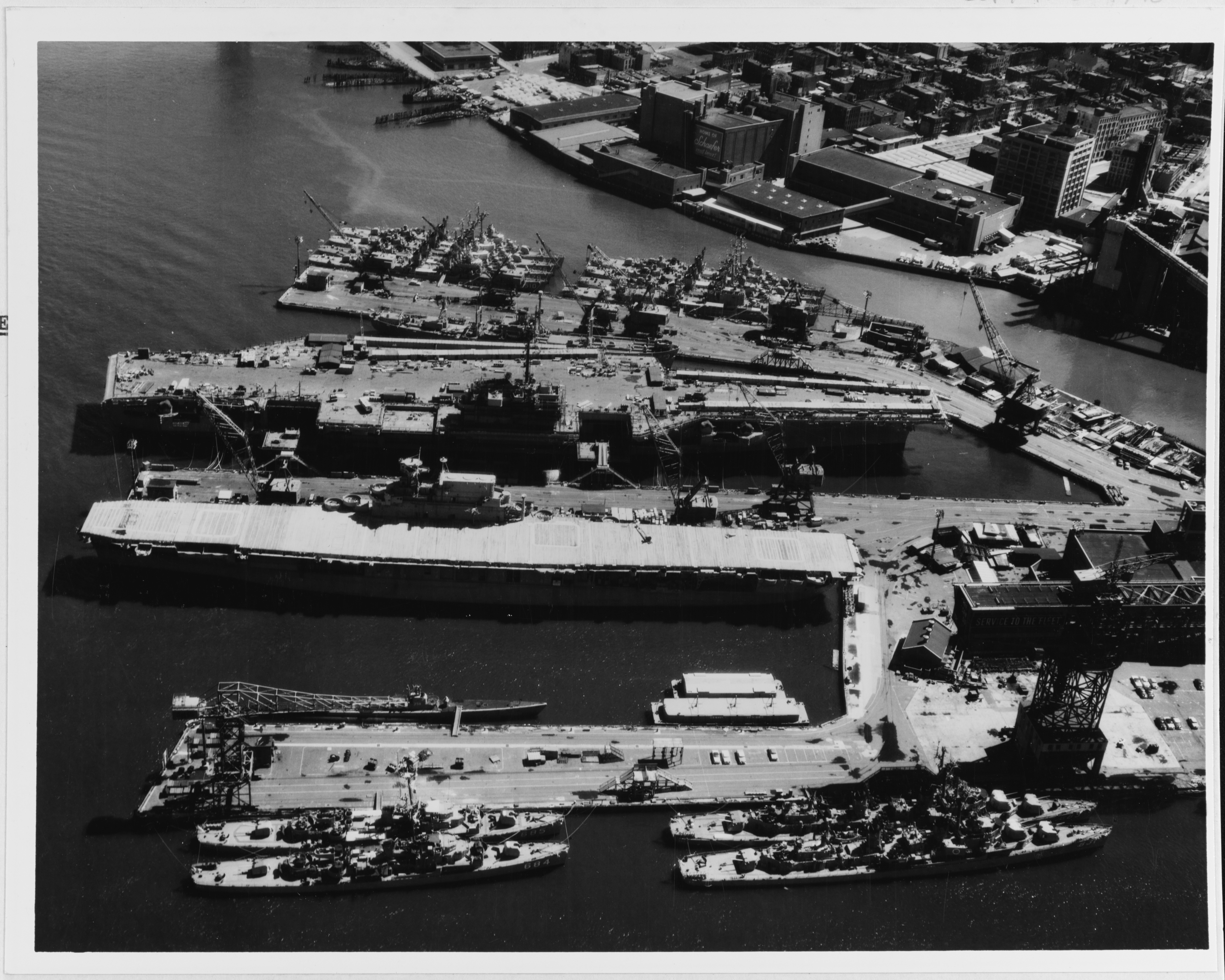
Enterprise awaiting disposal at the New York Naval Shipyard on 22 June 1958. The recently launched Independence is fitting-out on the opposite pier face.

With the commissioning of over two dozen larger and more advanced aircraft carriers by end of 1945, Enterprise was deemed surplus for the post-war needs of America's navy. She entered the New York Naval Shipyard on 18 January 1946 for deactivation and was decommissioned on 17 February 1947. In 1946, she had been scheduled to be handed over to the state of New York as a permanent memorial, but this plan was suspended in 1949. Subsequent attempts were made at preserving the ship as a museum or memorial, but fund-raising efforts failed to raise enough money to buy the vessel from the Navy, and Enterprise was sold on 1 July 1958 to the Lipsett Corporation of New York City for scrapping at Kearny, New Jersey.

A promise was made to save the distinctive tripod mast for inclusion in the Naval Academy's new football stadium, but was never fulfilled; instead, a memorial plaque was installed at the base of what is still called "Enterprise Tower". Scrapping was complete as of May 1960. In 1984, a permanent "Enterprise Exhibit" was dedicated at the Naval Aviation Museum, Naval Air Station Pensacola, Florida, to house artifacts, photos, and other items of historical interest.

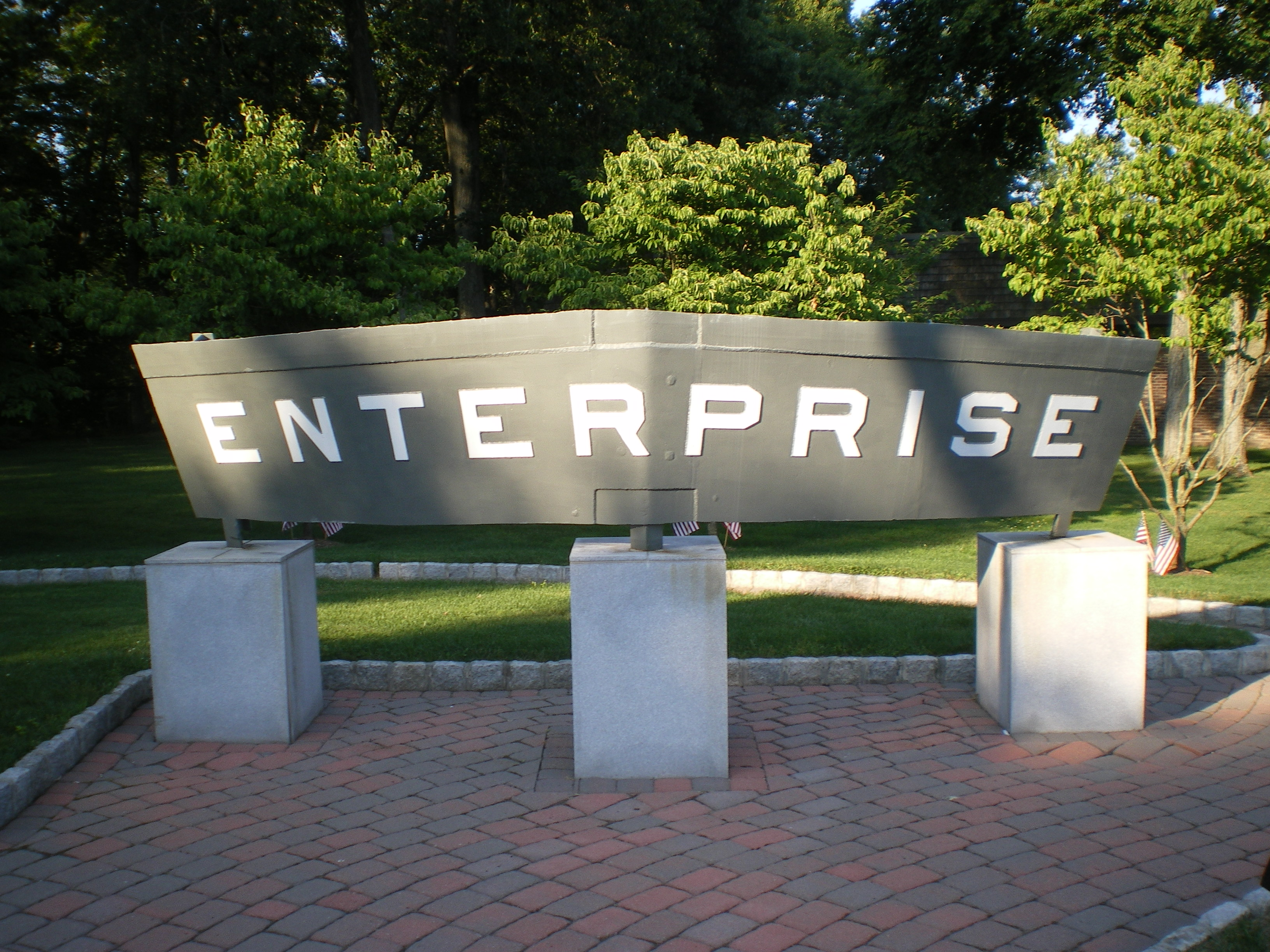
The stern plate of USS Enterprise located in River Vale, New Jersey

Surviving Enterprise artifacts include the ship's bell, which resides at the U.S. Naval Academy, where it is traditionally rung only after Midshipmen victories over West Point. Her commissioning plaque and one of her anchors are on display at the Washington Navy Yard in Washington, D.C.. The salvaged sixteen-foot (4.9 m), one-ton nameplate from the ship's stern, was displayed near a Little League park in River Vale, New Jersey. In 2025, through a cooperative effort by the US Navy, the River Vale community trust and the USS New Jersey Battleship trust, the stern nameplate was refurbished to reflect the camouflage/color scheme of the ship just before decommissioning and mounted on a new mobile platform for display at the USS New Jersey (BB-62) museum dock. The artifact will be on display at the dock until such time as the National Museum of the US Navy is completed, and the stern plate of CV6 can be moved there for display. Unveiled 7 October 2025 in conjunction with the (USN) NAVY 250 celebrations, this final "meeting" reflects on the WW2 service of CV6 and BB62 in the same Pacific fleet.

=== Successors to Enterprise ===
The name was revived in February 1958 when the world's first nuclear-powered aircraft carrier was laid down as the eighth Enterprise; this ship was commissioned in November 1961. Also nicknamed the "Big E", various artifacts and mementos were kept aboard from her predecessor. The port holes in the captain's in-port cabin and conference room are only one example. She was inactivated and removed from service on 1 December 2012 after being in the fleet for 51 years. Due to considerations arising from reactor removal, she cannot be turned into a memorial. At her inactivation, it was announced that the ninth ship to bear the name Enterprise would be the planned Gerald R. Ford-class aircraft carrier, CVN-80. Four portholes taken from CV-6 will be removed from CVN-65 and incorporated into CVN-80.

== Awards and commendations ==
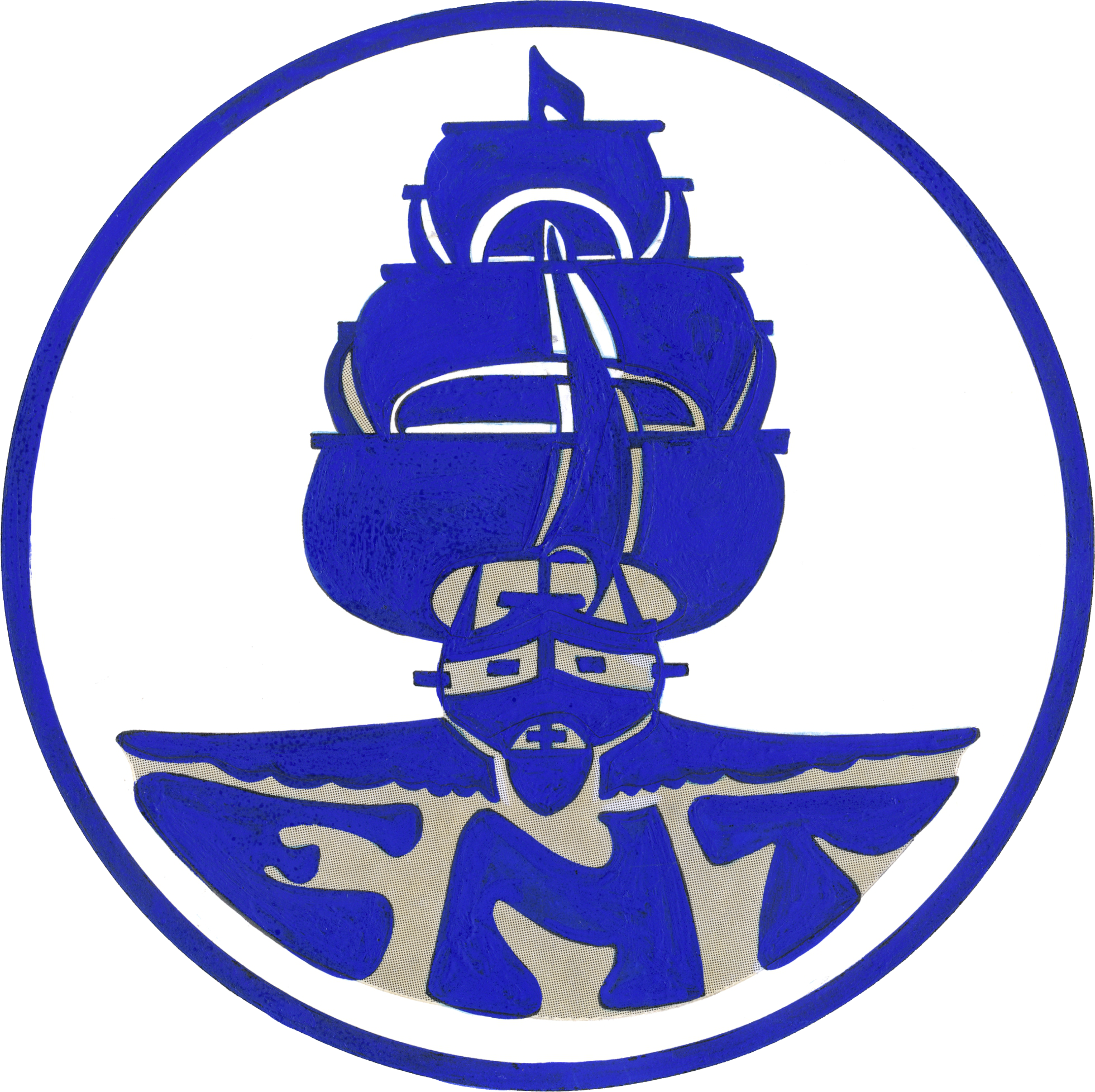
The ship's insignia of Enterprise

Presidential Unit Citation		Navy Unit Commendation
American Defense Service Medal with "Fleet" clasp	American Campaign Medal	Asiatic-Pacific Campaign Medal with twenty stars
World War II Victory Medal	Philippine Presidential Unit Citation	Philippine Liberation Medal

British Admiralty Pennant

Enterprise was awarded a Presidential Unit Citation for her service during World War II. The citation states:

For consistently outstanding performance and distinguished achievement during repeated action against enemy Japanese forces in the Pacific war area, 7 December 1941, to 15 November 1942. Participating in nearly every major carrier engagement in the first year of the war, the Enterprise and her air group, exclusive of far-flung destruction of hostile shore installations throughout the battle area, did sink or damage on her own a total of 35 Japanese vessels and shot down a total of 185 Japanese aircraft. Her aggressive spirit and superb combat efficiency are fitting tribute to the officers and men who so gallantly established her as an ahead bulwark in the defense of the American nation.

In addition to her Presidential Unit Citation, Enterprise received the Navy Unit Commendation and 20 battle stars for World War II service, making her the highest decorated U.S. ship of the war.

Finally, she was presented with a British Admiralty pennant that was hoisted when a majority of the Admiralty Board members were present. The pennant was given to Enterprise as an unofficial token of respect from an ally.

== Legacy ==
- Gene Roddenberry, creator of the television show, Star Trek, named his fictional starship in honor of CV-6 early on in the development of the show, because he was "particularly fascinated" by her war record, and had "always considered it a heroic ship". In doing so, he replaced the name S.S. Yorktown (named after Enterprise's sister ship) he had originally envisioned for his fictional starship, when he conceived the show in early 1964. The name Enterprise has been given to multiple starships throughout the Star Trek franchise over the years in both television and motion picture stories. The CV-6 is acknowledged during a discussion of past vessels named Enterprise in Star Trek: The Motion Picture.
- Jack C. Taylor, founder of Enterprise Rent-A-Car, had served on Enterprise as a fighter pilot during the war, and (re-)named his company in 1969 after the ship.
- Bob Ramsey, who served on the Enterprise during the war as an Aviation Machinist's Mate, invented a bass drum pedal while aboard the Enterprise. Its action was inspired by the landing gear of the fighter planes he serviced, and its footboard design was suggestive of the carrier's runway. He named it "The Ghost" pedal in tribute to the Enterprise, after its nickname "The Gallopin' Ghost". He and his wife manufactured it in their garage in Eugene, Oregon before being bought out by Ludwig Drums. Owner William F. Ludwig, Jr. called it "one of the world's most uniquely engineered" and "most sought after pedals". The Ghost pedal was used by prominent jazz drummers including Shelley Manne, Cozy Cole, Louis Bellson, Lionel Hampton, and Gene Krupa. It was also popularized by rock drummers Carmine Appice and Alex Van Halen.
- The Azur Lane character Enterprise is based on this ship.

== Bibliography ==
- Coté, Larry; Wright, Christopher C. (December 2020). "Question 14/57: Concerning Reduction in Armament in Enterprise (CV-6) Following the End of World War II". Warship International. LVII (4): 274–280. ISSN 0043-0374.
- Evans, Mark L. (26 April 2017). "Enterprise VII (CV-6)". Dictionary of American Naval Fighting Ships. Navy Department, Naval History and Heritage Command. Archived from the original on 7 November 2020.
- Lundstrom, John B. (1994). The First Team and the Guadalcanal Campaign: Naval Fighter Combat from August to November 1942 (2005 ed.). Annapolis, Maryland: Naval Institute Press. ISBN 978-1-59114-472-4.
- Rohwer, J. (2005). Chronology of the War at Sea 1939–1945. Naval Institute Press. ISBN 978-1-59114-119-8.
- Shepherd, Joel (2003). "USS Enterprise CV-6: The Most Decorated Ship of the Second World War". CV6.org. Archived from the original on 25 January 2021.
- Stafford, Edward P. (2002) [First published 1962]. The Big E: The Story of the USS Enterprise. Annapolis, Maryland: Naval Institute Press. ISBN 9781557509987. OCLC 48493709.
- Tillman, Barrett (2012). Enterprise: America's Fightingest Ship and the Men Who Helped Win World War II. New York: Simon & Schuster. ISBN 978-1-4391-9087-6.

Preceded by SP-790	USS Enterprise; 1938–1947	Succeeded by CVN-65
