= Jennifer Boykin =

American engineer

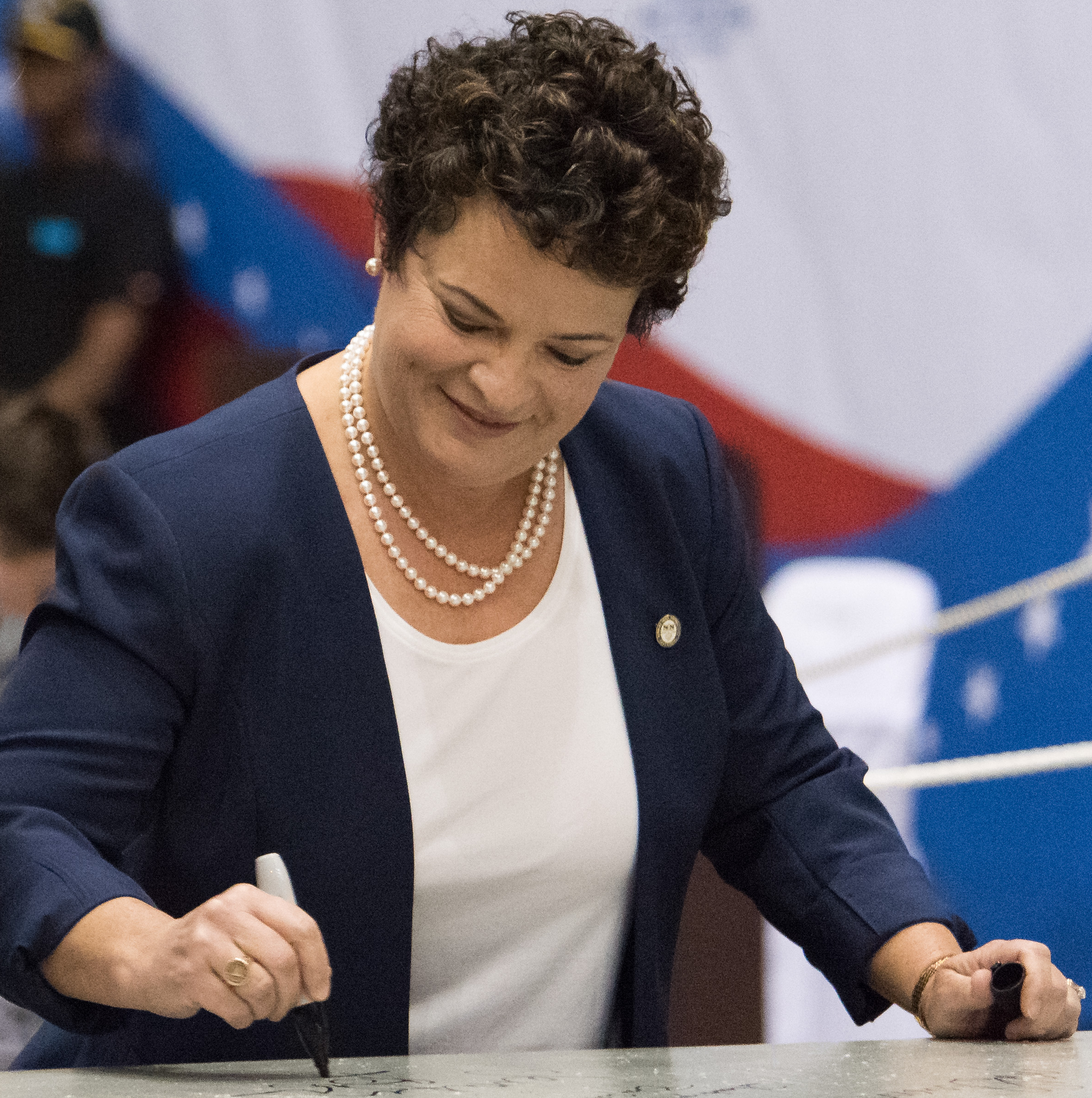
- Boykin in 2017, signing a steel plate used to begin the construction of USS Enterprise (CVN-80)
- Education: United States Merchant Marine Academy; George Washington University
- Occupations: Engineer; Former President of Newport News Shipbuilding

Jennifer Boykin is an engineer, the first woman president of Newport News Shipbuilding, and was the vice president of Huntington Ingalls Industries, which is located in Newport News, Virginia. In 2024, Boykin retired.

== Biography ==
=== Early life ===
Boykin's father's parents are both from Puerto Rico. She was born in California and grew up in St. Louis, Missouri. Jennifer was a tomboy and was the first girl to play baseball with the boys in her division.

=== Education ===
She received her Bachelor of Science degree in Marine Engineering from the United States Merchant Marine Academy in Kings Point, New York.

She earned her Master of Science degree in Engineering Management from George Washington University in Washington, D.C.

=== Career ===
Boykin first worked as an engineer in the nuclear engineering division at Newport News Shipbuilding, before moving through the ranks, and eventually becoming president of the company. She was the first woman president of Newport News Shipbuilding, the first in over 133 years of operation. She ran the largest shipbuilding operations in the United States, including the only one that builds nuclear-powered aircraft carriers and one of two that makes nuclear-powered submarines. In 2021, the shipyard was working on Gerald R. Ford-class aircraft carriers and employed over 22,000 personnel. Boykin retired at the end of 2024 after 37 years with the shipbuilder.

=== Family life ===
She has been married to Blake Boykin for more than 30 years, and has one daughter that also works at Newport News Shipbuilding.
