= HMS Enterprise =

Fifteen ships of the Royal Navy have been named HMS Enterprise (or HMS Enterprize) while another was planned:

- HMS Enterprise (1705) was a 24-gun sixth rate, previously the French frigate L'Entreprise, captured in May 1705. She was wrecked in October 1707.
- HMS Enterprise (1709) was a 44-gun fifth rate launched in 1709. She underwent a great repair in 1718–19, was hulked in 1740 and fitted as a hospital ship in 1745 before being sold in 1749.
- HMS Liverpool (1741), a 44-gun frigate, was to have been named Enterprise, but was renamed five months before her launch in 1741.
- HMS Enterprize (1743) was an 8-gun sloop captured from the Spanish in 1743. She was employed solely in the Mediterranean as a dispatch vessel and tender, and was sold in 1748 at Minorca.
- HMS Enterprise was a 48-gun fifth rate launched in 1693 as HMS Norwich (1693). She was renamed Enterprise in 1744 as a 44-gun fifth rate and was broken up in 1771.
- HMS Enterprise (1774) was a 28-gun Enterprise-class sixth-rate frigate launched in August 1774, on harbour service from 1790 and broken up in 1807.
- HMS George (1775) was a 10-gun tender captured by the Americans in 1775, see USS Enterprise (1775).
- HMS Enterprise was a ship used for harbour service, launched in 1778 as HMS Resource. Resource was rebuilt as a 22-gun floating battery in 1804, renamed Enterprise in 1806 and sold in 1816.
- HMS Enterprise (1824) was a wooden paddle gunvessel purchased in 1824 and in service until 1830.
- HMS Enterprise (1848) was a survey sloop launched in 1848, used as an Arctic discovery ship in the search for Franklin's lost expedition, then used as a coal hulk from 1860 and sold in 1903.
- HMS Enterprise was to have been a wooden screw sloop. She was laid down in 1861, renamed HMS Circassian in 1862 but cancelled in 1863.
- HMS Enterprise (1864) was an ironclad sloop ordered as HMS Circassian, but renamed in 1862. She was launched in 1864 and sold in 1884.
- HMS Enterprise (D52) was an Emerald-class light cruiser launched in 1919 and sold in 1946.
- HMS Enterprise (A71) was an Echo-class inshore survey ship launched in 1958 and sold in 1985.
- HMS Enterprise (H88) was an Echo-class multi-role survey vessel (hydrographic/oceanographic) of the Royal Navy launched in 2002 and decommissioned in 2023. She was sold to Bangladesh Navy and is scheduled to be delivered to Bangladesh in 2027.

Four other ships which served with the Royal Navy were also named Enterprise, but were not commissioned warships and so did not have the "HMS" prefix.

- Enterprise LP was a British East India Company armed paddle steamer that served alongside the Fleet in the First China War from 1839 to 1840 and the Second Burmese War in 1852.
- Enterprise was an uncommissioned tugboat that was in service at Portsmouth Dockyard from 1899 to 1919, when she was renamed Emprise. She continued to serve until 1947.
- Enterprise was an uncommissioned auxiliary patrol anti-submarine net drifter with Harwich local forces from 1914 to 1918.
- Enterprise II was an uncommissioned drifter, originally based at Larne but transferred to Italian waters in November 1915. In March 1916 she struck a naval mine off Brindisi and sank with eight casualties.

== Battle honours ==
Ships named Enterprise have earned the following battle honours: (Note: In the Royal Navy, and other Commonwealth navies that follow the traditions of the RN, battle honours awarded to a ship are inherited by subsequent ships to bear the same name, and are displayed on the ship's honours board.)

- Atlantic, 1939−40
- Norway, 1940
- Biscay, 1943
- Normandy, 1944

== See also ==
- HMS Entreprenante (HMS Enterprizing)
- USS Enterprise (disambiguation)
