= Enterprise (SP-790) =

Patrol vessel of the United States Navy

History

United States
- Name: Enterprise
- Owner: Elsie C. Stewart; United States Navy
- Builder: F.S. Nock, East Greenwich, Rhode Island
- Completed: 1917

General characteristics
- Tonnage: 16 GRT
- Length: 66 ft (20.1 m) LOA
- Beam: 12 ft (3.7 m)
- Draft: 3 ft 7 in (1.1 m)
- Propulsion: 2 x 4 cyl. Sterling engines
- Speed: 22 kn (25 mph; 41 km/h)
- Range: 171 nmi (197 mi; 317 km)
- Complement: 8
- Armament: 1 × 1-pounder gun, 1 x machine gun

Enterprise was a private wooden motorboat owned by Elsie C. Stewart (Note: "Ships' Data U.S. Naval Vessels has "E. C. Steward" but lacking first name. Preference given to reference with full name.) purchased by the United States Navy for $24,101 for non-commissioned service as a Section Patrol craft with the assigned number 790 in the 2nd Naval District during the period of United States participation in World War I. (Note: Only commissioned vessels are given the United States Ship (USS) prefix, thus "USS Enterprise" for this motorboat is incorrect.)

== See also ==
- List of ships of the United States Navy named Enterprise

Preceded by 1874	USS Enterprise; 1917-1919	Succeeded by CV-6
