= USS Enterprise (CVN-80) =

Future Gerald R. Ford-class aircraft carrier

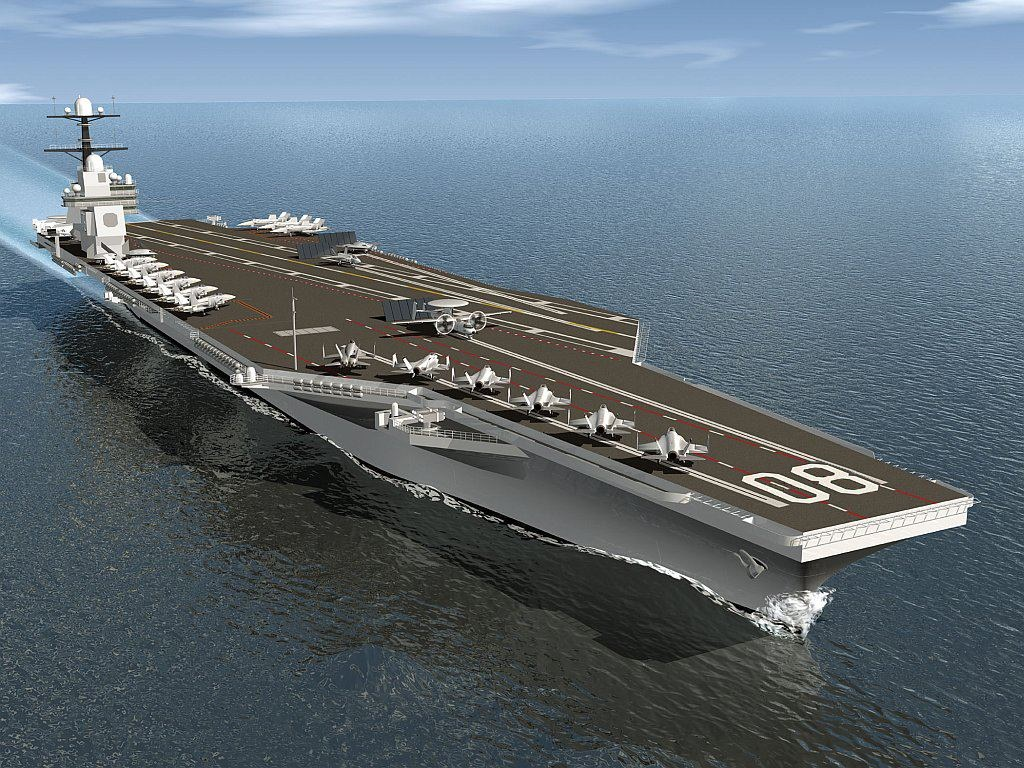
- Artist's impression of the future CVN-80

History

United States
- Name: Enterprise
- Namesake: USS Enterprise (CVN-65)
- Awarded: May 23, 2016 (advance planning); January 31, 2019 (construction)
- Builder: Huntington Ingalls Industries
- Laid down: April 5, 2022; August 27, 2022 (official)
- Sponsored by: Katie Ledecky and Simone Biles
- Commissioned: March 2031 (planned)
- Identification: CVN-80
- Status: Under construction

General characteristics
- Class & type: Gerald R. Ford-class aircraft carrier
- Displacement: About 100,000 long tons (100,000 tonnes) (full load)
- Length: 1,106 ft (337 m)
- Beam: 134 ft (41 m)
- Draft: 39 ft (12 m)
- Installed power: Two A1B nuclear reactors
- Propulsion: Four shafts
- Speed: In excess of 30 knots (56 km/h; 35 mph)
- Range: Unlimited distance; 20–25 years
- Complement: 4,660
- Armament: Surface-to-air missiles; Close-in weapons systems
- Aircraft carried: More than 80, approx. up to 90 combat aircraft
- Aviation facilities: 1,092 ft × 256 ft (333 m × 78 m) flight deck

USS Enterprise (CVN-80) is planned to be the third Gerald R. Ford-class aircraft carrier to be built for the United States Navy. She will be the ninth United States naval vessel and third aircraft carrier to bear the name, and is scheduled to be in operation by 2031. Her construction began in August 2017 with a steel-cutting ceremony.

== Naming ==
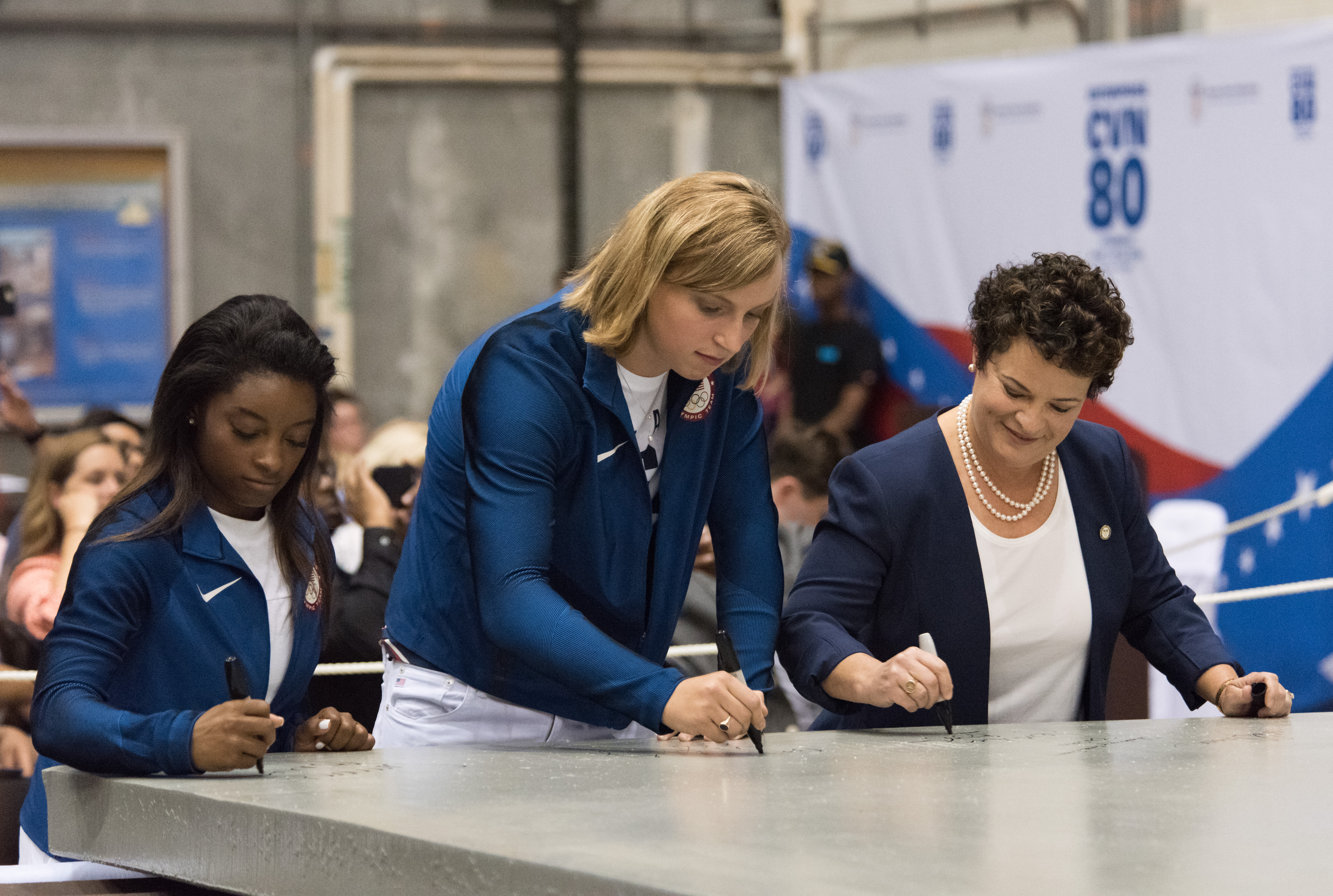
The ship's sponsors Simone Biles and Katie Ledecky, joined by Newport News Shipbuilding president Jennifer Boykin, sign a 35-ton steel plate used to begin the construction of Enterprise

On December 1, 2012, during the presentation of a pre-recorded speech at the inactivation ceremony for USS Enterprise (CVN-65), then-secretary of the Navy Ray Mabus announced that CVN-80 would be named Enterprise. She will be the ninth ship and the third aircraft carrier in the history of the United States Navy to bear the name. CVN-80 will also be the first American supercarrier not to be named in honor of a person since America was commissioned in 1966. In December 2016, Mabus chose Olympic gold medalists Katie Ledecky and Simone Biles to sponsor the ship.

== Construction ==
CVN-80 is being built by Huntington Ingalls Industries' Newport News Shipbuilding in Newport News, Virginia. CVN-80 is the first aircraft carrier completely designed and built through digital platforms. The first cut of steel ceremony, marking the beginning of fabrication of the ship's components, was held on August 21, 2017, with the ship's sponsors Katie Ledecky and Simone Biles present. Construction began in advance of the purchase contract and construction award, in early 2018.

Steel from CVN-65 will be recycled and used in the construction of CVN-80. As of August 2022, approximately 20,000 pounds (9,100 kg) of steel from CVN-65 has been salvaged and recycled for inclusion into CVN-80, with another 15,000 pounds (6,800 kg) still to be processed, for a total of 35,000 pounds (16,000 kg). Enterprise will also incorporate four portholes taken from CV-6, her World War II predecessor.

Enterprise will replace USS Dwight D. Eisenhower and was scheduled to be launched in November 2025, with a planned delivery date of March 2028. In 2025 the delivery date slipped to July 2030, citing late delivery of sequence critical material, and was again delayed in 2026 to March 2031.

The ship's keel was laid, with no specific ceremony, on April 5, 2022, three weeks ahead of schedule. The shipbuilder held an official keel-laying ceremony on August 27 of the same year.

== See also ==
- List of aircraft carriers of the United States Navy
- List of ships of the United States Navy named Enterprise

Preceded by CVN-65	USS Enterprise; 2025-	Succeeded by (Current)
