= USS Enterprise (1775) =

Sloop of the Continental Navy

History

United States
- Name: Enterprise
- Operator: Continental Army
- Acquired: Captured 18 May 1775 (as George)
- Fate: Burned to prevent capture, 7 July 1777

General characteristics
- Type: Sloop
- Tonnage: 70
- Propulsion: Sail
- Sail plan: Sloop
- Complement: 50 officers and enlisted
- Armament: 12 × 4-pounder guns; 10 × swivel guns

Service record
- Commanders: Benedict Arnold
- Operations: Battle of Quebec (1775); Battle of Valcour Island (1776); Siege of Fort Ticonderoga (1777)

USS Enterprise was a 12-gun sloop of the Continental Army that served in Lake Champlain during the American Revolutionary War. She was the first of a long line of ships of the United States to bear the name Enterprise.

== Service history ==
=== Built in St. Johns, Quebec ===
Enterprise was originally a British supply sloop named George, built at St. Johns (now Saint-Jean-sur-Richelieu) in Quebec, Canada.

=== Raid on St. Johns ===
In May 1775, a small American force under Colonel Benedict Arnold sailed up the Richelieu River on the recently captured Liberty. At 07:00 on 18 May, Arnold and 35 raiders captured the fort and shipyards at St. Johns, along with the newly launched George, with no loss of life. The unlaunched schooner Royal Savage was also at the shipyard, and would be captured by the Americans later that year. Two hours later Arnold's raiders left with the newly captured sloop, which was later armed with 12 guns and renamed Enterprise.

=== Siege of St. Johns ===
Enterprise was, at first, the most significant warship in the Lake Champlain squadron – which was charged with maintaining American control of the lake early in the war – and at times she acted as flagship for Colonel Arnold. Control of Lake Champlain and the adjoining Hudson River would have enabled the British to cut off vital supply routes between New England and the other colonies, and it would have allowed British troops to cross and attack Albany.

On 28 August 1775, Enterprise and other vessels embarked with more than 1,000 troops as part of an expedition against St. Johns, Montreal, and Quebec. Though St. Johns and Montreal were captured, and Quebec was besieged, the arrival of strong British reinforcements forced the Americans to withdraw from Canada in the spring of 1776. Enterprise and the other craft sailed to Île aux Noix in the Richelieu River, where they waited while Arnold directed the building of a fleet at Fort Ticonderoga and Skenesboro (now Whitehall).

=== Battle of Valcour Island ===
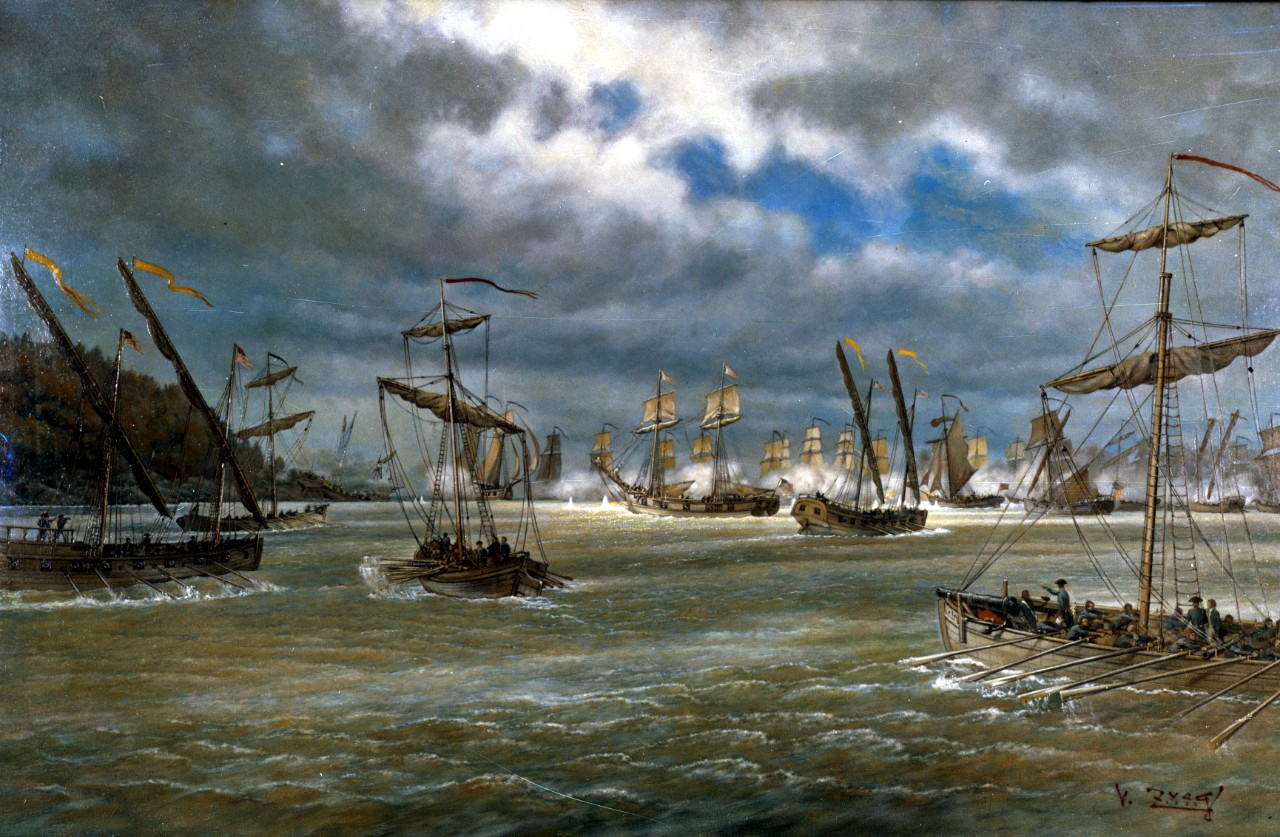
Painting of the Battle of Valcour Island

The battle was finally joined in the Battle of Valcour Island on 11 October 1776 at Valcour Island, near Plattsburgh, New York, a site of Arnold's choosing. Markedly inferior in firepower, much of Arnold's fleet was sunk or damaged by nightfall. However, he managed to slip the remaining ships, including Enterprise, past the British fleet that night towards Fort Crown Point. A running battle took place over the next two days, and resulted in the loss of all but five of the American ships. Enterprise and four others escaped to Crown Point, then sailed on to Ticonderoga.

==== Aftermath of the Battle of Valcour Island ====
Although a tactical defeat, the battle was a strategic victory for the Americans. Arnold and his little fleet had disrupted the British invasion into New York such that it could not be mounted before the onset of winter. It was nearly a year before the advance could be renewed. In that interval American troops were recruited and trained, and on 17 October 1777, under General Horatio Gates, defeated the British decisively at Saratoga, New York. This victory was a primary factor in bringing about the alliance with France, and bringing the powerful French navy to the aid of the Colonies.

=== Siege of Fort Ticonderoga ===
During the British advance prior to the Battle of Saratoga, Enterprise was one of five vessels assigned to duty convoying bateaux in the evacuation of Ticonderoga. The small American force was no match for the British fleet on Lake Champlain, and after two ships had been captured, Enterprise and the other two were run aground on 7 July 1777, and burned to prevent their capture.

== See also ==
- List of ships of the United States Navy named Enterprise

== Notes ==
Citations

== Bibliography ==
Online resources

- DANFS (7 July 2015). "Enterprise I (Sloop)". Dictionary of American Naval Fighting Ships. Naval History and Heritage Command. This article incorporates text from this source, which is in the public domain.

Further reading

- Nelson, James L (2006). Benedict Arnold's Navy. New York: McGraw Hill. ISBN 978-0-07-146806-0. OCLC 255396879.

Preceded by (First)	USS Enterprise; 1775-1777	Succeeded by 1799
