= Enterprise (1776) =

Schooner of the Continental Navy

History

United States
- Name: Enterprise
- Operator: Continental Navy
- Commissioned: June 1776; Province of Maryland
- In service: 20 December 1776
- Out of service: February 1777
- Fate: Returned to the; Maryland Council of Safety

General characteristics
- Tons burthen: 25
- Sail plan: Schooner
- Complement: 60
- Armament: 8 guns

Enterprise was an 8-gun schooner of the Continental Navy. She was the second American ship to bear the name. She was a successful privateer before she was purchased by the Continental Navy in 1776. Commanded by Captain James Campbell, Enterprise operated principally in Chesapeake Bay. She convoyed transports, carried out reconnaissance, and guarded the shores against foraging raids by the British. Only meager records of her service have been found; they indicate that she was apparently returned to the Maryland Council of Safety in 1777.

== See also ==
- List of ships of the United States Navy named Enterprise

== Sources ==
- Enterprise (II) at DANFS
- "An Enterprise for the Continental Navy". Voyages of the Enterprise. SandcastleVI.com.
