= Bukit Shahbandar Forest Recreation Park =

Public park in Brunei

- Taman Rekreasi Hutan Bukit Shahbandar
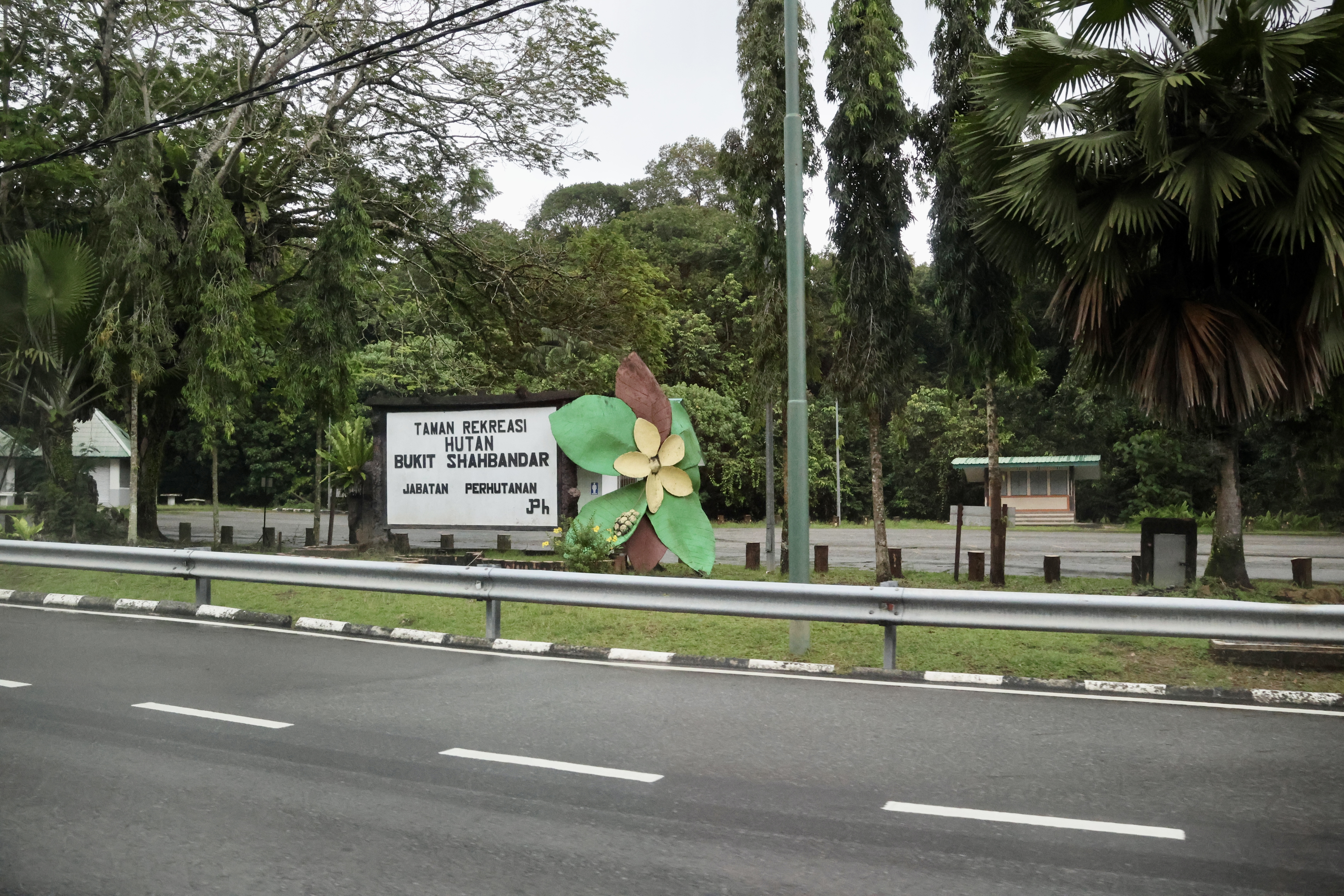
- Monument at the park's entrance
- Interactive map of Bukit Shahbandar Forest Recreation Park
- Type: Nature park
- Location: Kampong Jerudong 'B', Brunei–Muara, Brunei
- Coordinates: 4°57′09″N 114°51′18″E
- Area: 234 ha (580 acres)
- Established: 1998; 28 years ago
- Managed by: Forestry Department
- Visitors: 35,475 (1996)
- Parking: On site (no charge)

Bukit Shahbandar Forest Recreation Park (Malay: Taman Rekreasi Hutan Bukit Shahbandar) is a protected recreational forest in Kampong Jerudong 'B', Brunei–Muara District, Brunei. It is characterised primarily by coniferous plantations. Unlike other conservation forests, which focus on preserving biodiversity and primary forest ecosystems, Bukit Shahbandar serves a recreational and educational purpose, though its natural vegetation has been altered.

== Features ==
The area was initially a cattle farm. After jogging and hiking trails were established in 1980, the site has undergone consistent development and upkeep. In line with the 6th National Development Plan, the Forestry Department completed the full development of Bukit Shahbandar Forest Recreation Park in 1998, transforming it into one of the designated forest recreation areas to meet the increasing demand for outdoor leisure activities. Spanning 234 hectares (580 acres), the park is situated approximately 15 kilometres (9.3 mi) from Bandar Seri Begawan, about a 15 to 20-minute drive from the capital along the Muara–Tutong Highway. It is also located near the Empire Brunei, on the coast road between Kampong Jerudong and Tungku Beach.

The park is characterised by a prominent grassy ridge with multiple high peaks ranging from 391–470 feet (119–143 m) in elevation, extending southward as a defining topographical feature. To the east of this ridge lies a coastal range of densely forested hills, rising to heights between 200 and 358 feet, sloping east-northeasterly. The park's extensive trail network caters to hikers of varying skill levels, with nine hills offering distinct pathways and shortcuts, as indicated on the map at the entrance. Numbered according to the hills they traverse, the trails feature steep elevations, rocky terrain, and natural topography, with checkpoints and shelters along the way for rest and appreciation of the natural environment.

The park features native kerangas woodland, complemented by stands of Acacia mangium and Caribbean pine trees. It is home to various wildlife, including long-tailed macaques. Facilities within the park cater to a range of visitors, offering children's play areas, light workout equipment, a sizeable pond, and stalls selling refreshments. Additionally, the park includes a mountain biking trail and observation towers that provide panoramic views of Bandar Seri Begawan and the Jerudong area.

== Events ==
The downhill mountain bike event of the 1999 SEA Games was held at Bukit Shahbandar Forest Recreation Park. Similarly, Tour Brunei 2005, also known as Le Tour de Brunei 2005, utilised the park's trails.

On 17 August 2005, Sultan Hassanal Bolkiah led the Ministry of Defence's Shahbandar Run at the park. The event was attended by commander of the Royal Brunei Armed Forces Halbi Mohammad Yusof, Deputy Minister of Defence Yasmin Umar, and other senior representatives from the ministry and the armed forces.

On 19 February 2006, Sultan Hassanal Bolkiah and Prince Abdul Malik participated in a walking event at Bukit Shahbandar alongside around 1,000 government officials. Organised by the Prime Minister's Office, the Ministry of Health, and the Ministry of Industry and Primary Resources, the event featured a well-marked path ending at the ninth hill, with safety measures including paramedics and representatives from the armed forces and forestry department stationed along the route.

The Bukit Shahbandar Challenge 2006, held on 10 September as part of World Forestry Day celebrations, attracted over 445 competitors across six categories. Despite the emergence of newer hiking destinations, Bukit Shahbandar remains a well-known location for its challenging trails and distinctive natural environment. The park continues to be a regular choice for departmental and ministry events, including brisk walks and other group activities.

== See also ==
- List of parks in Brunei Darussalam
- Protected areas of Brunei
