= Protected areas of Brunei =

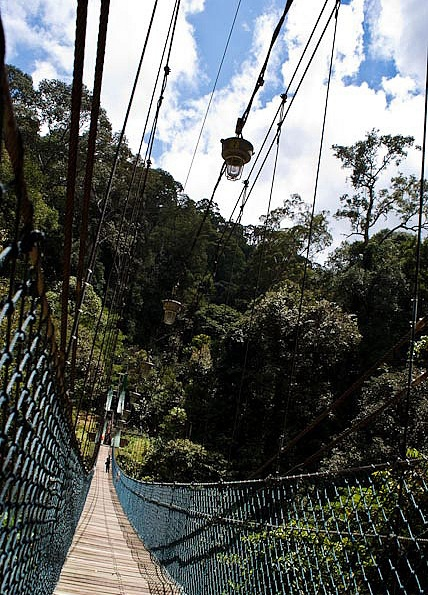
A suspension footbridge in Ulu Temburong National Park in the isolated Temburong District of eastern Brunei

Protected areas of Brunei are established by the Government of Brunei, in accordance with national development objectives and global biogeoecological strategies in which forests play an important role. The country's marine protected areas remained at 0.2% in 2022. As of 2011, nearly half of Brunei Darussalam is still primary forest, however this coverage is dwindling and only 17% of the country is officially protected.

== Background ==
Brunei's ecosystem is home to a diverse range of flora and fauna, including tropical evergreen rainforests and coral reefs. The country is home to roughly 15,000 species of vascular plants and 2,000 types of trees due to its diversified ecosystem. This diverse plant life supports a vibrant ecosystem that is home to a wide range of animal species. Land development, pollution, encroachment, climate change, and invasive alien species are all threatening Brunei's biodiversity. Because of the high speed of land development for infrastructure projects and agricultural expansion, huge amounts of natural habitat have been cleared, resulting in habitat fragmentation and loss. Because many species rely on specific environments for life, the loss of ecosystems upsets the delicate balance of biodiversity.

== Policies ==
=== Acts ===
The Protected Areas and Protected Places Act specifies the procedures that must be taken to protect any protected area or protected place. No one may enter the premises of protected areas or places unless they have a permit issued by an authorised authority. The Act also includes defensive measures that may endanger the life of anyone entering or attempting to enter a protected area or protected location.

The 2004 Protected Places Order established the declaration of protected location. It declares that the location listed in the first column of the Schedule, as more specifically detailed in the plan specified in the second column and deposited in the office of the Surveyor-General, is a protected place for the purposes of the act. The Schedule identifies protected locations, plan numbers, and the authority in charge.

=== Heart of Borneo ===
The government proposes expanding Brunei's protected areas as part of the HoB Initiative, including expanding the 'Bukit Teraja' protection area. Currently, the country has three protected areas: Temburong, the Ingai-Bedawan reserves, and the Labi area (Teraja-Mendaram). The proposed Bukit Teraja Protected Area extension is a relatively small piece of land of 2,500 hectares (6,200 acres), but it would be of great value due to its high biodiversity, potential for eco-tourism, and connectivity with the Mendaram conservation area.

The proposed Teraja Conservation Forest would also connect the existing Bukit Teraja Protection Forest to the Ulu Mendaram Conservation Forest, one of Borneo's last remaining intact peat-swamp forests, creating one large unified virgin rainforest, the connectivity of which is critical for plants and animals living there.

=== Enrichment planting ===
Enrichment planting on understocked regions and holes produced after forestry operations is a significant component of Brunei Selection Felling System (BSFS). Seedlings of premium native species appropriate to the present forest conditions, such as Dryobalanops beccarii, Dryobalanops lanceolata, Shorea macrophylla, and Shorea parvifolia, are planted to increase the forest's total timber output. This ensures the long-term viability of timber production. During the 7th National Development Plan (NDP 7), the enrichment planting initiative was launched. The activity took place in two deforested areas: Labi Hills Forest Reserve in Belait District and Ladan Hills Forest Reserve in Tutong District. As of 2016, the Forestry Department had enriched over 14,000 hectares.

== List of protected areas ==
Name	Type	Area (ha)
Ulu Temburong National Park	Natural park	48,859
Tasek Merimbun Heritage Park	Natural park	7,800
Bukit Teraja Protection Forest	Protected forest	6,825
Bukit Batu Patam	Protected forest	921
Bukit Ulu Tutong	Protected forest	251
Benutan Catchment	Protected forest	2,932
Bukit Bedawan	Protected forest	7,633
Anduki Forest Reserve	Conservation forest	917
Andulau Forest Reserve	Conservation forest	746
Badas Forest Reserve	Conservation forest	76
Belait Peat Swamp Forest Forest Resource Reserve	Conservation forest	1,492
Berakas Forest Resource Reserve	Conservation forest	149
Bukit Biang	Conservation forest	2,730
Bukit Sawat	Conservation forest	486
Keluyoh Forest Resource Reserve	Conservation forest	77
Sungai Ingei Conservation Forest	Conservation forest	18,491
Ulu Badas Forest Resource Reserve	Conservation forest	443
Ulu Mendaram Conservation Forest	Conservation forest	6,170
Sungai Liang Forest Recreational Park	Recreational forest	66
Berakas Forest Reserve Recreational Park	Recreational forest	199
Luagan Lalak Forest Recreation Park	Recreational forest	275
Peradayan Forest Reserve	Recreational forest	997
Bukit Subok Forest Recreational Park	Recreational forest	15
Bukit Shahbandar Forest Recreation Park	Recreational forest	234
Pulau Selirong Forest Recreation Park	Recreational forest	2,566
Sungai Lumut Arboretum (Forest Recreational Park)	Recreational forest	200
Bukit Saeh Recreational Park	Recreational forest	-

== Notable protected areas ==
=== Ulu Temburong National Park ===
Brunei's first national park, founded in 1991, protects over 50,000 hectares of primary rainforest, considered to be among the best-preserved on Borneo. Only 100 hectares of the 50,000 hectares are accessible to visitors. The national park is actually part of a larger protected area known as the Batu Apoi Forest Reserve, which encompasses up to 40% of the District of Temburong. Ulu Temburong National Park has no road access and can only be reached by boat.

The logging complex located in the national park, Ulu-Ulu National Park Resort, is being renovated to become a luxury resort managed by a major international hotel operator. The execution would improve the park's image and appeal as one of the most important tourist sites in Brunei. It can also only be accessed by boarding a Temuai (longboat) from Batang Duri Jetty.

=== Andulau Forest Reserve ===
The Andulau Forest Reserve is located southeast of Kampong Keluyoh and Sungai Liang of Belait District. It stands at an elevation of 82 metres (269 ft). The forest reserve used a sort of selection system from the late 1940s until the implementation of the Malayan Uniform System (MUS) in 1958. However, there are no records that properly describe its real application. It can only be assumed that a girth limit was imposed on the commercial species gathered. The MUS was initially used in Compartment 5 of the Andulau Forest Reserve in 1958, after it had been logged in 1955–1957.

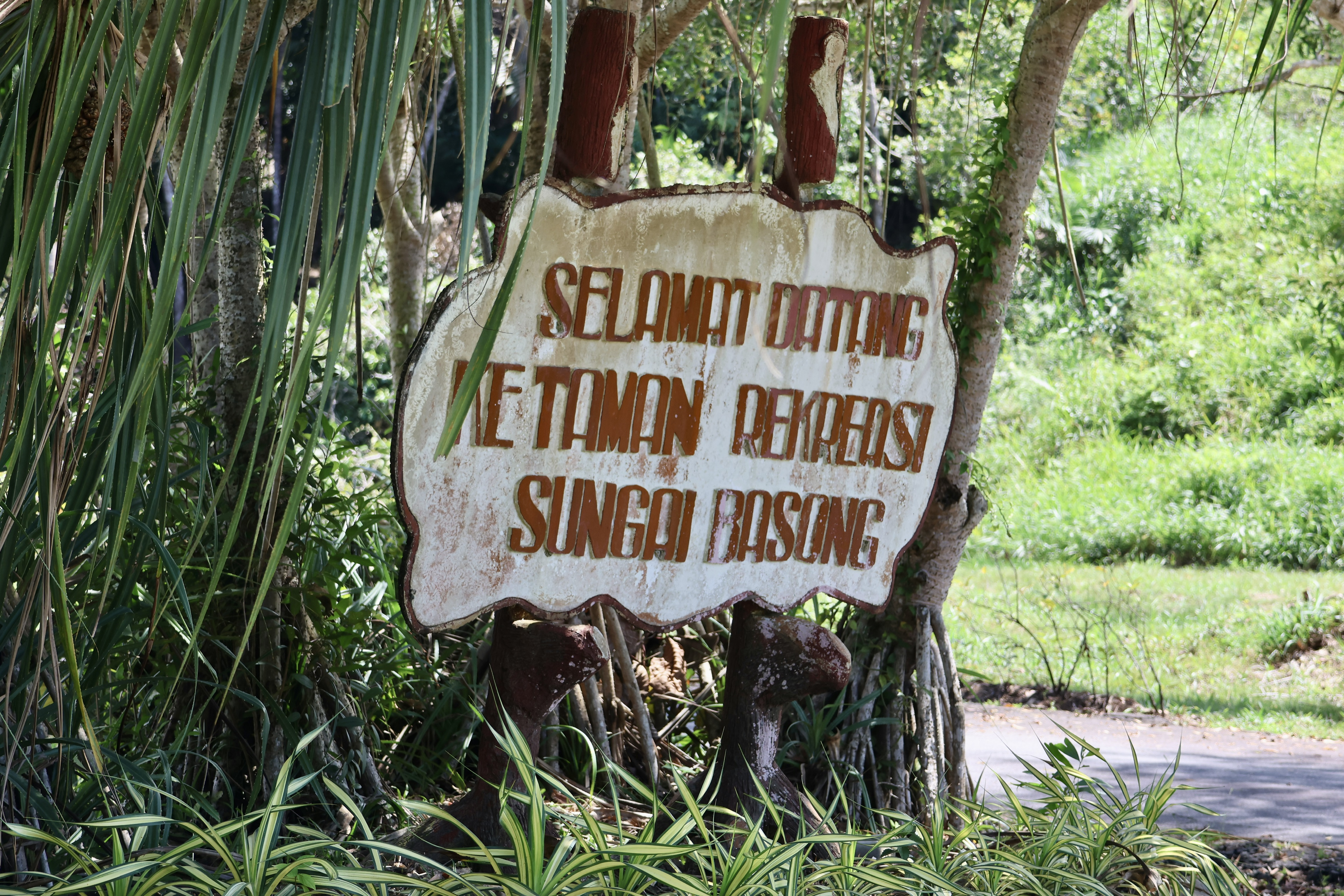
Sungai Basong Recreational Park

=== Sungai Basong Recreational Park ===
Sungai Basong Recreational Park, located near the Muara–Tutong Highway and about 5 minutes from Tutong Town Centre, is a tourist destination in the district for photographers and joggers. The park includes a Rumah Budaya (Cultural Village) that highlights the district's five ethnic groups. The park was opened in 1989 and has undergone numerous improvements since then. The park is also a good place for camping and other outdoor activities. The park features two lakes and is surrounded by lush vegetation and wildlife. Since 2001, the park has featured five ethnic houses that showcase the traditional homes of the Dusun, Tutong, Iban, Kedayan, and Chinese people.

=== Benutan Reservoir ===
The Benutan Dam, sometimes known as the Binutan Dam, is an embankment dam on the Benutan River in Tutong District. The dam was built in 1988 with the primary goal of enhancing water supplies to Brunei's capital, Bandar Seri Begawan. It normally has a reservoir volume of 45,000,000 cubic metres (1.6×10^{9} cu ft). Following the impoundment of its reservoir in 1989, the Benutan Reservoir began to fill and was totally full by 1991. Since February 1990, monthly physicochemical and biological data have revealed that this is a stratified, dystrophic black-water lake with low levels of inorganic nutrients, high organic loads, and high productivity.

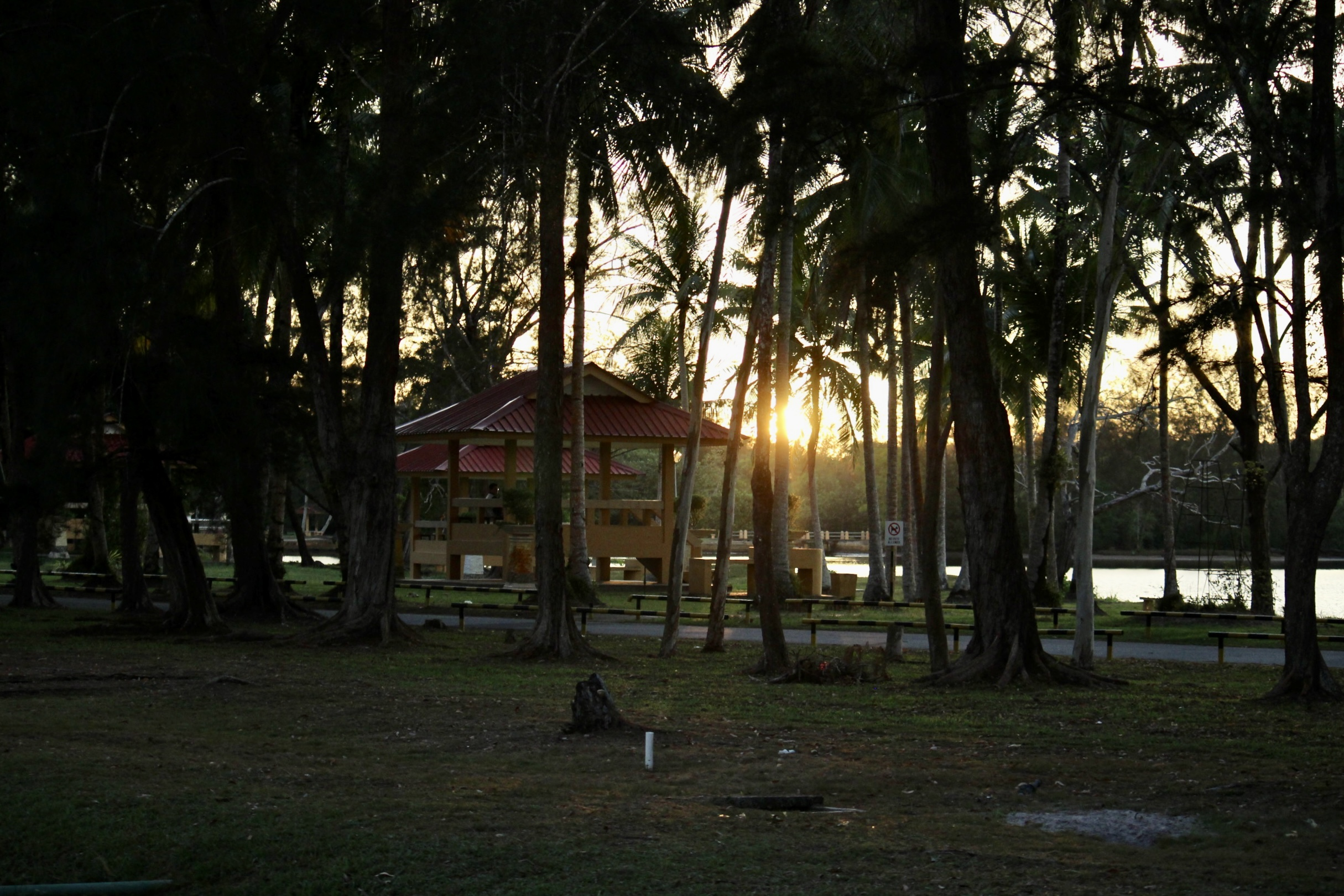
Anduki Recreational Park

=== Anduki Recreational Park ===
The Shelterwood Compartment System, is a silvicultural system used to be applied on the kapurpaya (Dryobalanops rappa) forests in Anduki Forest Reserve from the 1930s to late 1950s. The Anduki Recreational Park, first opened in 1992 to commemorate Sultan Haji Hassanal Bolkiah's silver jubilee, is an ideal refuge for both locals and tourists. The park, which overlooks a lake, provides a setting for gatherings or radio-controlled boat racing. It is a 63 hectare recreation park situated in the outskirts of Seria town and borders the Anduki Airfield.

=== Berakas Recreation Park ===
This park is mostly made up of Kerangas Forest, which has survived multiple wildfires, resulting in a variety of rare tree species such as the Ru Runang (Casuarina), Sindok-sindok (Endospermum), and Selunsor (Tristania). There are also Acacia mangium, araucaria hunsteinii, and Kapur bukit (Dryobalanops) present. The park is located near the sea and is 18 kilometres (11 mi) from the capital and contains a forest reserve, including the park, of around 348 hectares.

=== Bukit Shahbandar Forest Recreation Park ===
It is 234 hectares in size and is located 15 kilometres from Bandar Seri Begawan. Plantings of Caribbean pine and Acacia mangium trees complement the natural Kerangas Forest. Aside from the standard amenities, this park has fish ponds and a multi-purpose outdoor arena, remote control vehicle racing, and other recreational activities. The observation tower at the top of the hill is a feature of the park, from which one can have a panoramic view of the South China Sea and coastline to the north, Bandar Seri Begawan and suburbs to the southwest, the Istana Nurul Izzah and Jerudong Park to the west, and vast tracts of green land.

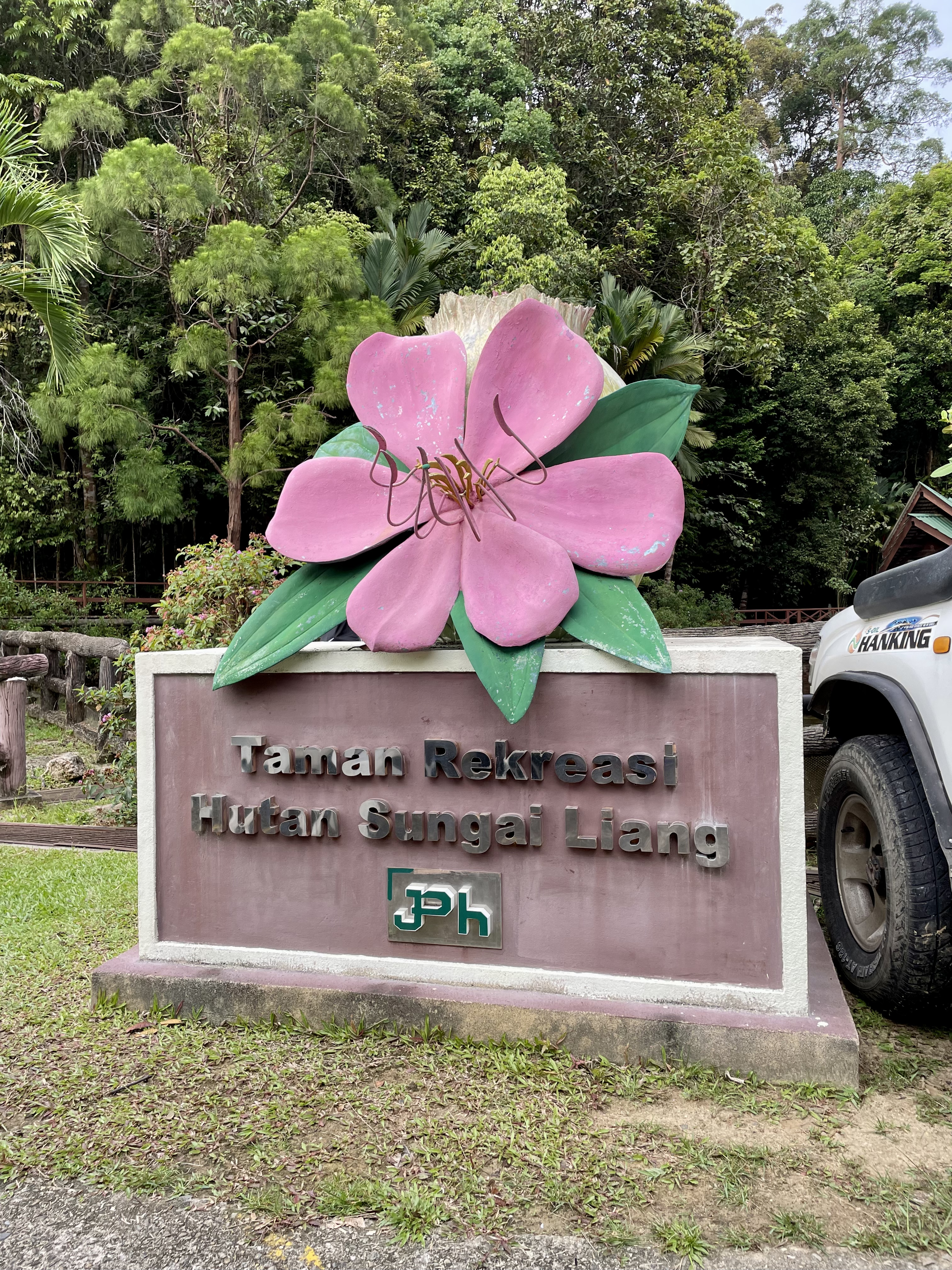
Sungai Liang Recreation Park

=== Sungai Liang Recreation Park ===
The park is about 14 hectares in size and is mostly made up of lowland forest. It is roughly 70 kilometers from Bandar Seri Begawan. It is also close to the Brunei Forestry Centre. The recreational park offers tourist amenities such as picnic areas, jogging, hiking, and pathways that lead to various locations within the park. The park is frequently used for teaching and research by the Forestry Department and other educational institutions throughout Brunei. This park also has a mini-lake, a floating hut, shelter huts, and open areas for outdoor recreational activities. It has been in operation since March 1989.
