= List of parks in Brunei Darussalam =

Parks of Brunei
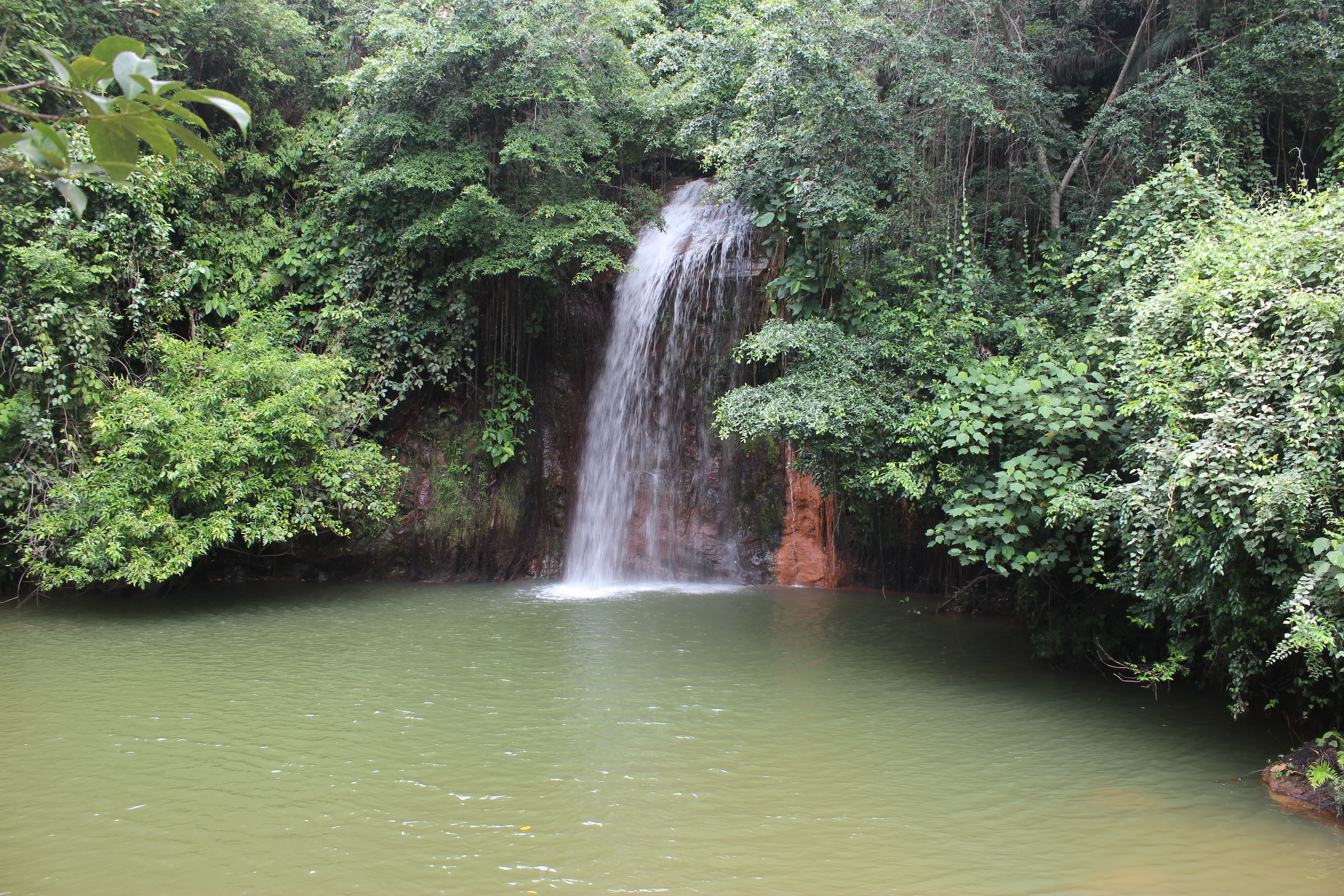
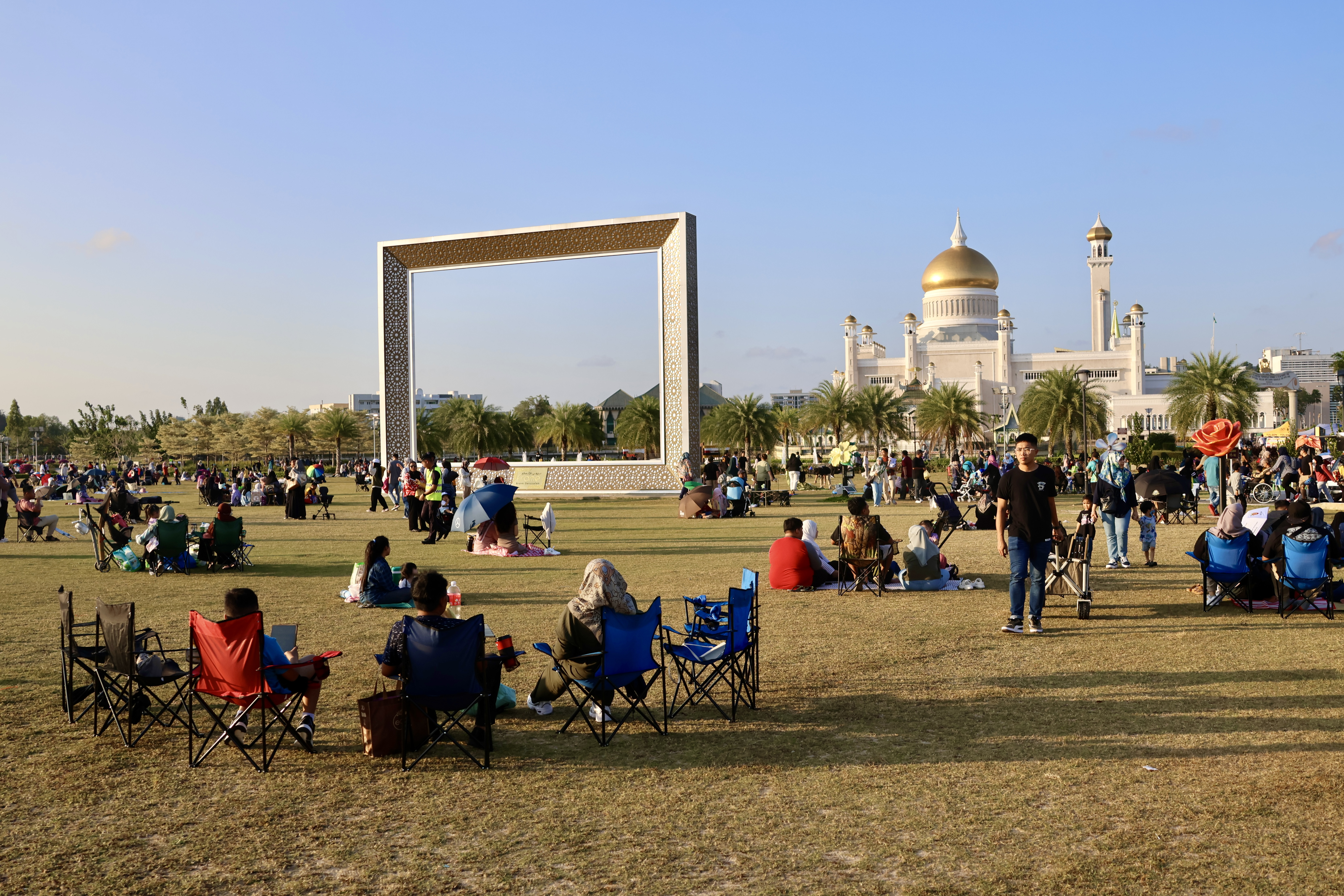
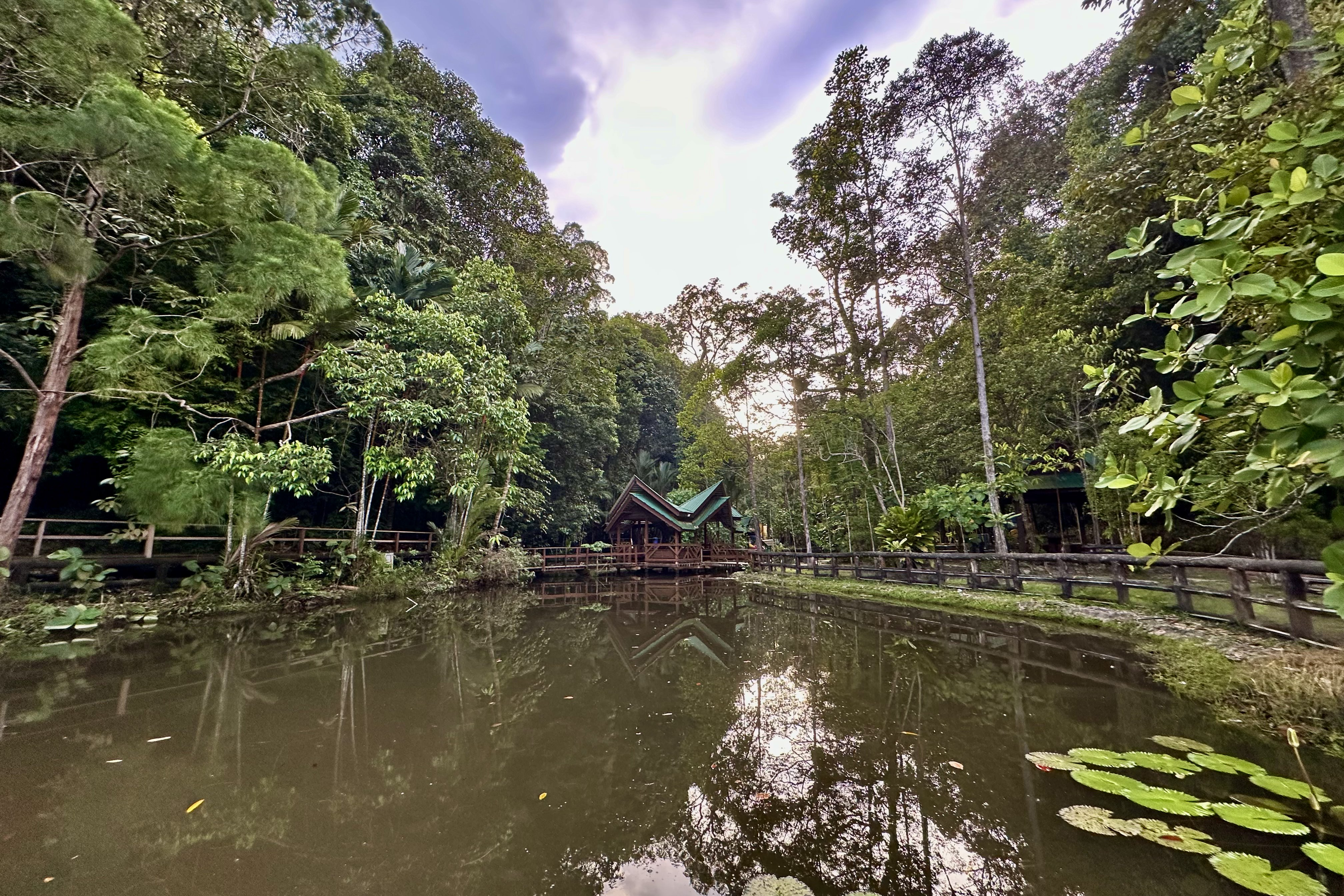
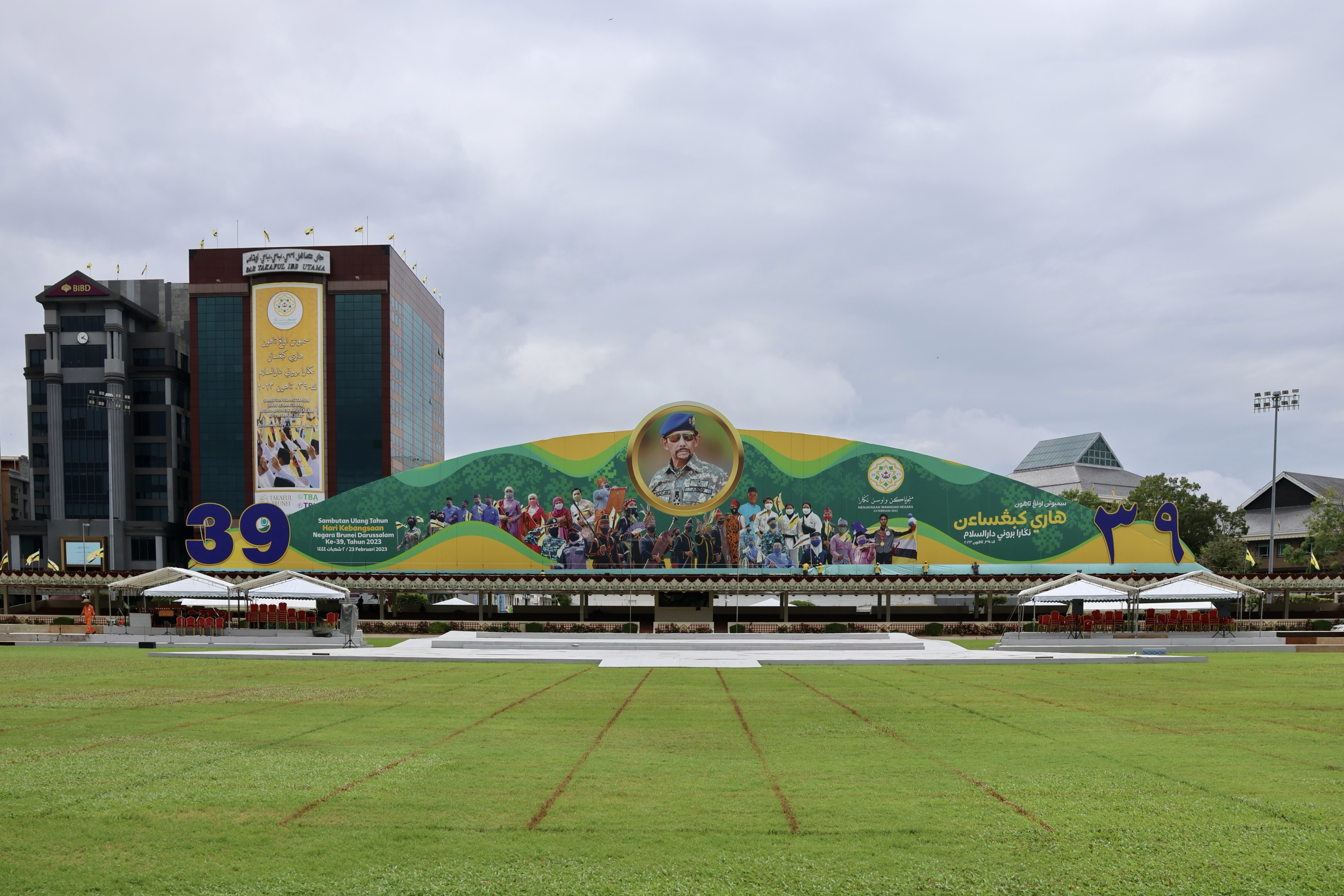
- From top left to right: Tasek Lama Recreational Park, Taman Mahkota Jubli Emas, Sungai Liang Forest Recreation Park and Taman Haji Sir Muda Omar 'Ali Saifuddien
- Location: Various locations around Brunei
- Use: Recreational
- Sights: Primary and secondary forests

Brunei is a self-governing nation with several parks. This is a list of parks in Brunei Darussalam that are currently operational and have Wikipedia entries.

== History ==
Numerous locations have been developed and marketed as "eco-tourism" attractions in line with the National Forestry Policy. For example, the Forestry Department launched several environmental initiatives under the 6th National Development Plan (RKN 6), including the creation of national parks, forest recreation zones, and a reafforestation program. By 1998, eleven forest recreation parks (FRPs) had been established, such as Sungai Liang, Luagan Lalak, Bukit Shahbandar, Berakas, Peradayan, Selirong, Bukit Subok, Sungai Basong, Kuala Belalong, Batang Duri, and Ulu Temburong. These parks became increasingly popular, particularly among domestic tourists.

Under RKN 7, additional efforts were introduced to conserve and protect forests for both economic and environmental benefits. The forestry sector contributed B$22.3 million to GDP in 1996 and B$27 million in 2000, accounting for 3.0% of total GDP. Special attention will be given to plantation activities, sustainable timber production, the establishment of national parks and recreational areas, wasteland rehabilitation, and rattan production for the furniture industry, all of which are supported by a B$104 million investment in forestry sector development under the forest conservation policy.

== List ==
| Name | Type | Area (m$^2$) |
|---|---|---|
| Ulu Temburong National Park | Nature | 500,000,000 |
| Tasek Merimbun Heritage Park | Riverine | 78,000,000 |
| Tasek Sarubing Recreational Park | Riverine | |
| Tasek Lama Recreational Park | Riverine | |
| Bukit Shahbandar Forest Recreation Park | Nature | 700,000 |
| Berakas Forest Reserve Recreational Park | Nature | 3,480,000 |
| Tumpuan Telisai Recreational Park | Community | |
| Sungai Liang Forest Recreational Park | Community | 140,000 |
| Luagan Lalak Forest Recreation Park | Nature | 2,700,000 |
| Bukit Patoi Forest Recreational Park | Nature | 10,700,000 |
| Selirong Forest Recreation Park | Offshore islands | 25,660,000 |
