= Luagan Lalak Forest Recreation Park =

Public park in Brunei

- Taman Rekreasi Hutan Luagan Lalak
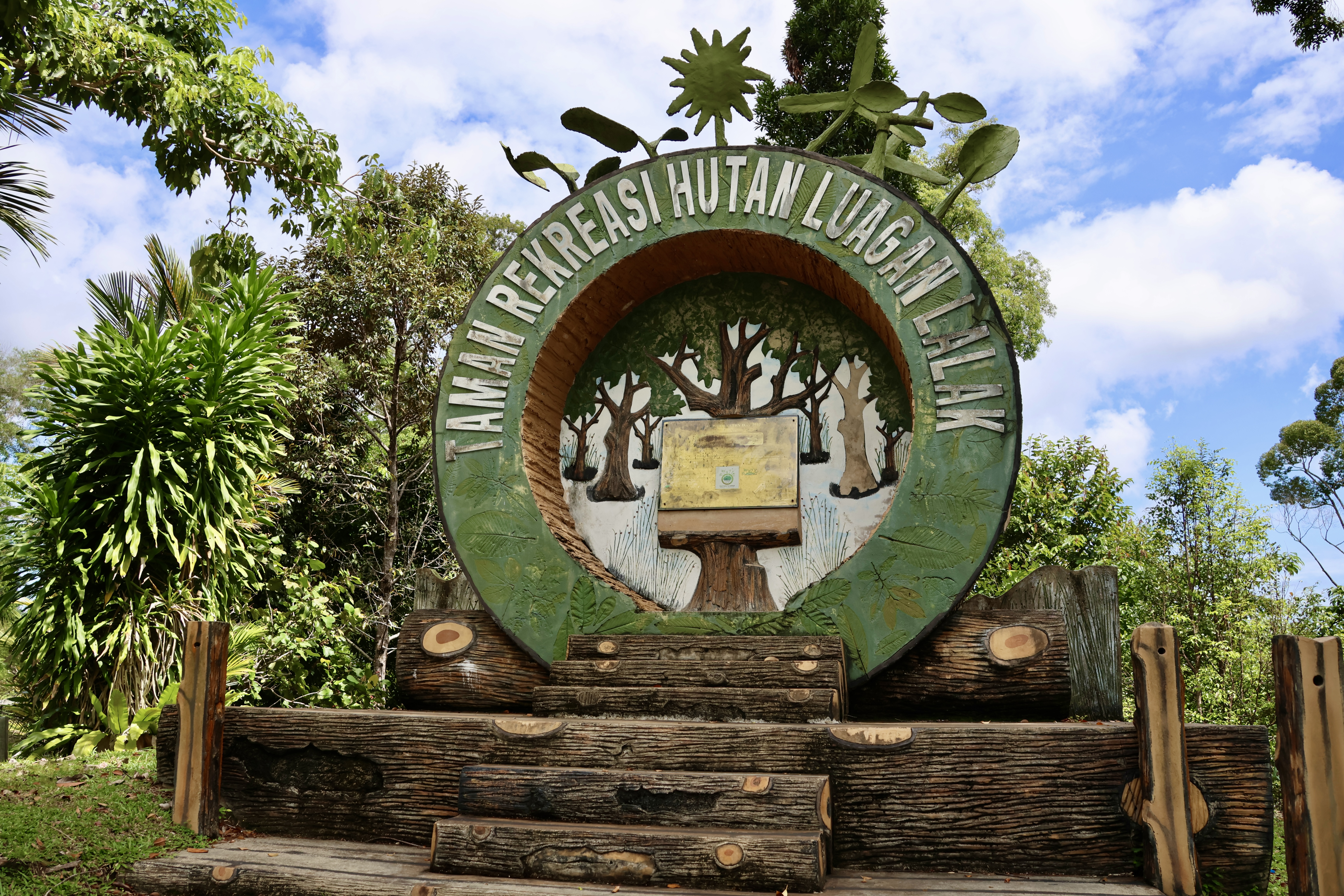
- Monument at the park's entrance
- Interactive map of Luagan Lalak Forest Recreation Park
- Type: Nature park
- Location: Kampong Sungai Petai, Belait, Brunei
- Coordinates: 4.5153136°N 114.4751616°E
- Area: 270 hectares (670 acres)
- Established: 1980; 46 years ago
- Etymology: Channa striata
- Managed by: Forestry Department
- Visitors: 4,164 (1996)
- Parking: On site (no charge)

Luagan Lalak Forest Recreation Park (Note: The park is sometimes known as Luagan Lalak Forest Recreational Park.) (Malay: Taman Rekreasi Hutan Luagan Lalak) is a protected recreational forest in Mukim Labi, Belait District, Brunei. It is a significant wetland conservation area under the jurisdiction of the Forestry Department, valued for its role in biodiversity protection and ecological importance. Unlike many recreational forest parks that include disturbed or plantation forests, Luagan Lalak remains a natural wetland ecosystem, underscoring its significance in conservation efforts.

The park is situated nearly 100 kilometres (62 mi) from Bandar Seri Begawan. Visitors travelling from the capital can reach Kampong Sungai Liang in about an hour via the Telisai–Lumut Highway, where a left-hand exit leads to Jalan Labi. From there, the park is an additional 25 kilometres away. As public transportation does not serve the area, access to the park requires private vehicle transportation.

== Etymology ==
The park's name is derived from the Brunei Malay word luagan, which means a large non-flowing water body, while lalak is believed to be an error in either the spelling or pronunciation of the word dalak (Channa striata), a snakehead fish common in Brunei waters.

== History ==
The park was established in 1980, with additional groundwork carried out in 1993. As part of the 6th National Development Plan, the Forestry Department further developed the park in 1998. Initially, only 10 hectares were open to the public, and the park underwent further renovations before its official reopening by Yahya Bakar, the minister of industry and primary resources at the time, in 2012, to commemorate World Forestry Day. By May 2018, Luagan Lalak had welcomed over 81,000 visitors since its opening in 2001.

== Features ==
Situated within the Labi Hills forest reserve, Luagan Lalak is a 270-hectare (670-acre) (Note: On the other hand, the International Union for Conservation of Nature asserted that the area was 275 hectares.) alluvial freshwater swamp (empran), notable for its dark waters and expansive fields of Lepironia articulata (purun)—grass-like plants with triangular stems and small blossoms. (Note: In the dry months, the water level in this park's alluvial freshwater swamp typically drops significantly, and a field of sedges, mostly Lepironia species, covers the valley. In the nation, or perhaps throughout the entire island of Borneo, this phenomenon is extremely uncommon.) This unique ecosystem supports a diverse array of insects, birds, and small fish. A 200-metre (660 ft) wooden bridge spans the swamp's waters. The park's amenities consisted of three gazebos, walkways, benches, and a barbecue pit. Restroom facilities are located across the road from the forest reserve's entrance.

Numerous elusive terrestrial mammals, such as the Sunda pangolin, maroon leaf monkey, colugo, and Horsfield's tarsier, can be found in Luagan Lalak. Because of the abundance of birds, photographers and birdwatchers come to see both migratory and local species. Among the notable birds are the garnet pitta, argus pheasant, Storm's stork, Bornean bristlehead, rhinoceros hornbill, great slaty woodpecker, crested fireback, red-billed malkoha, common kingfisher, buffy fish owl, yellow-rumped flowerpecker, black-and-yellow, black-and-red, and green broadbill.

== Mythology ==
According to oral tradition, long ago, a large dragon meditated in a deep hole within this area. After a long period, the dragon awoke, swung its tail, and caused the surrounding area to expand. The hole where it had meditated filled with water, transforming into a lake brimming with various plants and large fish. The dragon then journeyed to the sea via a nearby river. Another local tale tells of a fisherman who relied on his trade to survive. Having explored all the fishing spots in the area, he became exhausted and rested under a shady tree, eventually falling asleep. In his dream, he encountered a large dragon, which guided him to a vast, fish-filled lake to the north of the sunrise. Upon waking, the fisherman followed the dragon's instructions, began fishing, and caught so many fish that he lost his way. He became trapped in the lake area and ultimately settled there.

== Gallery ==
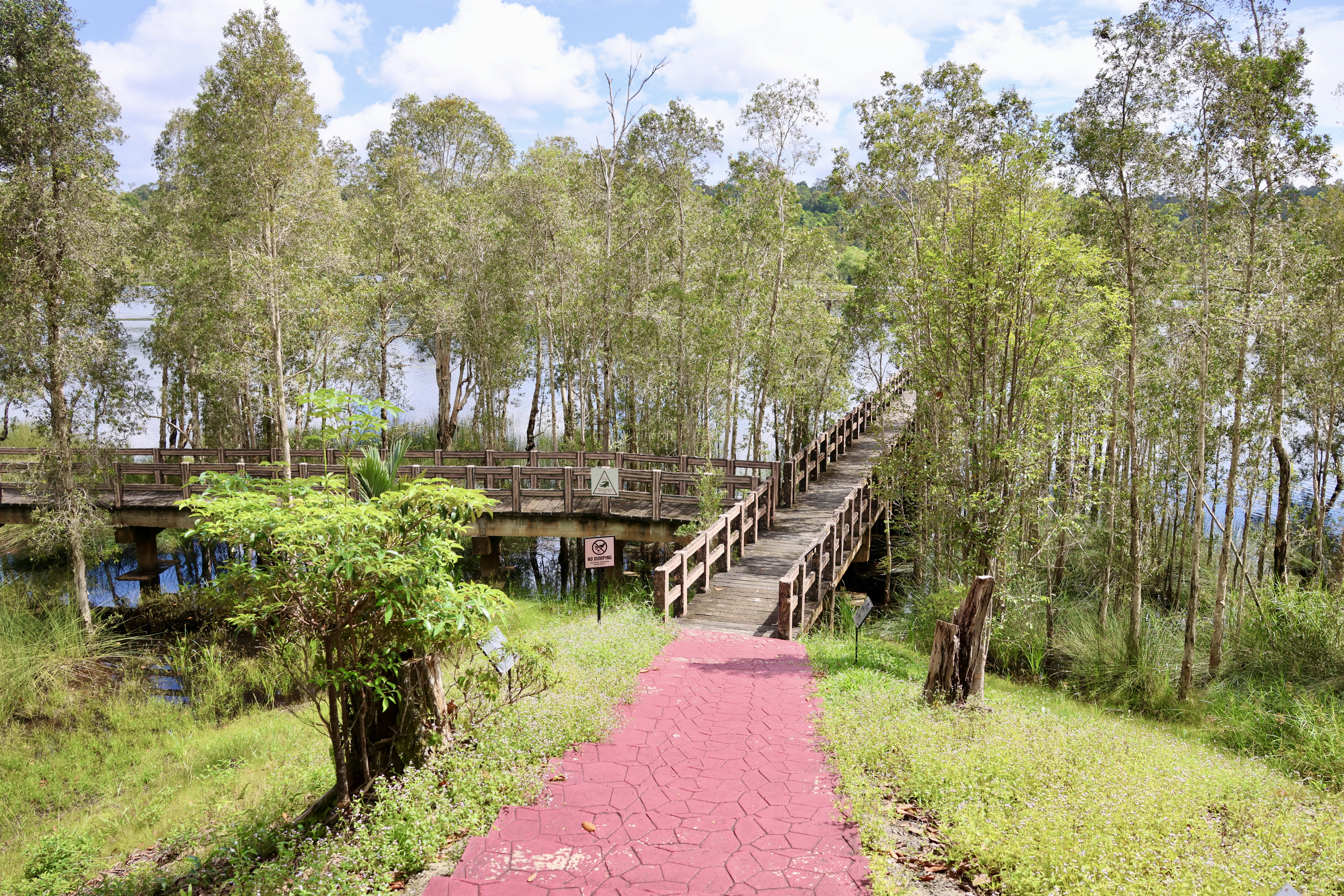
The park in 2024

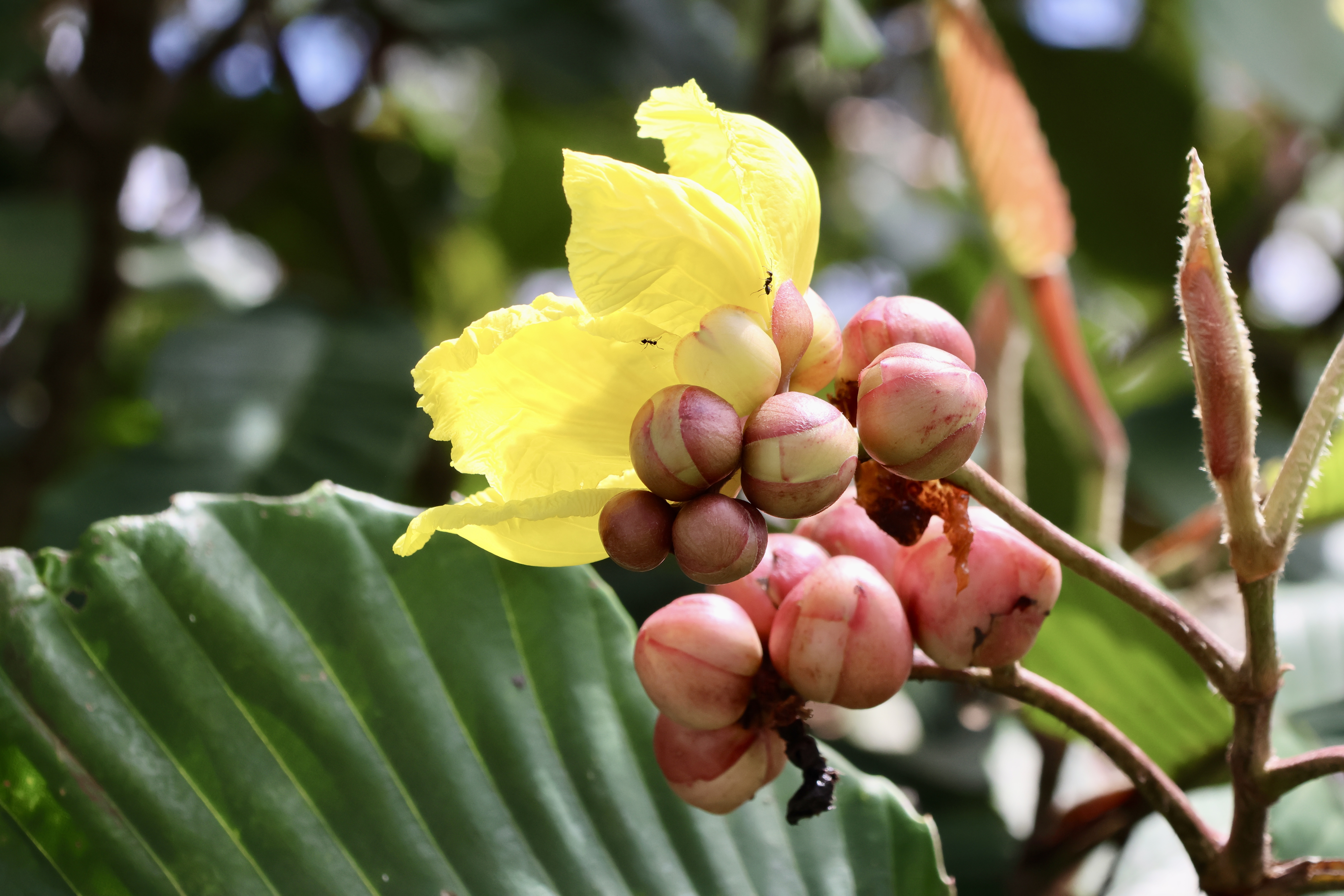
Dillenia suffruticosa fruit and flower

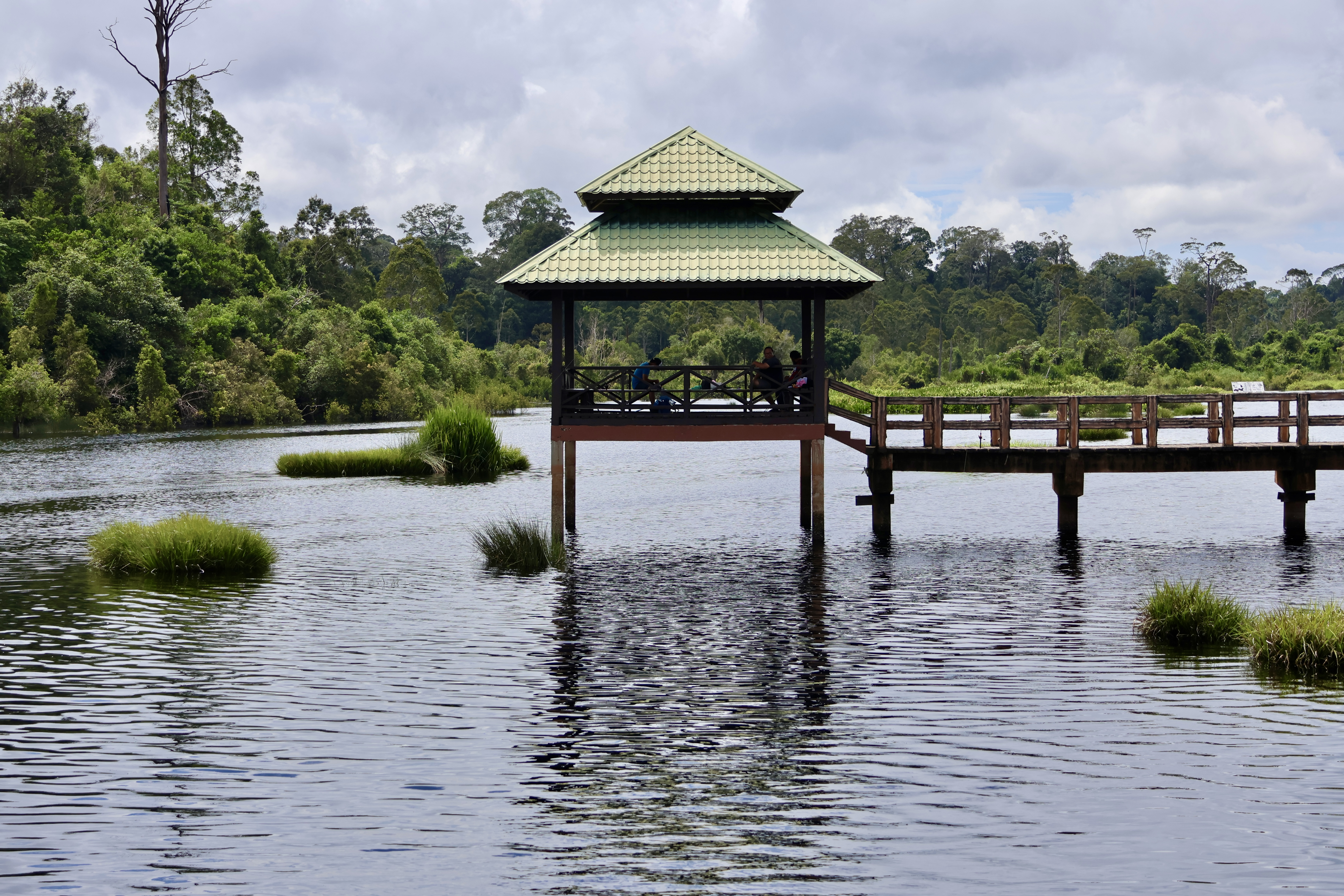
Gazebo surrounded by Lepironia articulata

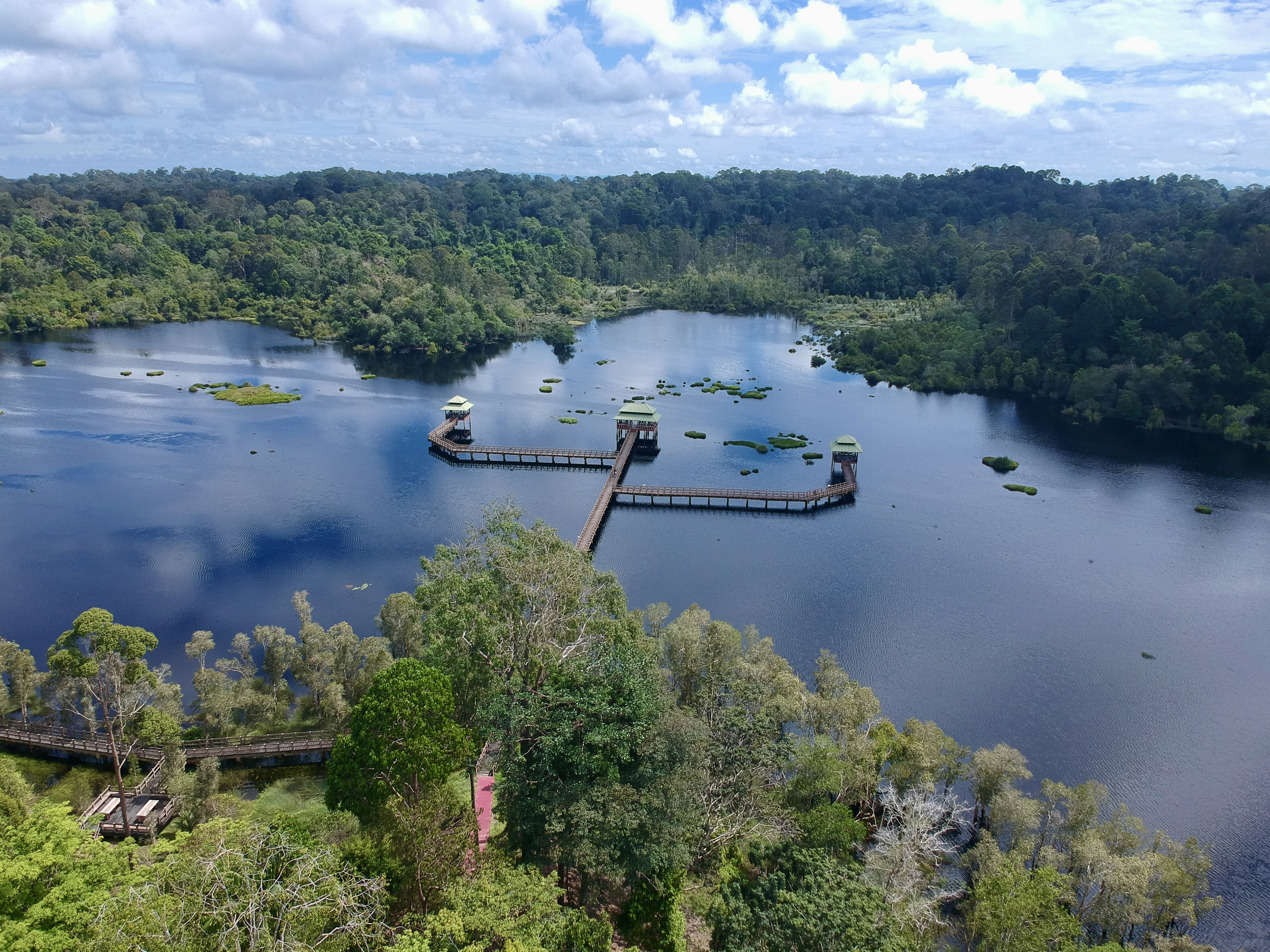
Lalak Lake from above

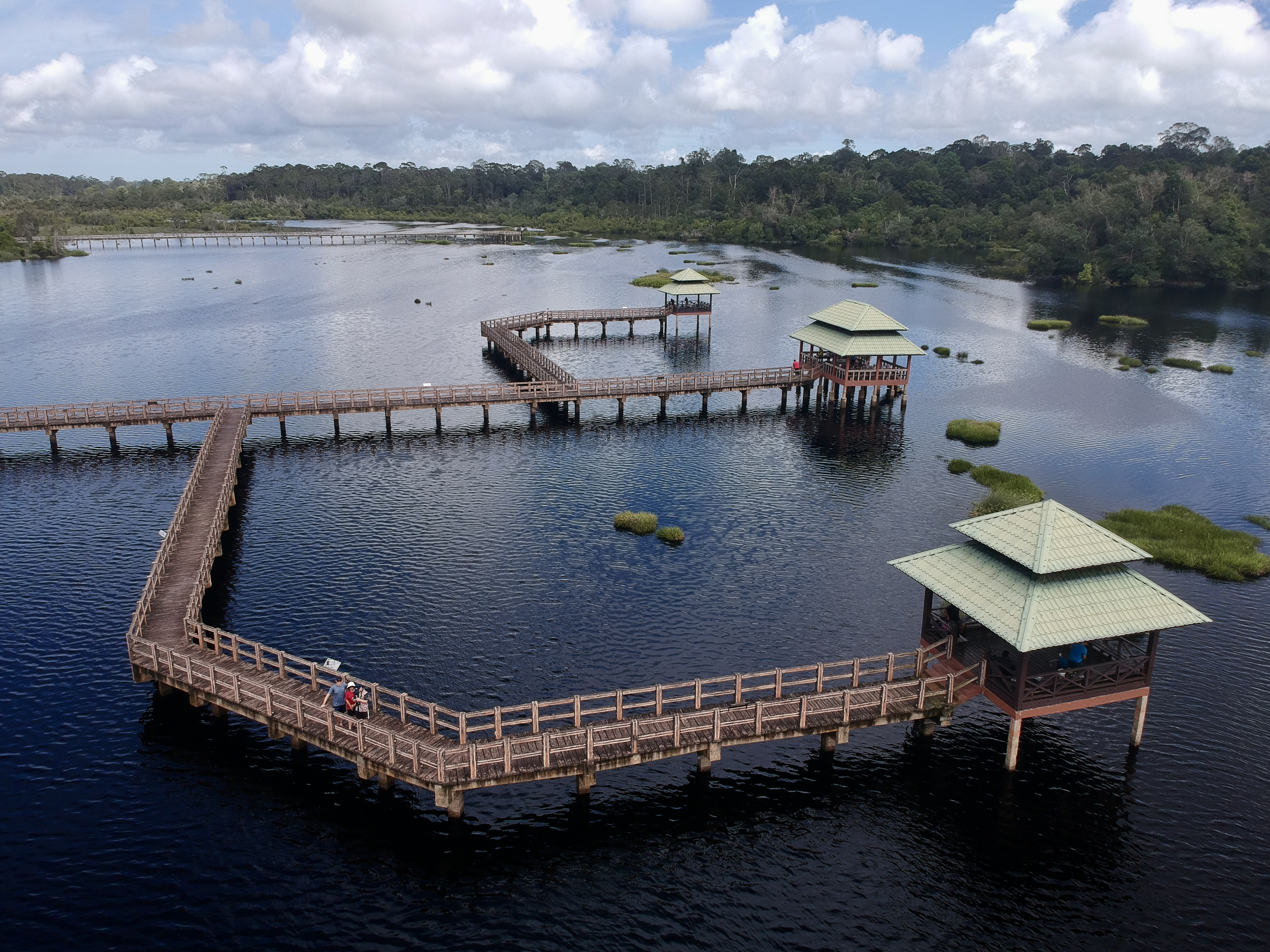
The three gazebos on stilts

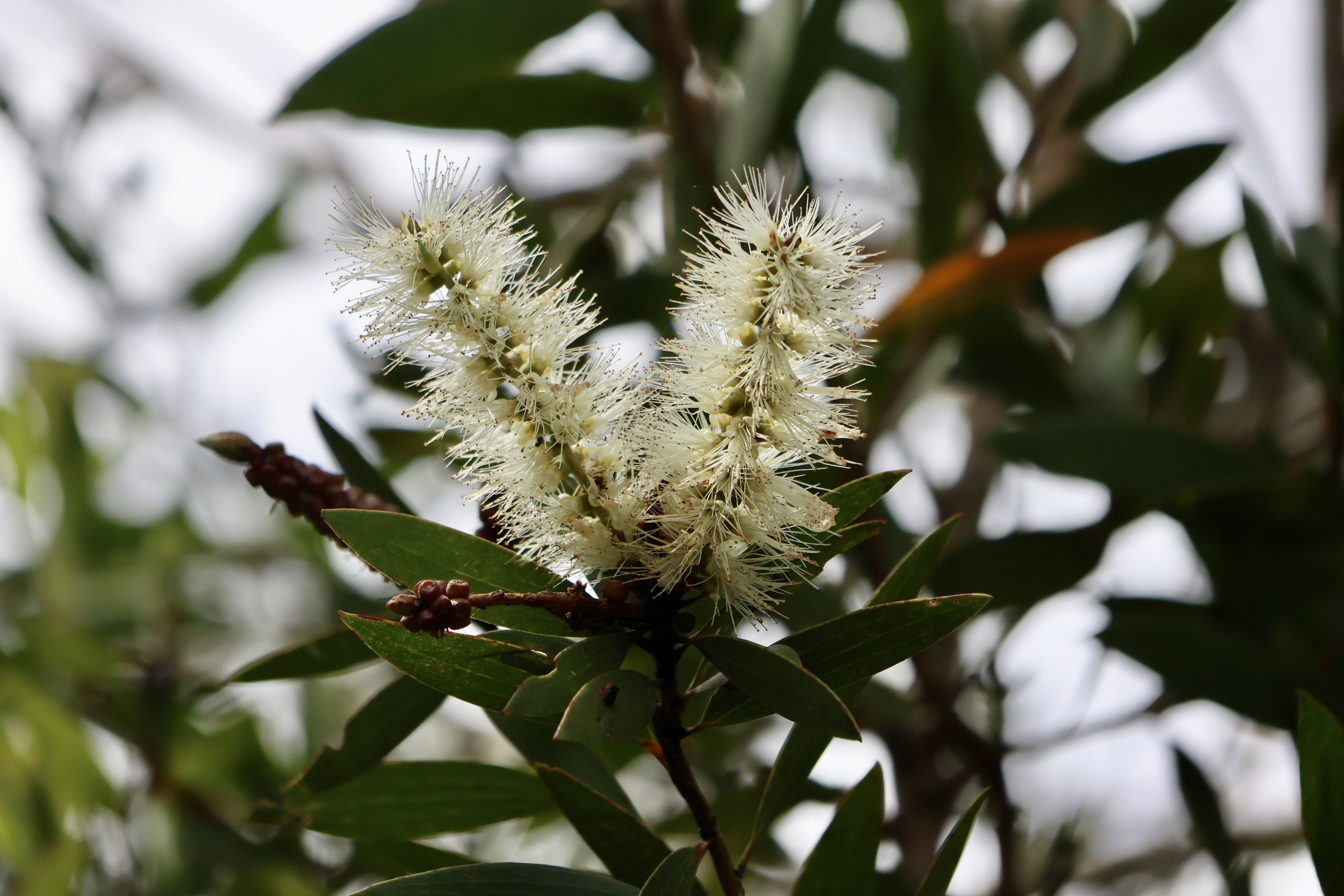
Melaleuca leucadendra

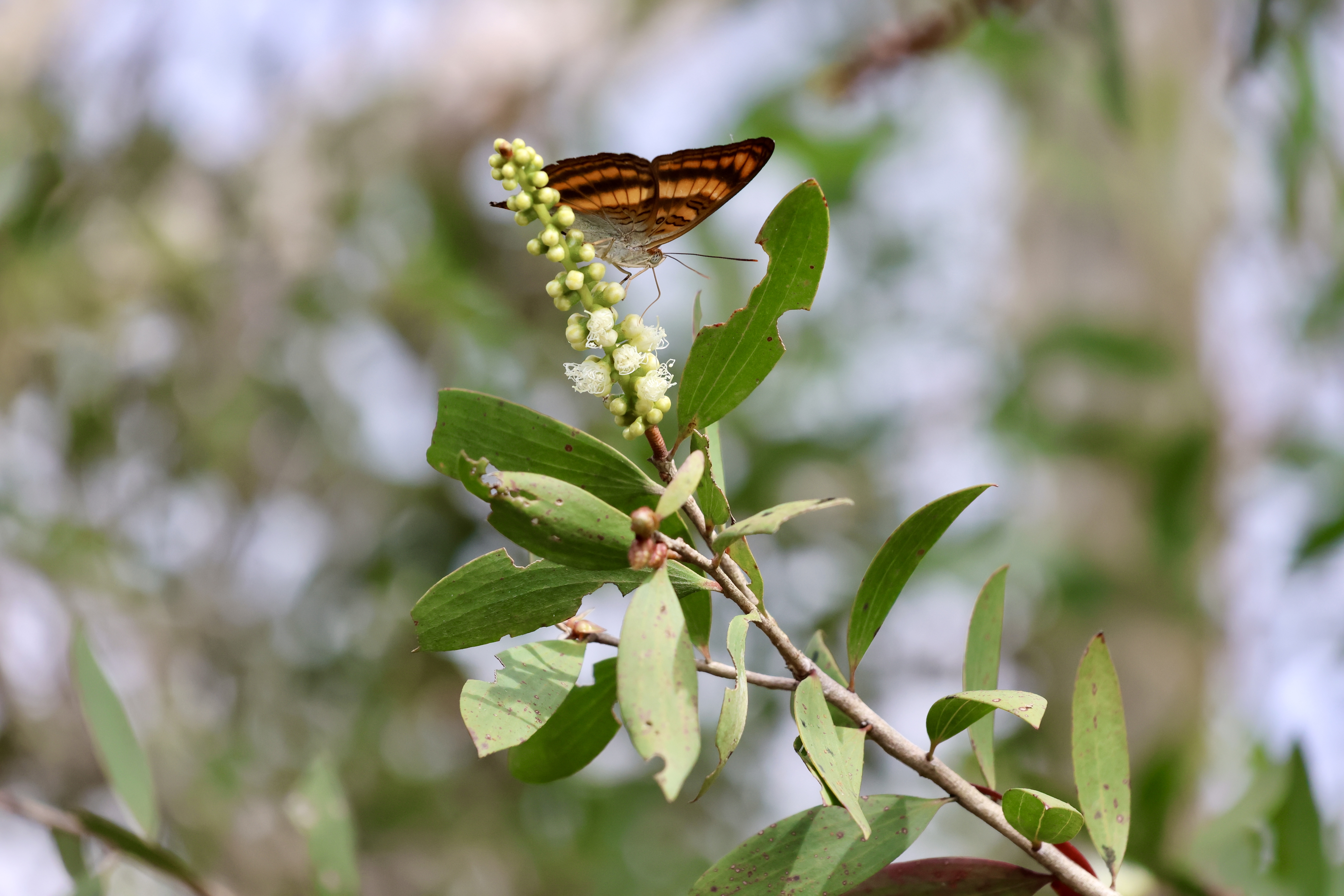
Pandita sinope on a Acacia melanoxylon

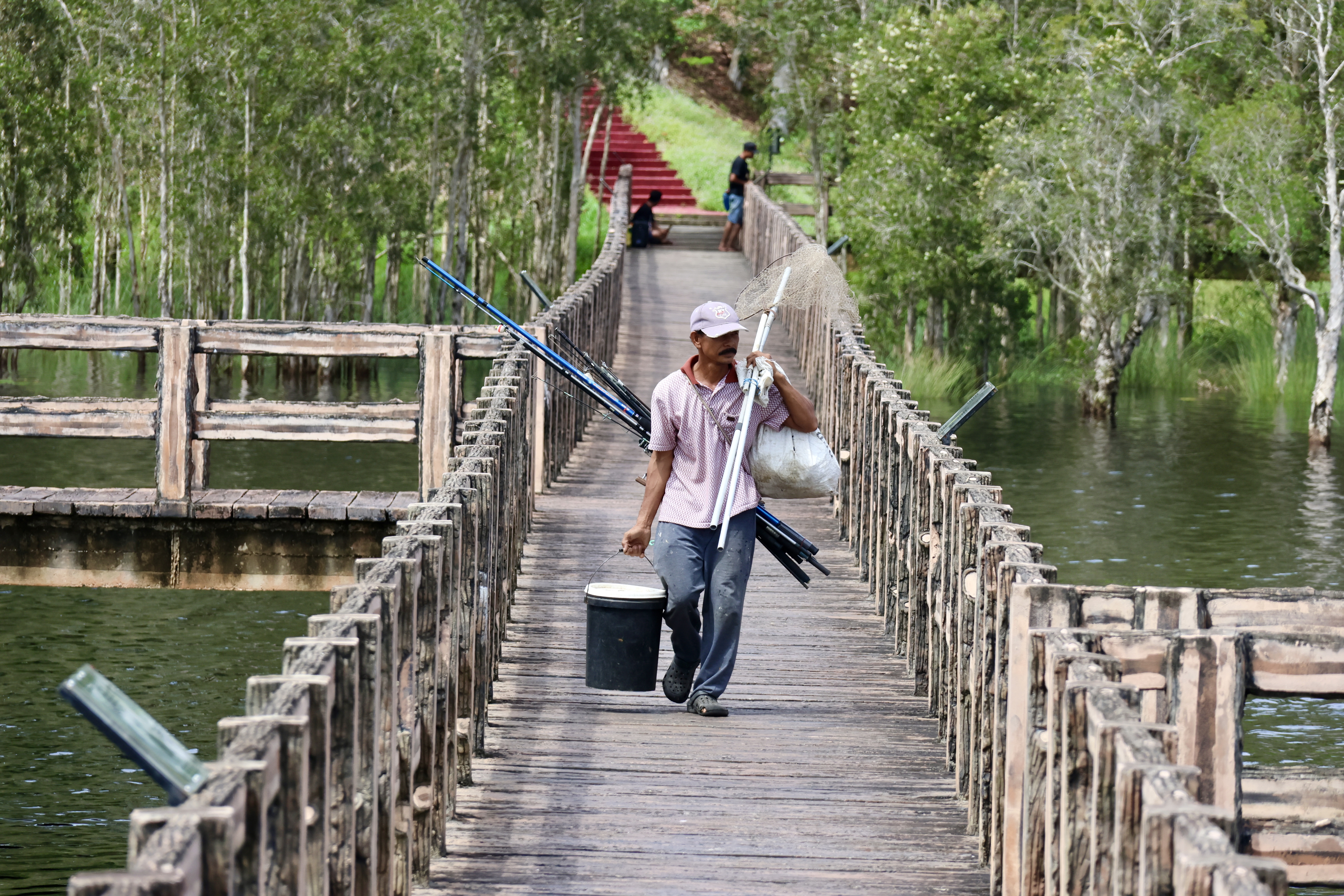
A fisherman at the park

== See also ==
- List of parks in Brunei Darussalam
- Protected areas of Brunei
