= Acacia mangium =

Black wattle

Conservation status
- Least Concern (IUCN 3.1)

Scientific classification
- Kingdom: Plantae
- Clade: Tracheophytes
- Clade: Angiosperms
- Clade: Eudicots
- Clade: Rosids
- Order: Fabales
- Family: Fabaceae
- Subfamily: Caesalpinioideae
- Clade: Mimosoid clade
- Genus: Acacia
- Species: A. mangium

Binomial name
- Acacia mangium Willd.
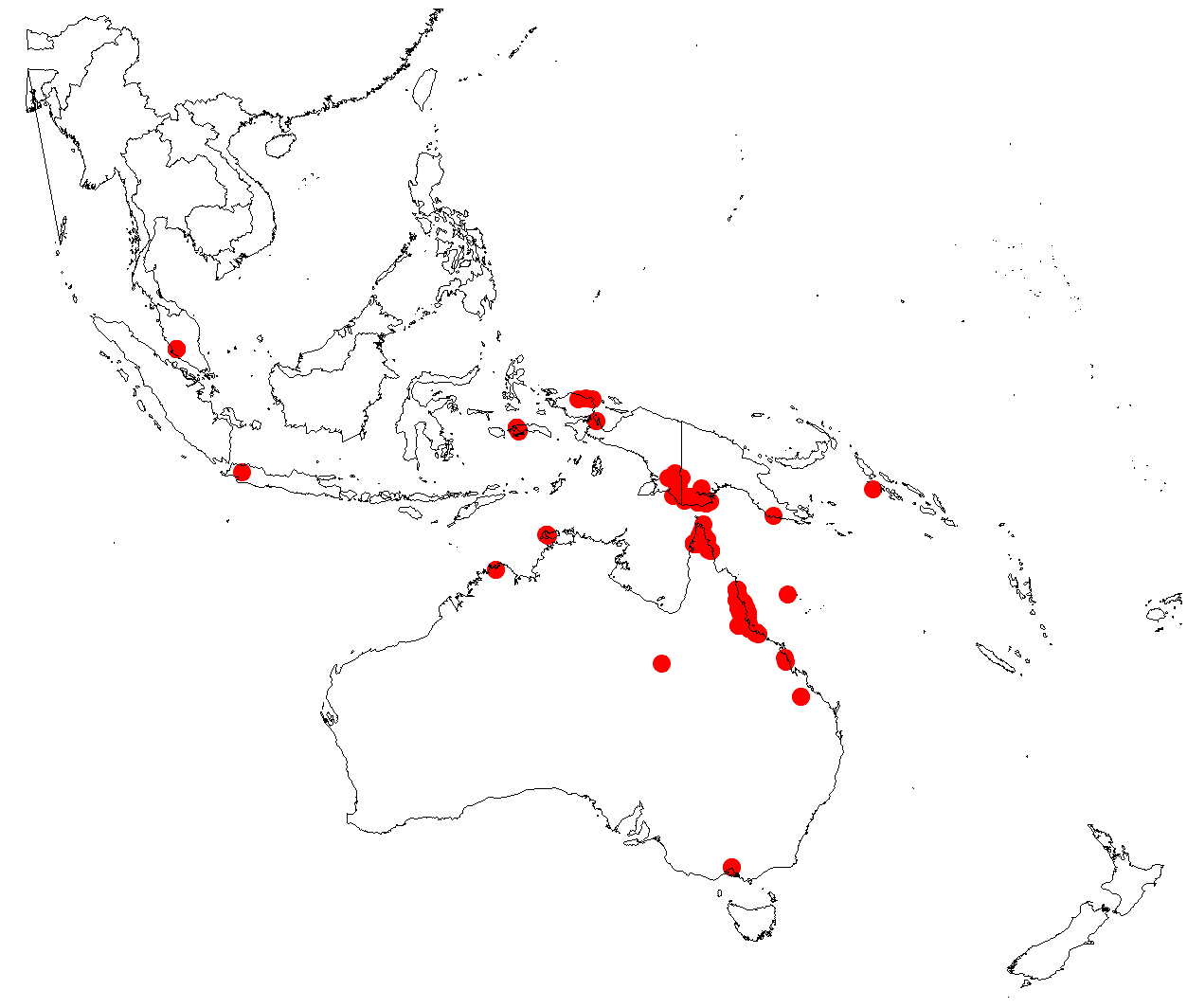
- Occurrence data from AVH

Synonyms
- Racosperma mangium (Willd.) Pedley; Acacia holosericea var. glabrata C.T.White

Species of legume

Pods in Madagascar

Habit in Thailand

Acacia mangium, usually commonly known as mangium, hickory wattle or black wattle, is a species of flowering plant in the family Fabaceae and is native to northeastern Queensland in Australia, the Western Province of Papua New Guinea, Papua, and the eastern Maluku Islands. It is a tree with rough, furrowed, pale grey to dark brown bark, glabrous, acutely angled, brown, fawn or green branchlets, obliquely narrowly elliptic to egg-shaped phyllodes, spikes of white to cream-coloured flowers, and irregularly coiled and twisted, or spirally coiled, leathery to more or less woody pods.

== Description ==
Acacia mangium is a tree that typically grows to a height of 7–30 m (23–98 ft), usually with a straight trunk that may occupy over half of the height of the tree. The bark is rough, longitudinally furrowed, pale grey to dark brown and the branchlets are glabrous, acutely angled, brown, fawn or green. The phyllodes are obliquely narrowly elliptic to egg-shaped with the narrower end towards the base, sometimes with the lower edge straight and the upper edge convex, 110–270 mm (4.3–10.6 in) long and 23–100 mm (0.91–3.94 in) wide. The phyllodes are thinly leathery or papery, dark green and glabrous, usually with about 4 prominent longitudinal veins. The flowers are usually borne in one or two spikes 50–120 mm (2.0–4.7 in) long in axils, on minutely hairy peduncles 6–10 mm (0.24–0.39 in) long. Flowering has been recorded from March to July, and the pods are more or less irregularly coiled and twisted, sometimes tightly spirally coiled, 3–6 mm (0.12–0.24 in) wide, glabrous and leathery to more or less woody. The seeds are oblong to slightly kidney-shaped, 3.5–5 mm (0.14–0.20 in) long and 2–3 mm (0.079–0.118 in) wide and black, with a stalk folded beneath the seed, expanded into a bright yellow or orange aril.

== Taxonomy ==
Acacia mangium was first formally described in 1806 by Carl Ludwig Willdenow in Species Plantarum from a specimen growing in the "Moluccas", from a description and illustration in Rumphius's Herbarium Amboinense. The specific epithet (mangium) is derived from the common name "mangi mangi geonong" that Rumphius used when he described this species as Mangium montanum.

== Uses ==
=== Horticulture ===
Acacia mangium has about 142,000 seeds/kg. To break down dormancy mature seed requires pre-germination treatments, such as mechanical scarification (scratching the surface) or boiling water. This treatment leads to fast germination and typically exceeds 75%. Like many other legumes, it is able to fix nitrogen in the soil. A. mangium is a popular species for forest plantation and agroforestry projects. In mixed cultures, plants can profit from shading by A. mangium and its nitrogen fixation. A. mangium will tolerate low fertility soils with impeded drainage, but prefers fertile sites with good drainage. Soil depth and topographic position can influence yields. With respect to distance from the equator, there are significant differences in performance under cultivation. A mean annual height increase of about 3 to 4 m is usual near the equator, whereas in areas further from the equator growth is slower.

=== Timber ===
Acacia mangium trees produce sapwood and heartwood. The heartwood's colour is brownish yellow shimmery and medium textured. Because the timber is extremely heavy, hard, very strong, tough, and not liable to warp and crack badly, it is used for furniture, doors and window frames. The glossy and smooth surface finish after polishing also leads to a potential for making export-oriented parquet flooring tiles and artifacts.

=== Pulp and paper ===
A. mangium has been recognized as an excellent source of short cellulose fibers for papermaking. It is grown in plantations in Southeast Asia, particularly Indonesia.

=== Soil management and ecological restoration ===
Because Acacia mangium trees increase the turnover rate of nitrogen in the topsoil, it can improve the nitrogen availability in soils in mixed cultures. Due to the fact that it is a very fast growing tree, it develops an intensive rooting system, particularly in low fertility soils. This helps to recover degraded tropical lands. The tree is widely used in Goa, India, in the mining industry for rehabilitation of waste dumps, as it is a drought-resistant species and binds sterile mine waste consisting of lateritic strata. In Colombia, it has been used for restoring wasteland created by open-pit gold mining.

== Chemistry ==
The gum contains 5.4% ash, 0.98% N, 1.49% methoxyl, and by calculation, 32.2% uronic acid. The sugar composition after hydrolysis: 9.0% 4-O-methylglucuronic acid, 23.2% glucuronic acid, 56% galactose, 10% arabinose, and 2% rhamnose.

== Gallery ==
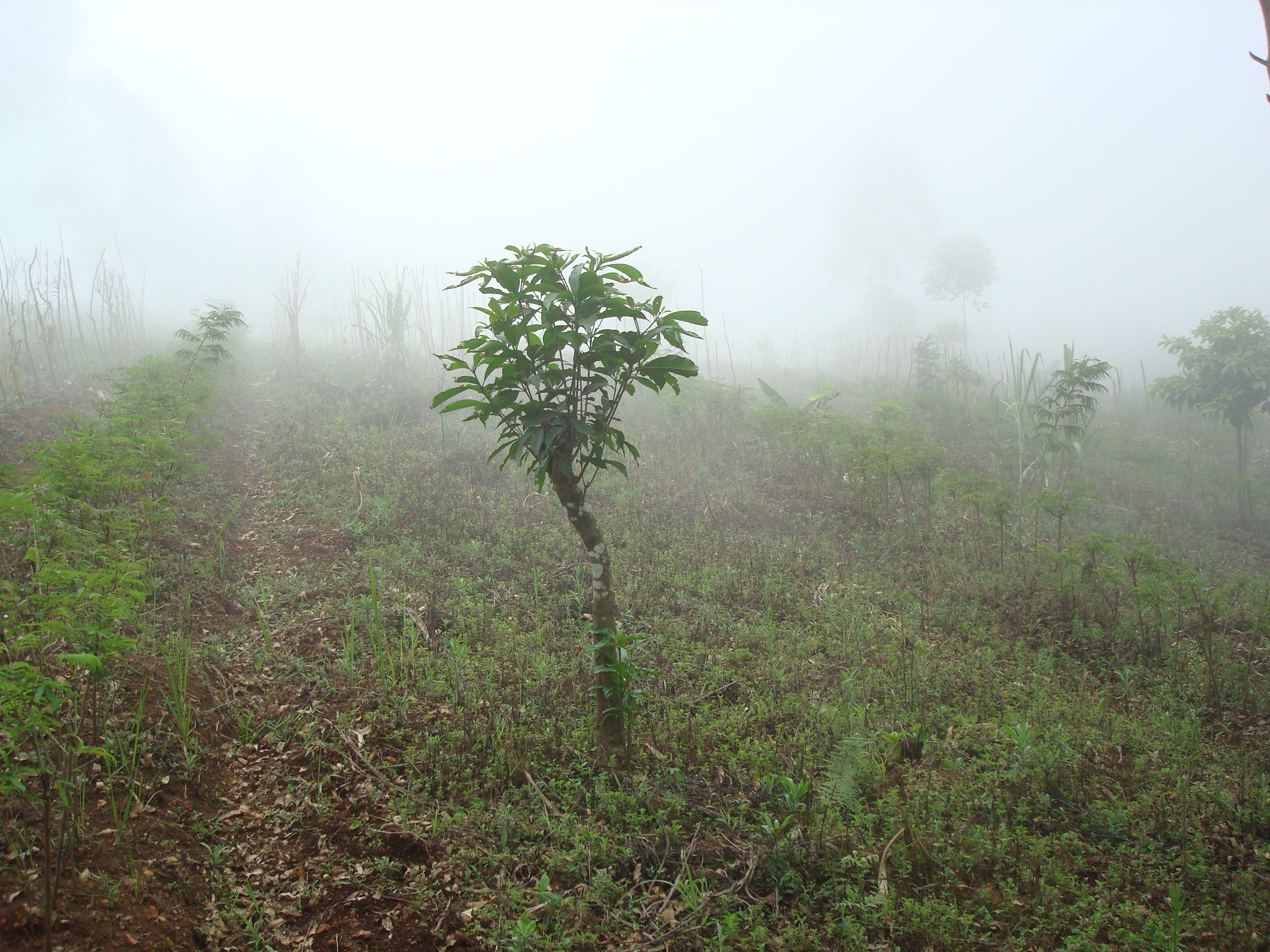
Cultivation in Africa

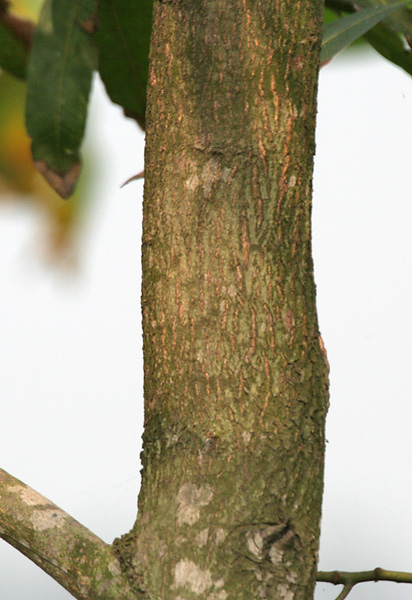
Trunk in Kolkata, India

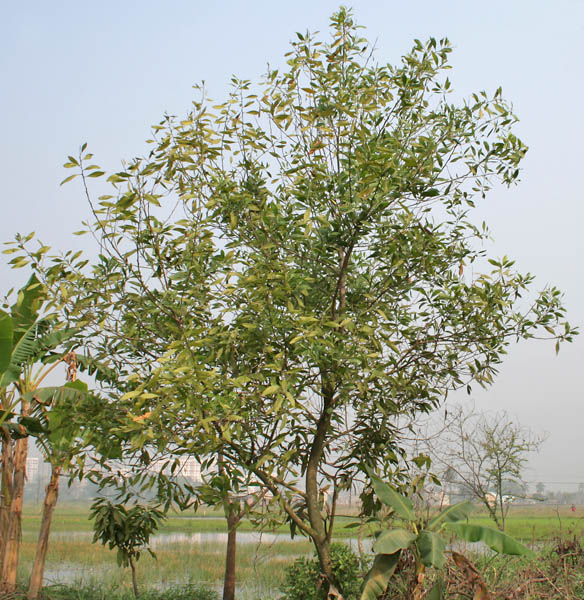
Tree in Kolkata, India.

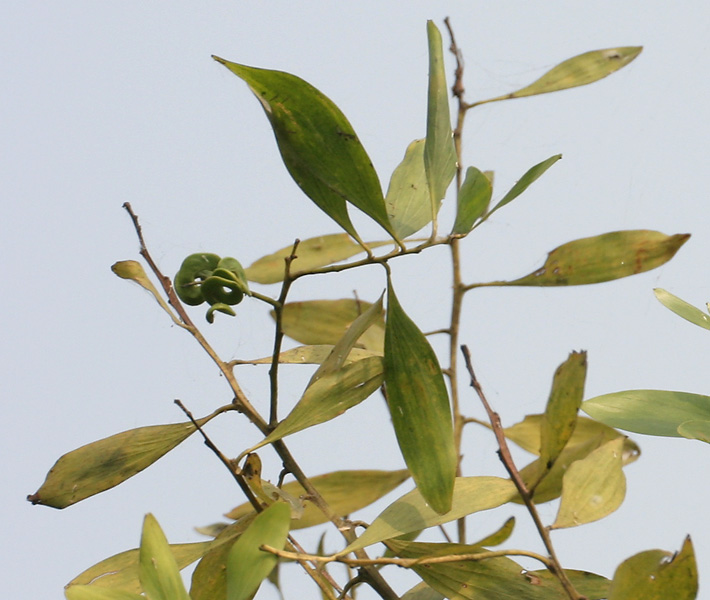
Leaves with fruit pod at canopy

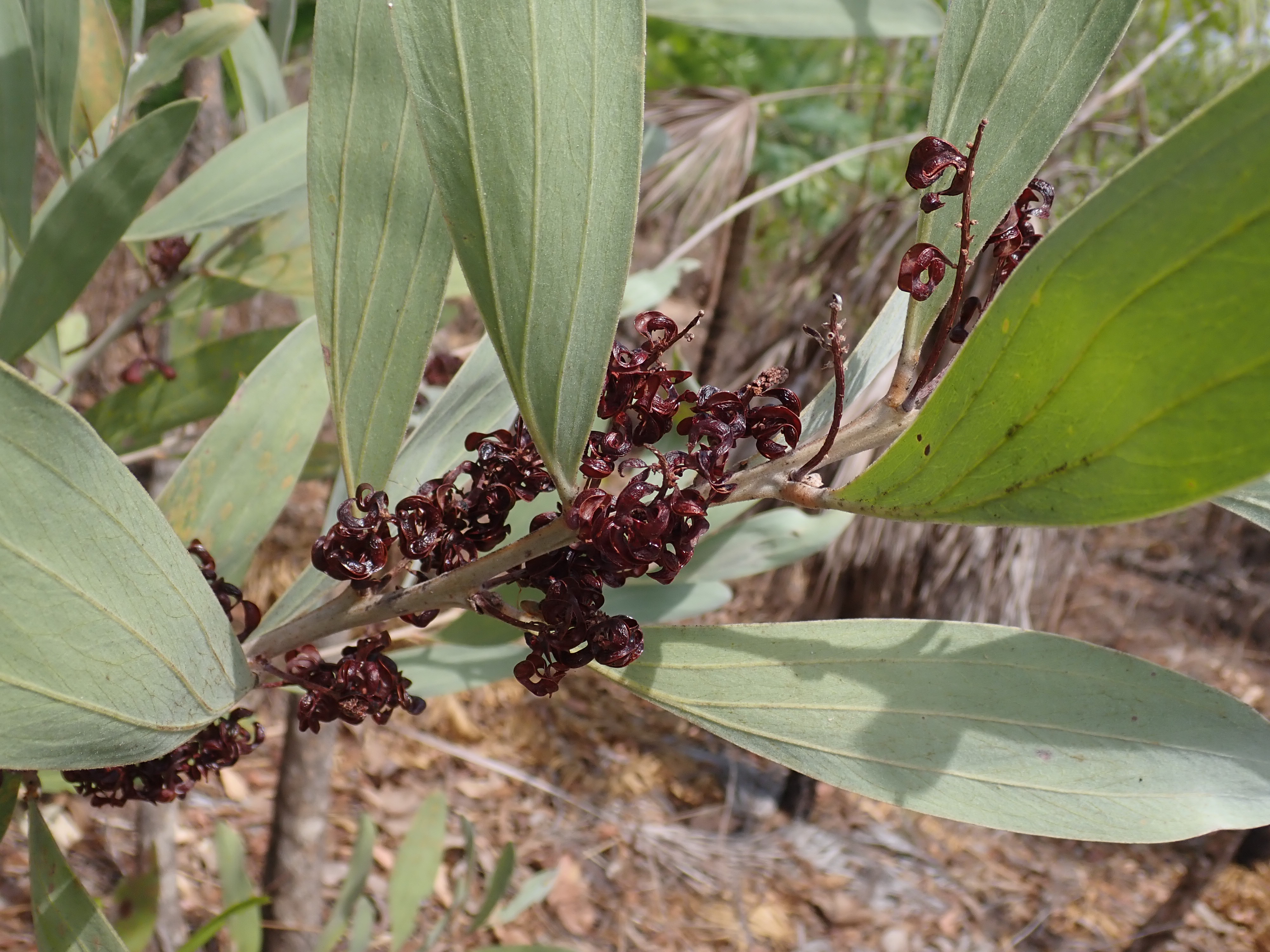
Leaves and pods

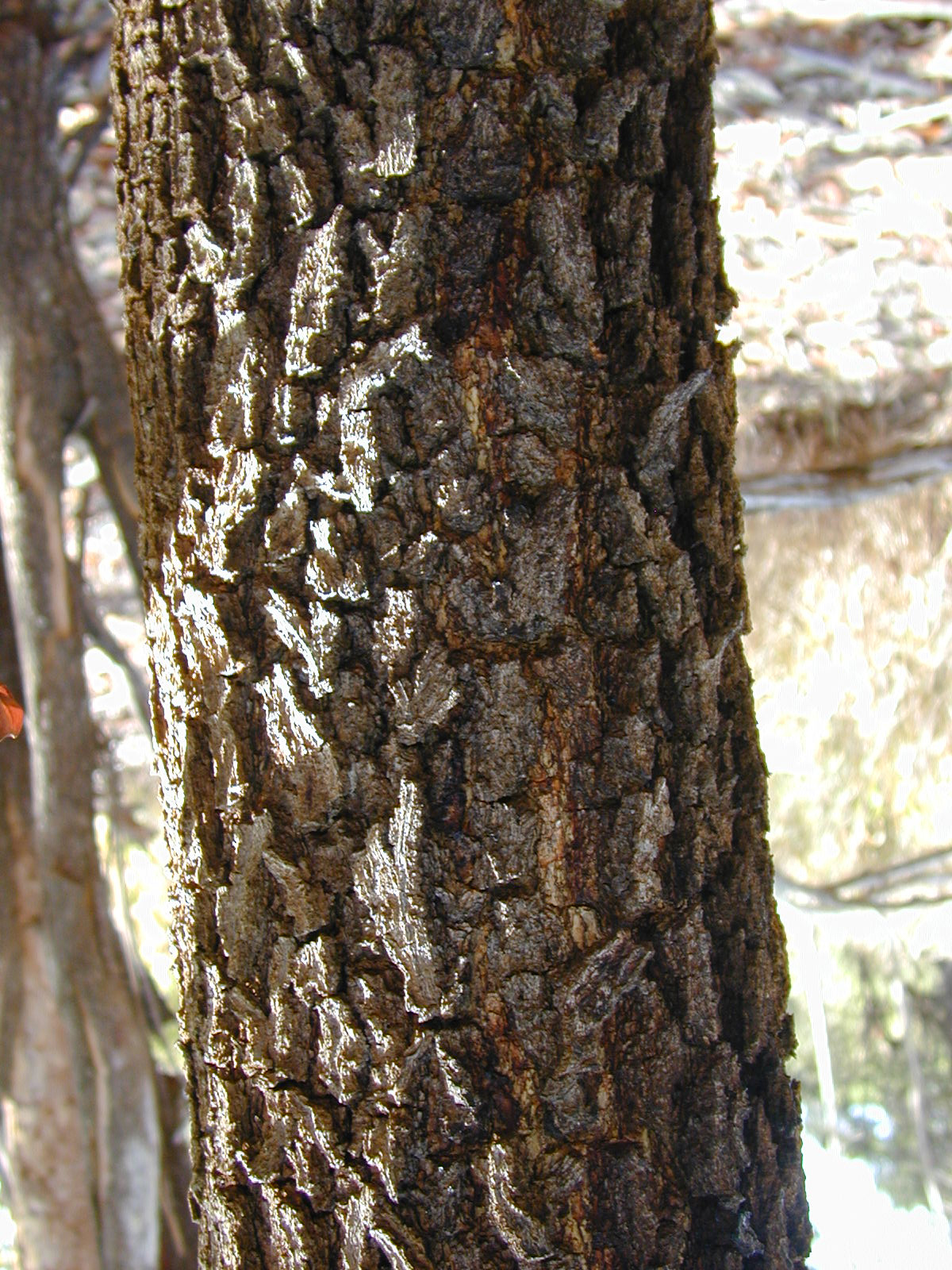
Old bark

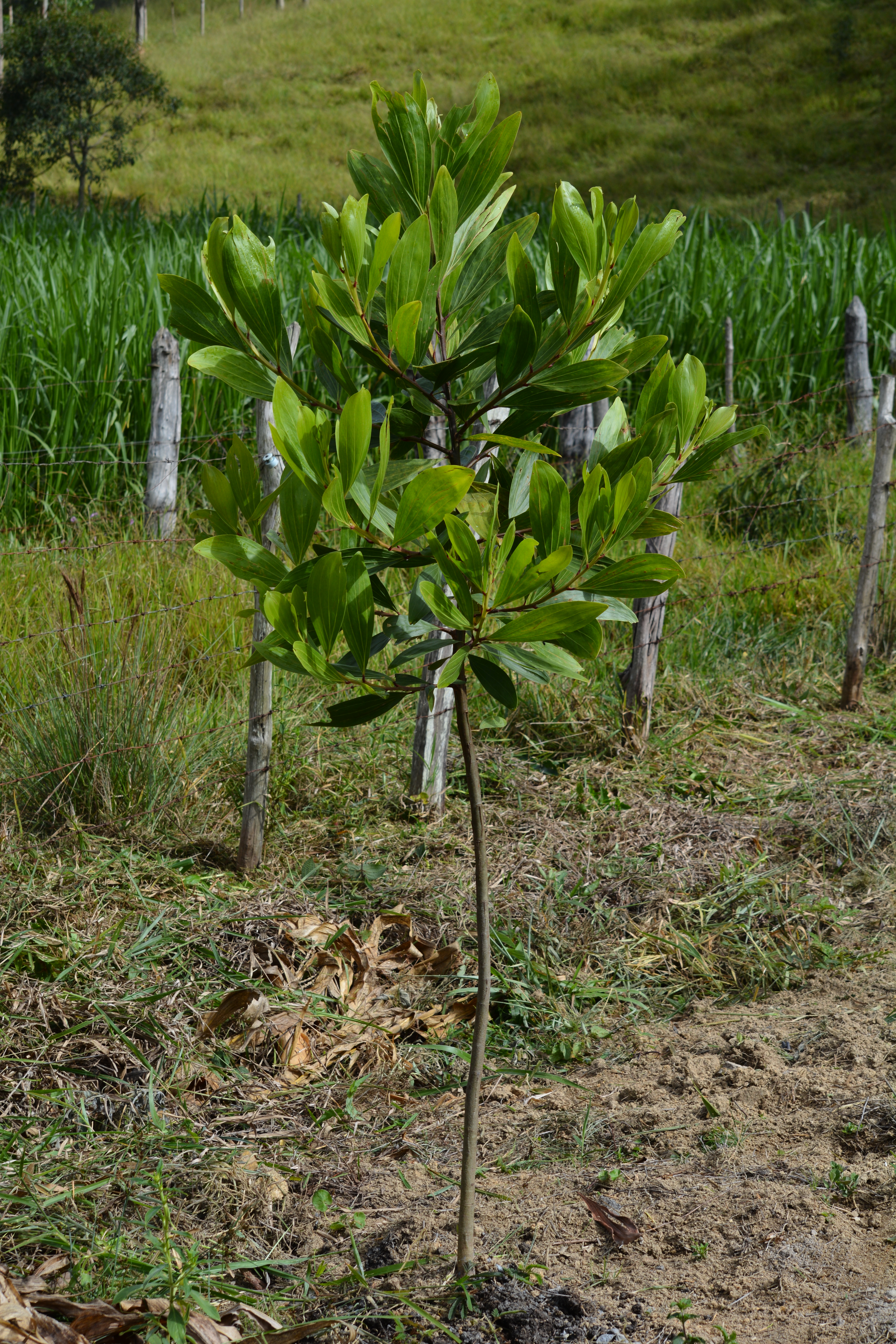
Leaves in young tree
