= Peradayan Forest Reserve =

Forest reserve in Brunei

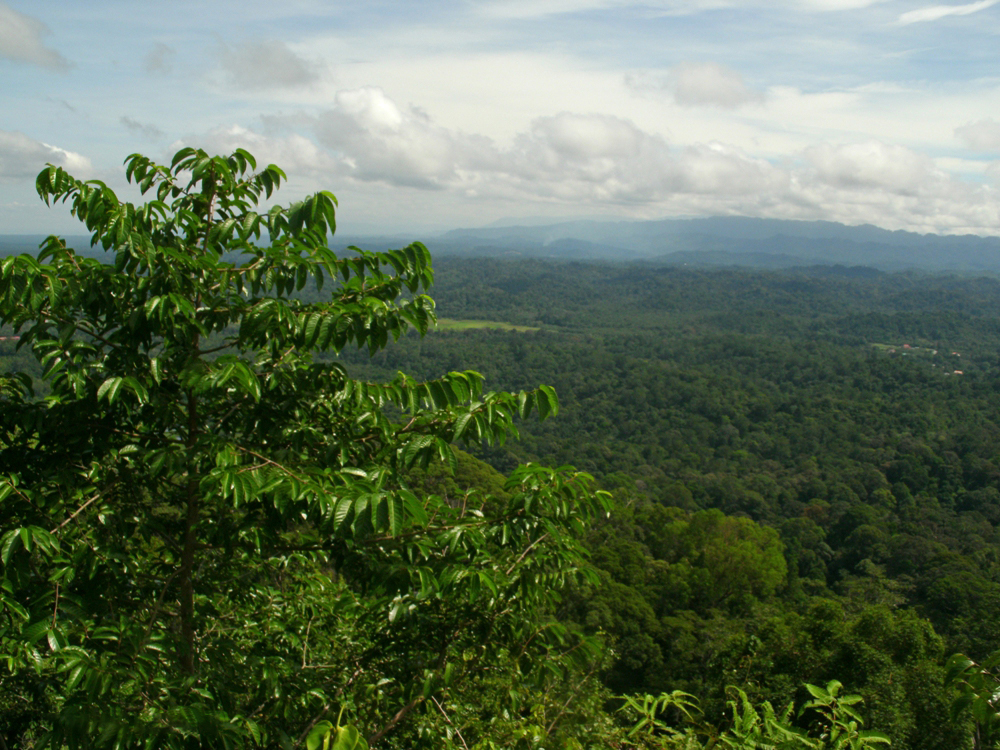

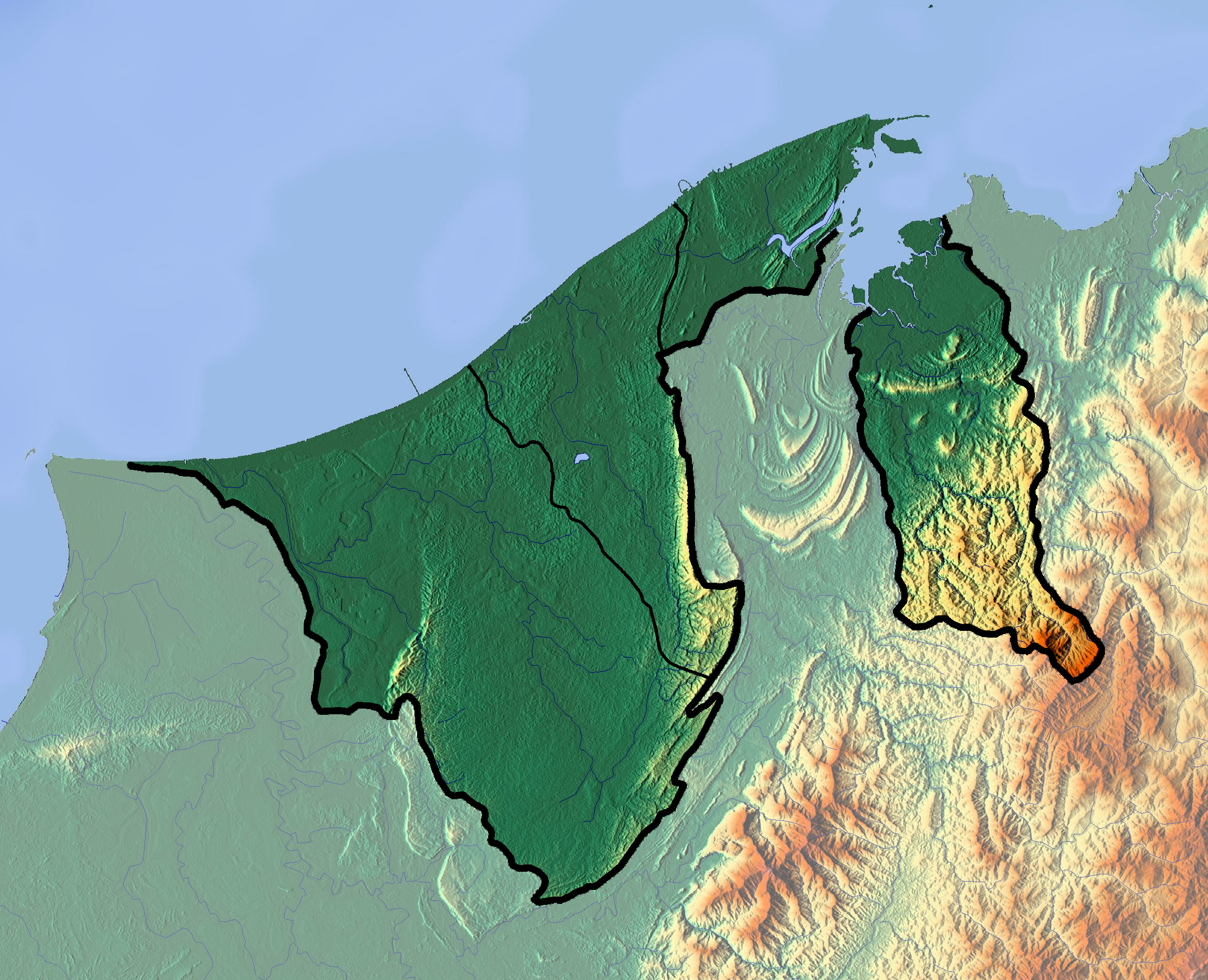
- Location within Brunei
- Location: Batu Apoi, Temburong
- Nearest city: Bandar Seri Begawan, Brunei-Muara
- Coordinates: 4.7500000°N 115.1666667°E
- Area: 2,650 hectares (6,500 acres)
- Governing body: Temburong District Office

Peradayan Forest Reserve is a 2,650 hectares (10.2 mi^{2}) nature reserve in Mukim Batu Apoi, Temburong District, Brunei. It is located about 15 km (9.3 mi) from Bangar town.

Perdayan Forest Recreation Park's 1,070 ha (2,600 acres) territory is home to a variety of readily seen wildlife such as Borneo`s native Kijang (deer). The reserve encompasses the twin hills of Bukit Perdayan (Perdayan Hill) which rises to 410 m (1,350 ft), and Bukit Patoi at 310 m (1,020 ft) above sea level. The patch of level stone on Bukit Patoi's summit is used as a helipad. It takes about two hours to negotiate the 1.6 km (1 mi) winding trek to the park. Perdayan Forest Recreation Park is situated on the road to Labu, approximately 15 km (9.3 mi) from Bangar town.

== Gallery ==
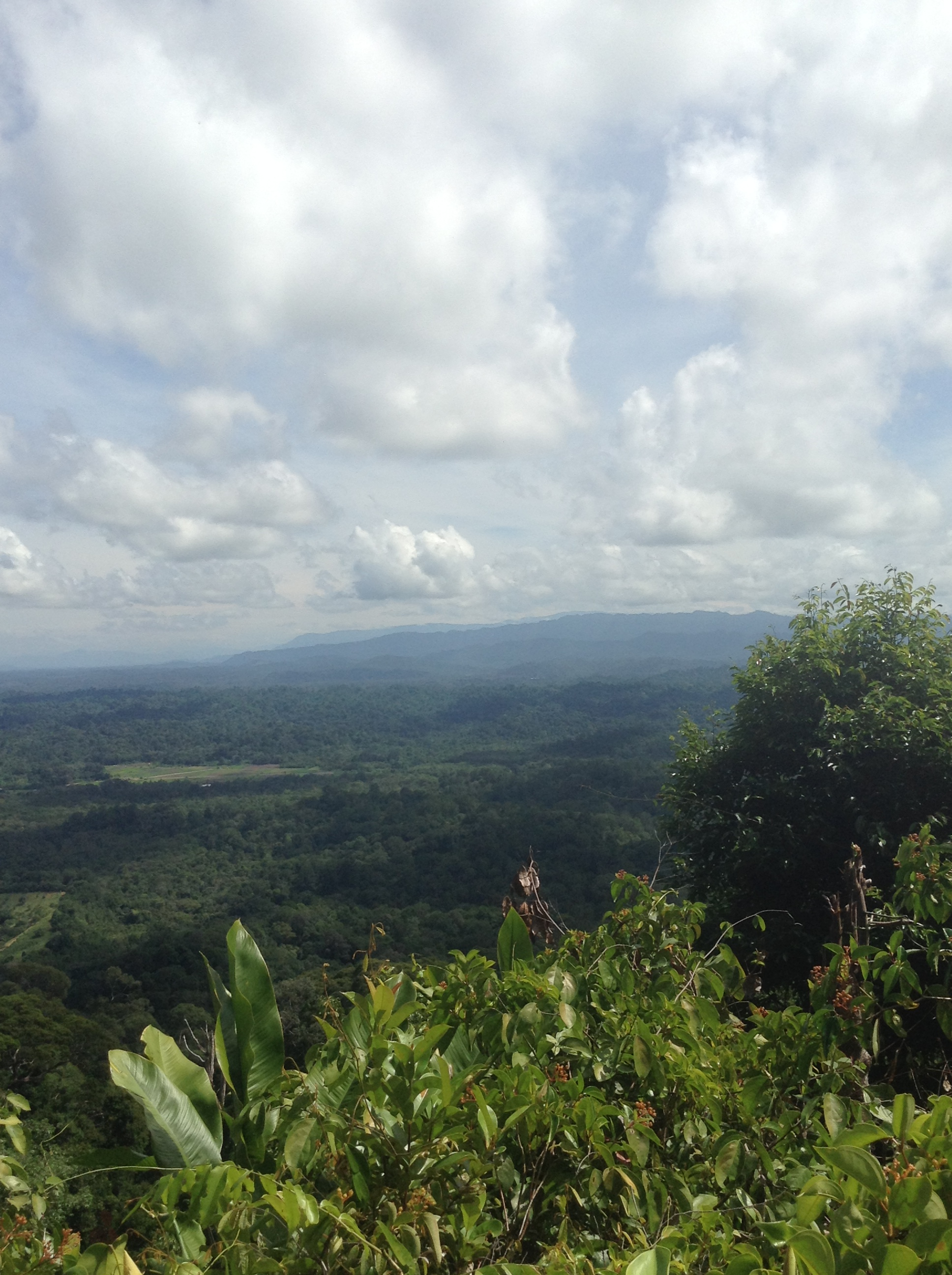
View from Bukit Patoi's peak

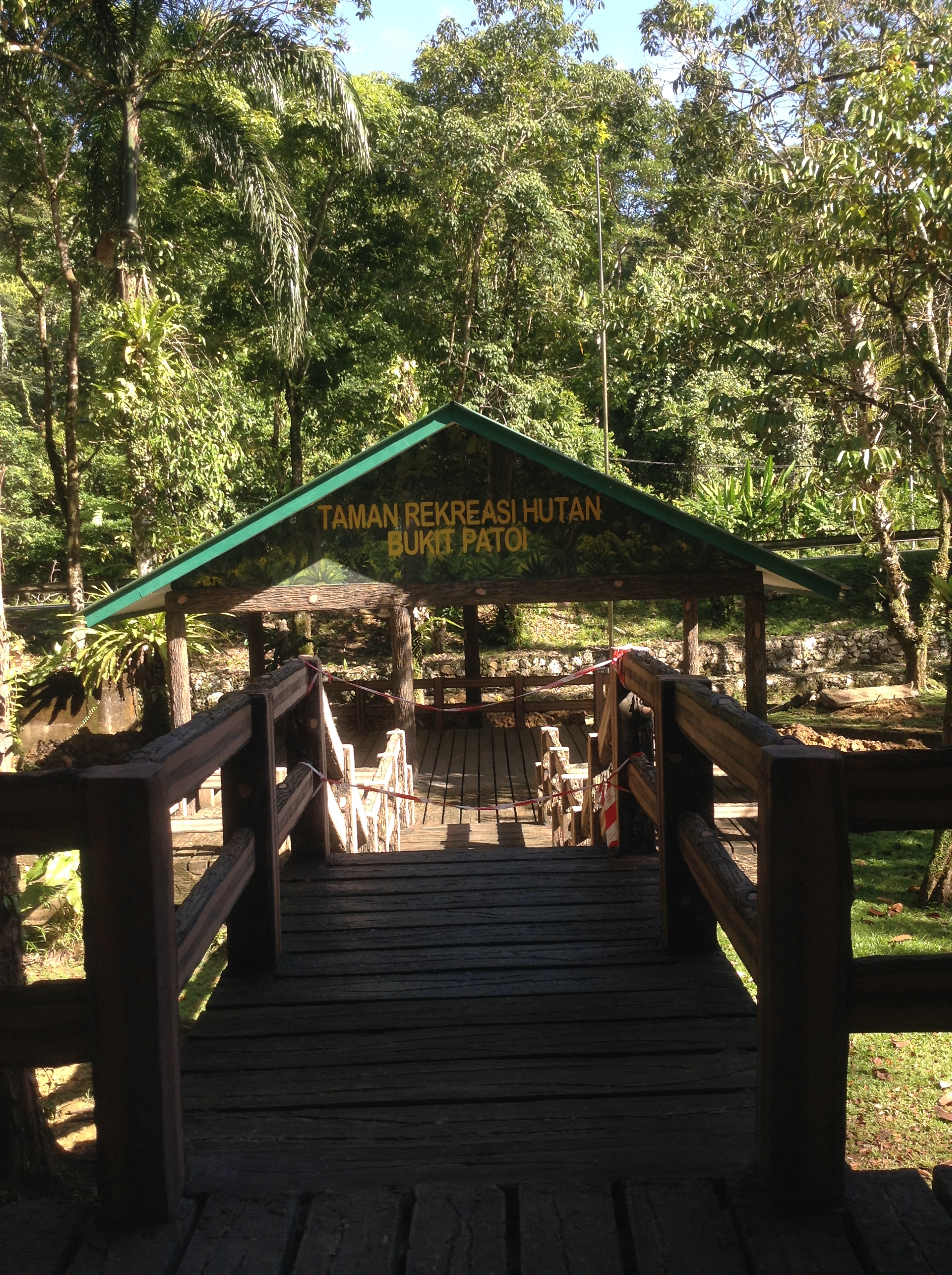
A shelter at Bukit Patoi

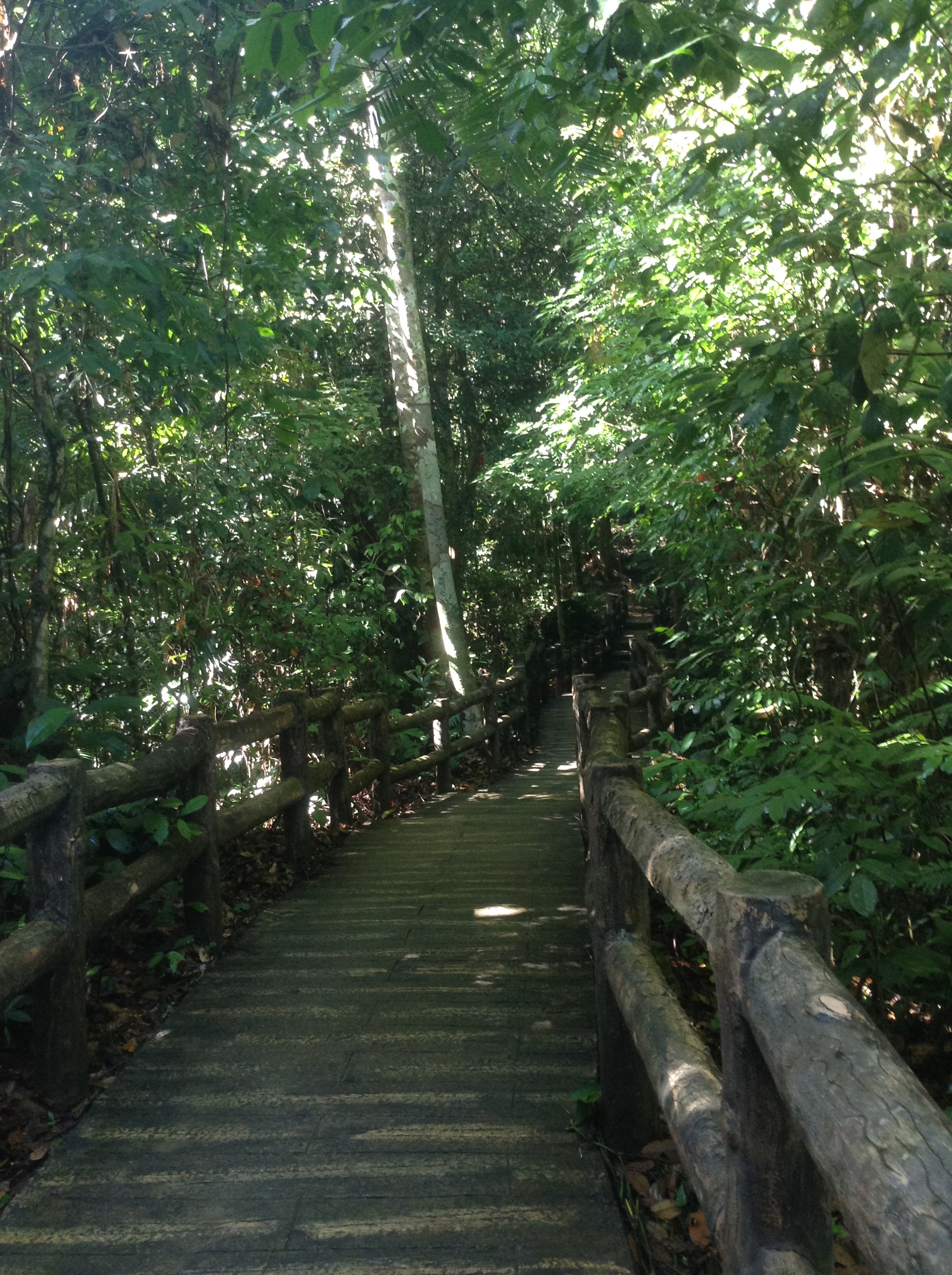
Forest walkway

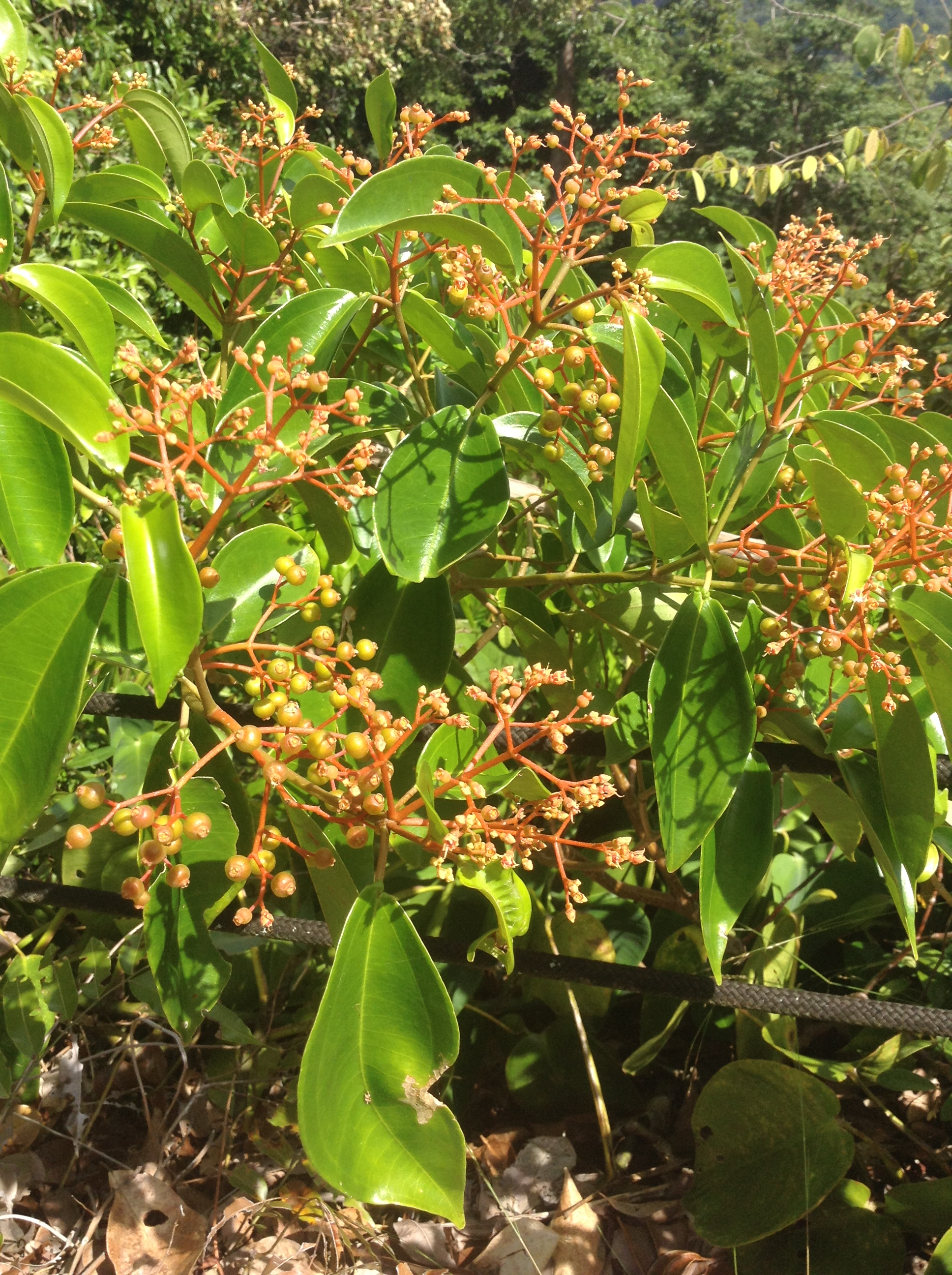
Pachycentria
