= Forestry Department =

Government agency of Brunei

Coordinates: 4.9191018°N 114.9439477°E

- Jabatan Perhutanan جابتن ڤرهوتنن

Agency overview
- Formed: March 1933; 93 years ago
- Jurisdiction: Government of Brunei
- Headquarters: Ministry of Primary Resources and Tourism, Jalan Menteri Besar, Bandar Seri Begawan, Brunei BB3910
- Minister responsible: Abdul Manaf Metussin, Minister of Primary Resources and Tourism
- Agency executive: Noralinda Ibrahim, Director
- Parent agency: Ministry of Primary Resources and Tourism
- Website: www.forestry.gov.bn

The Forestry Department (Malay: Jabatan Perhutanan; Jawi: جابتن ڤرهوتنن), also referred to as the Forest Department, is a department overseen by the Ministry of Primary Resources and Tourism (MPRT). Through the department practices sustainable forest management to ensure that forest resources can be used and utilized continuously in addition to balancing environmental, economic and social interests as well as the well-being of the people and the country.

== Background ==
The department's goal is to boost production in the forest business while focusing on exports and using Sustainable Forest Management techniques. With the aim of promoting local and foreign direct investment (FDI), as well as concentrating on raising productivity and producing high-value products, while emphasizing environmental stability and social needs, the forest industry's output growth is to be accelerated. To increase the productivity of primary industry by utilizing cutting-edge technology and best practices while ensuring environmental sustainability and sustainable timber resources for the timber industry. It is also aimed to increase the output of the forestry industry to contribute to GDP growth, economic diversification, and export growth.

Brunei is regarded as one of the nations with a high forest cover and has a diversified ecology. Tropical evergreen rain forests, which make up the majority of the country's natural vegetation and are thought to cover over 75% of its total geographical area, are present across the nation. 41% of the nation's total land area is made up of legally designated national forest reserves. These woods' intact forest structures and ecological diversity, distinctive terrain, regions used for forest production and recreation, and other specific uses are of national significance.

== Legislation ==
=== Forest Act (1939) ===
Part I Preliminary; Part II Reserved Forests; Part IIA Licence and Use Permit; Part IIB Forest Development Fund; Part III Penalties and Procedures; and Part IV Rules make up the Act. It offers protection for forests and the things they produce. The Reserved Forests must be divided into zones and subject to limitations on activities like as cutting down trees, gathering firewood or samples, harvesting fruit or honey, letting cattle graze, and removing stones or minerals, all of which are considered to be forest products.

=== Land Acquisition Act (1949) ===
The Act enables the State to compel the acquisition of private land for public use. It controls the methods of acquisition, payment, vesting, etc. The Forestry Department is one example of a government agency that typically oversees and manages the Gazetted Lands. The Ministry of Development's Land Department has legal jurisdiction over the management of land throughout the nation, unless the law provides otherwise.

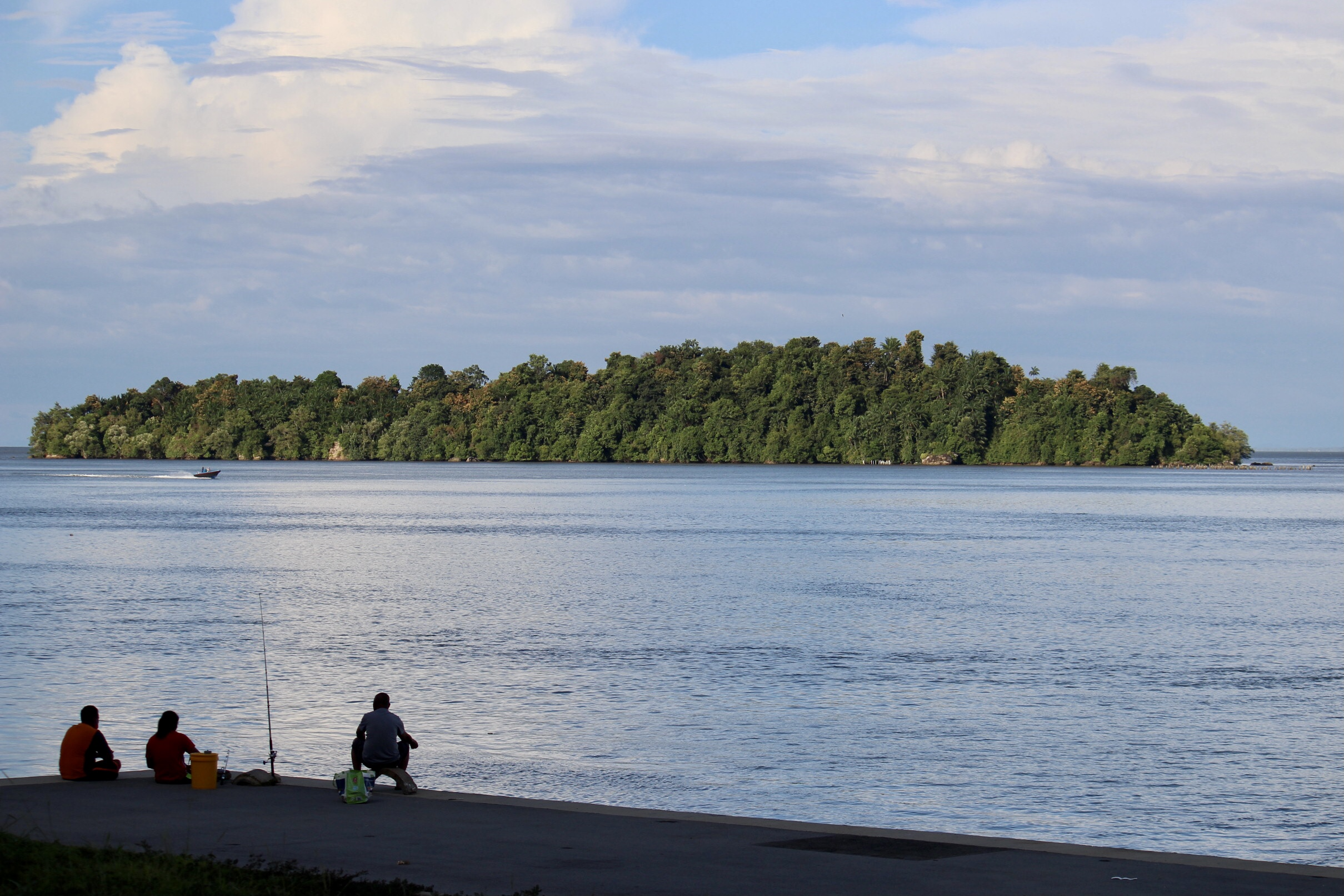
Chermin Island, one of the locations within the Antiquities and Treasure Trove Act.

=== Antiquities and Treasure Trove Act (1967) ===
Act to govern the law relating to treasure troves, to provide for the supervision and preservation of historical monuments, archaeological sites, and artifacts, as well as for things related thereto. Provides for the protection of historical sites and antiquities, which includes any object that can be moved or is immobile, or a portion of a site, river, lake, or sea that was constructed, designed, drawn, dug, extracted, or moved by man at one time or thought to date back to before 1 January 1894; and any human skeletons or plant or animal remains (including fossils) that date back to or are thought to date back to that date.

=== Town and Country Planning Act (1972) ===
Plans for national development, particularly in relation to the distribution of land for habitation, industry, and other uses. The Town and Country Planning Unit of the Ministry of Development has jurisdiction over this Act.

=== Wildlife Protection Act (1978) ===
The Act establishes wildlife sanctuaries even in protected or reserved forests and protects wild life by limiting hunting seasons, animal age ranges, and hunting techniques. In this Act, "Game Officer" refers to any officer appointed under Section 3 who is a Chief Game Warden, Deputy Chief Game Warden, a Game Warden, or a Game Ranger; "State Land" has the meaning assigned to it by the Land Code; "hunt," "kill," or "capture" refer to hunting, killing, or capturing by any method, and includes attempts to kill or capture as well as the taking or disturbing of nests or eggs; and "protected animal". Any protected animal may not be hunted, killed, or captured unless under and in compliance with the terms of a license given under this Act: a fine of $2,000 and a year in jail as a penalty. Additionally, unless the animal has been lawfully acquired, no one, other than the holder of an appropriate licence issued under this Act, shall sell or offer for sale, or have in his possession, any protected animal, any trophy, or its flesh. Violations carry a six-month jail sentence and a $1,000 fine.

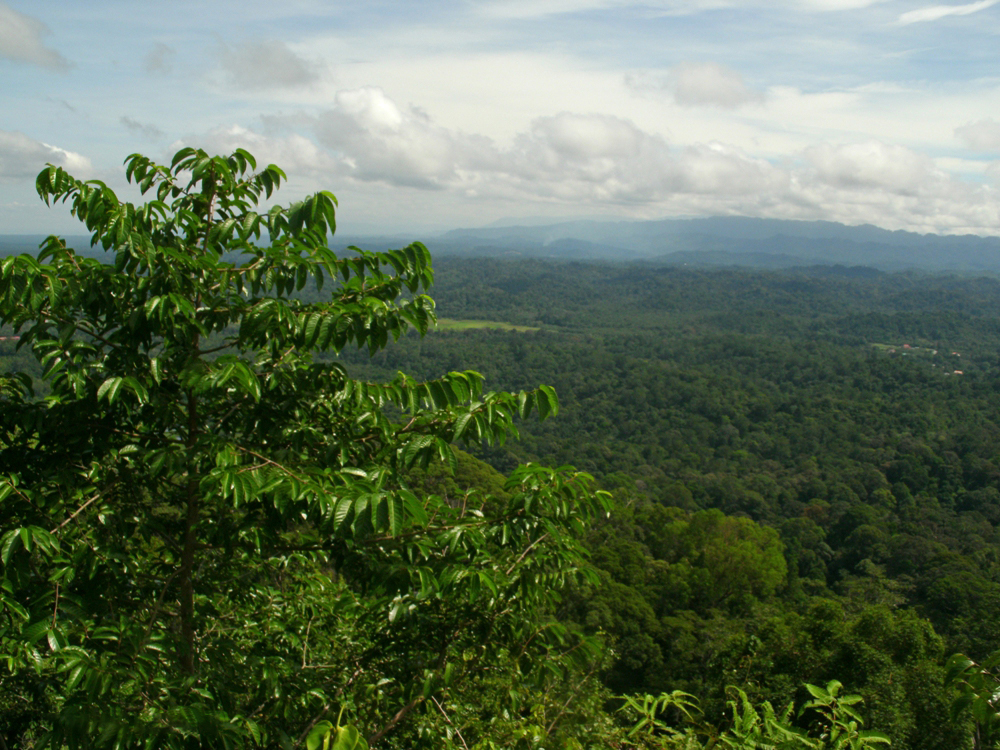
Peradayan Forest Reserve

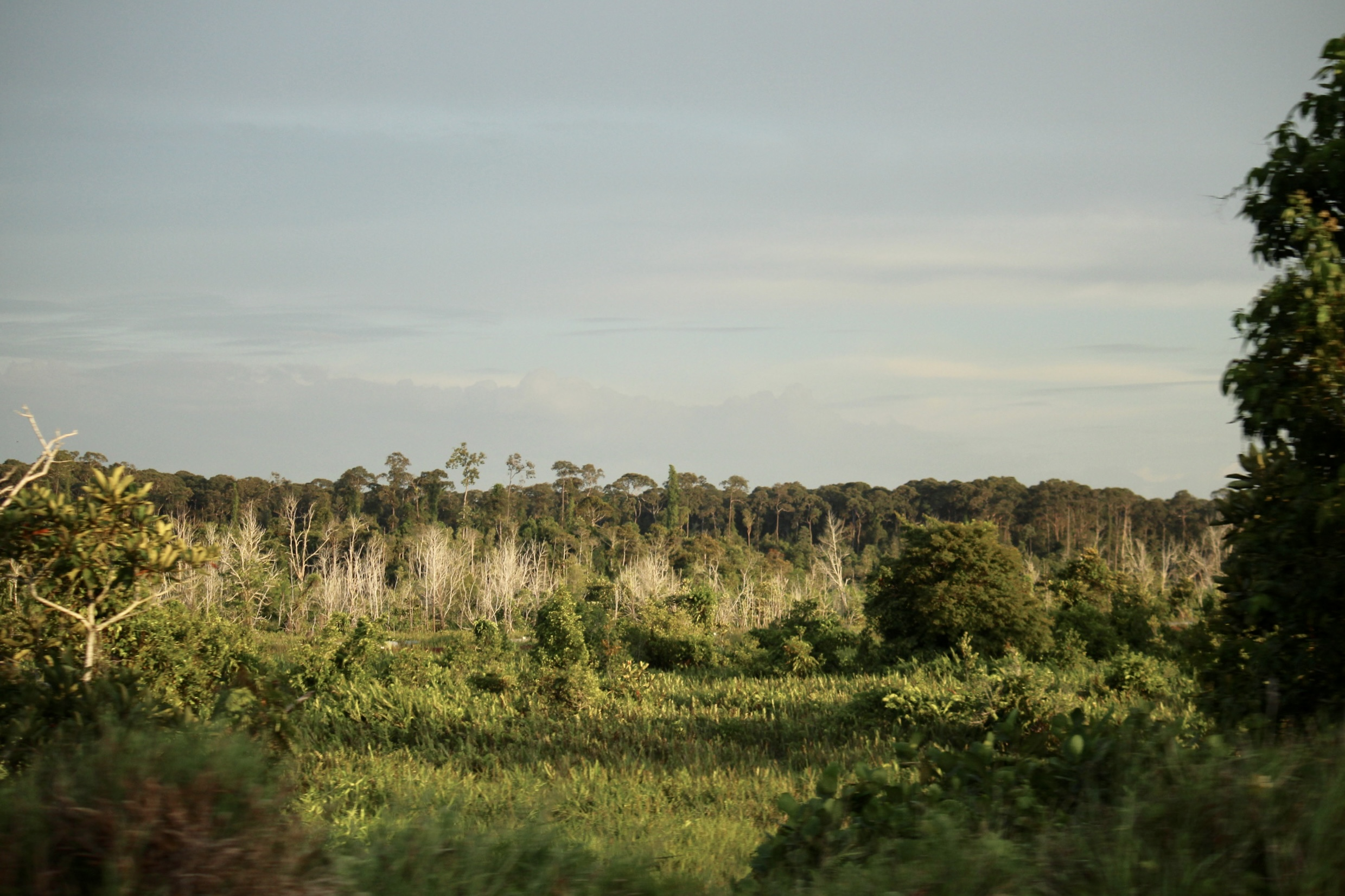
Belait Swamp Forest

=== National Forestry Policy (1989) ===
The biggest concentration of biodiversity in Brunei is found in the country's tropical rainforests. The National Forestry Policy acknowledges the concerns raised by the international community regarding the significance of preserving biological diversity and using genetic resources sustainably, as well as the role of local communities in forest management. This Policy improves cooperation and understanding in the area of forestry sector growth and management while strengthening the institutional foundation. According to the Forestry Act, there should be at least 55% of permanent forest estates strategically placed around the nation. Four main categories will be used to administer and organize the Permanent Forest Estate:

- Protection Forest for maintaining the country's favorable physical and climatic conditions, protecting water supplies, soil fertility, environmental quality, preserving biological diversity, and reducing flood and erosion damage to rivers and agricultural regions.
- Production Forest to supply all types of forest products that can be produced economically in the nation.
- Recreational Forest is preserved so that there are enough forested areas for recreation, ecotourism, and the promotion of public forestry awareness.
- Conservation Forest is preserved so that research, education, and the preservation of biological diversity can be carried out.
- National park is preserved so that ecotourism, education, and the preservation of biological diversity can be carried out.

Andulau Forest Reserve, Kuala Belalong Field Study Center, Tropical Biodiversity Center, Ulu Temburong National Park, and other designated areas for forestry education and other scientific studies are some examples of areas specifically designated for these purposes. The policy was also made to undertake and support intensive research programs in forestry and forest products aimed at enhancing maximum benefits from the forest, such as Sungai Ingei Protection Forest, Batu Apoi Forest Reserve, and Belait Swamp Forest; to develop a comprehensive program in community forestry to cater to the needs of the communities and to promote active local community involvement in forestry management projects, for example Badas Forest Reserve and Berakas Forest Reserve.

=== Wild Flora and Fauna Order (2007) ===
With the help of this Order, Brunei will be able to implement the Convention on International Trade in Endangered Species of Wild Fauna and Flora. Any species included in the Appendices to the Convention may be traded in, exported, or imported in accordance with the Order's procedures and criteria. The Director of the Forestry Department will issue the permissions. The Order also covers things like the outcomes of licenses and certificates, the authority of authorized officials to investigate, detain, search, and seize property, as well as offenses and punishments.

== History ==
One of the first institutions of the Government of Brunei's administration was the Forest Department. The establishment of a Forest Office in March 1933, with its headquarters in Kuala Belait, where the majority of the harvesting of forest produce was carried out, was necessary due to the forests' primary role in the early economic development of the nation. Later, the country's eastern region, particularly the mangrove forest and the hill forests in Temburong, saw a shift in the exploitation of lumber and other forest products. As a result, in 1954, the Department's administrative center was moved to Brunei Town, also known as Bandar Seri Begawan.

The Belait District's Sungai Liang hosted the establishment of the Forest Research Center in 1986. Following an expansion to include all department field operations, this became the Brunei Forestry Center at Sungai Liang in 1992. The Forestry Headquarters in Jalan Roberts, Bandar Seri Begawan relocated to Plaza Athirah, a private structure in Seri Commercial Complex, in the same year. Prior to the establishment of the Ministry of Industry and Primary Resources in 1989, the Forestry Department was a part of the Ministry of Development. In 1995, the Ministry's new facility at Jalan Menteri Besar in Bandar Seri Begawan was finished, and in March 1996, the Forestry Department's headquarters relocated there.

== Organisational structure ==
The structure of the department is as follows:

- Director of Forestry
  - Wood Industry
  - Financial & Administration
  - Strategic Planning & International Affairs
  - Law Enforcement
  - Deputy Director of Forestry
    - Forestry Amenities & Services
    - Management & Development of Forest
  - Senior Special Duties Officer
    - Wildlife
    - Borneo National Center

== Initiatives ==
=== Convention on Biological Diversity ===
On 27 July 2008, Brunei joined the Convention on Biological Diversity (CBD) as the 191st member. With this accession, the Convention gave the nation a global platform for conservation and strengthened ongoing efforts to conserve and develop sustainable use strategies for biological and natural resources in line with regional, national, and global standards and commitments. In accordance with Article 26 of the Convention and Decision X/10 of the Conference of Parties, Brunei's fifth national report to the CBD is presented in this document. It contains important details about Brunei's biodiversity, including national strategic actions and programs for biodiversity conservation.

=== International Forest Day ===
At the webinar themed "Forests and Sustainable Production and Consumption," among the issues discussed were those facing the timber sector, information sharing, and various best practices in forest management. In accordance with International Forest Day 2022, which was observed on 21 March 2022, the MPRT through the Forestry Department hosted a virtual webinar. In order to raise awareness, promote sustainable forest management, and instill awareness about the significance of maintaining the sustainability of all types of forest ecosystems in line with the development of other sectors in the country, it is a place where government agencies, the private sector, and non-governmental organizations (NGO) can be found.

=== National Physical Plan ===
The National Parks Program (NPP) supports the preservation of the country's biodiversity by, among other things, protecting national heritage sites. Under this program, increased resolve is shown from all sides to preserve, among other things, the natural resources and manage them sustainably, particularly for areas of natural beauty and ecological richness like pristine forests, hills, and wetlands, as well as habitats for Brunei fauna and flora. In order to achieve sustainable development, Environmentally Sensitive Areas (ESA) must also be taken into account while planning for and managing the use of natural resources. Clear development plans will be provided by the new Bandar Seri Begawan Development Master Plan to direct future development.
