= Wattled bulbul =

Wattled bulbul may refer to:

- Blue-wattled bulbul, a species of bird found in Borneo and Sumatra
- Yellow-wattled bulbul, a species of bird found in the Philippines
