= Leptomantis belalongensis =

Conservation status
- Least Concern (IUCN 3.1)

Scientific classification
- Kingdom: Animalia
- Phylum: Chordata
- Class: Amphibia
- Order: Anura
- Family: Rhacophoridae
- Genus: Leptomantis
- Species: L. belalongensis

Binomial name
- Leptomantis belalongensis Dehling & Grafe, 2008

Synonyms
- Rhacophorus belalongensis Dehling & Grafe, 2008

Species of frog

Leptomantis belalongensis is a species of frog in the family Rhacophoridae. It is endemic to Brunei and Malaysia.

== Distribution and taxonomy ==
Leptomantis belalongensis is endemic to the Temburong District of Brunei. It was initially observed in several small tributaries of the Sungai Temburong and Sungai Belalong rivers, in the area of their confluence. It was later also found in Gunung Mulu National Park in Malaysia. The frog's specific name refers to the latter river; the suffix -ensis means "originating in" in Latin. Its closest relatives include Rhacophorus bimaculatus, Rhacophorus catamitus, Rhacophorus gadingensis, and Rhacophorus gauni.

== Description ==
Leptomantis belalongensis is a small, slender frog with a narrow waist. When adult, males measure 38.2 to 30.9 millimeters, and females 34.7 to 25.8 millimeters. The head's width is greater than both its length and the width of the body. The snout is obtuse, with teeth on the upper jawbone, and the canthal ridge is sharp. The loreal region is sloping and oblique, and the nostrils are located closer to the tip of the stout than to the eyes. The irises of the large, protruding eyes are ruby-coloured, diffusing to yellow laterally with a distinct black ring along the margin. The diameter of the faintly visible tympanum equals one-third of that of the eye.

The arms are moderately slender. A characteristic row of small white tubercles can be seen on each forearm. The four fingers are slightly webbed, and their tips are oval and broad, with the disk of the third and the longest finger wider than the tympanum; each tip possesses a circummarginal groove. The legs are slender and fairly long, with the tibiotarsal joint reaching the tip of the vent. A large pointed calcar is present on each heel. The disks of the five, fairly webbed toes, of which the fourth one is the longest, are smaller than those of the fingers. Each digit possesses one to three subarticular tubercles, well developed on the fingers. Several tubercles are present on the hands and the feet, with the biggest one located at the base of the thumb. Other characteristics of the species include the lack of a dermal flap along the forearm, and a weakly expressed or absent supratympanic fold.

The skin on the back, dotted with small tubercles, as well as on the abdomen and the ventral side of the thighs is granular; it is smooth on the chin, the throat and the chest. The dorsum is light brown to grey, almost regularly speckled with small dark brown irregularly shaped spots; on the flanks and the anterior surfaces of the thighs can be seen irregularly shaped sky blue blotches. The venter is white.

== Ecology and behaviour ==
Leptomantis belalongensis can be found on vegetation, next to small, fast-flowing rivulets, usually at one to three meters above the ground; some males, however, were heard calling from as high as ten meters.

The advertisement calls consist of one to three, usually two, short clicks, given at irregular intervals. The eggs are deposited within foam nests, as big as 38.4 mm x 26.9 mm x 9.1 mm and attached to the surface of leaves. The number of eggs laid is small—up to 25, with most of them typically hatching into tadpoles.

This frog is classified as at least concern of extinction because, even though its range is small, it is entirely within two national parks, Ulu Temburong National Park and Gunung Mulu National Park.
