= Wildlife of Brunei =

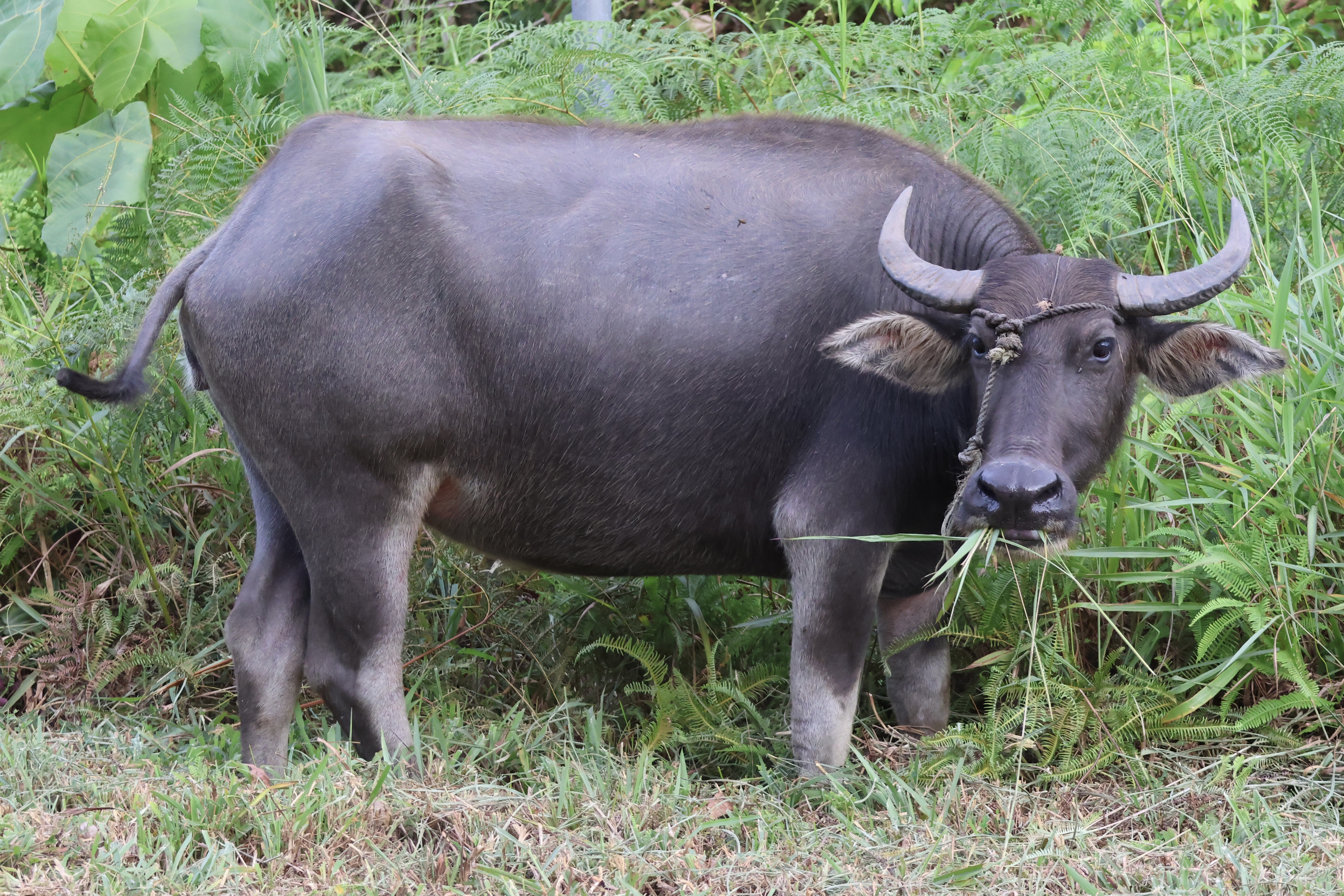
A carabao grazing in Bukit Sawat

The wildlife of Brunei is one of its primary attractions. Tropical evergreen rainforest makes up the majority of the country's natural vegetation. 81% of the land is covered by forests, with 59% being primary forests and 22% being secondary forests and plantations. With an estimated 2,000 species of trees, Brunei is home to an estimated 15,000 species of vascular plants. Brunei's mammal and bird populations are comparable to those of Sumatra, the Malaysian Peninsula, and Borneo as a whole.

As far as Asian countries go, Brunei was the first to ban shark finning. Dog beating and wildlife trafficking are Brunei's two most urgent animal law concerns. Like many other Asian nations, the nation has some animal-related legislation, but enforcement is lax.

== Terrestrial fauna ==
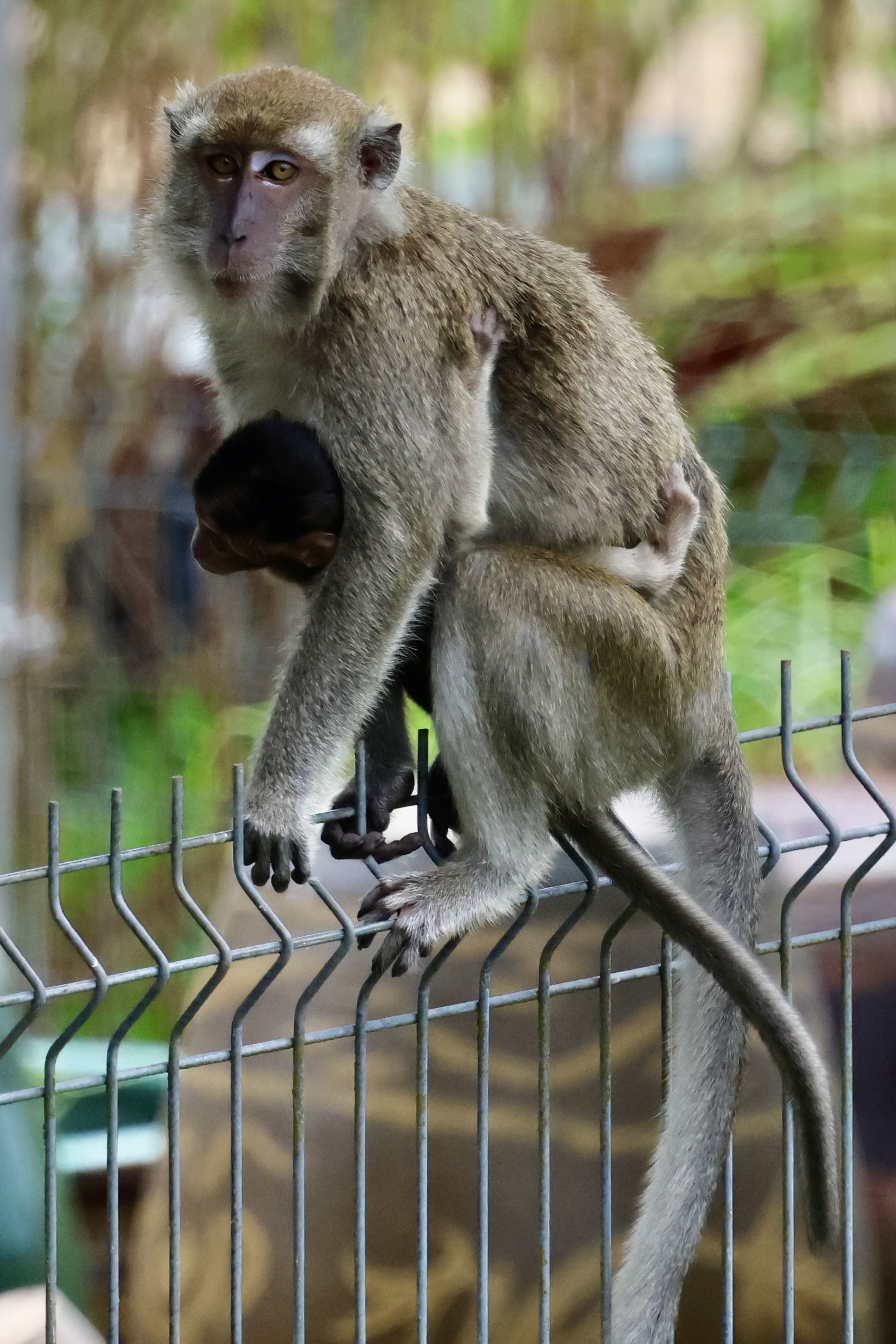
Crab-eating macaque

A wide variety of wildlife can be found in Brunei's forests, including 500 species of marine fish and invertebrates, 622 species of birds, 121 species of mammals, 182 species of amphibians and reptiles, and some native species like the Nycticebus borneanus, Bronchocela cristatella, Bornean sun bear, and Pelobatrachus nasutus. Proboscis monkeys and ground squirrels are endemic to Brunei. The nation is home to two species of crocodiles: the false gharial and the estuary crocodile. The varied range of freshwater crocodiles are found in Brunei's small torrential streams, estuaries with highly acidic environments, and alkaline waters.

=== Mammals ===
In Brunei, several mammal species, including the Asian elephant, banteng, long-footed treeshrew, orangutan, and otter civet, are classified as critically endangered or endangered, while the bay cat, clouded leopard, dugong, flat-headed cat, smooth-coated otter, marbled cat, pig-tailed macaque, and proboscis monkey are listed as vulnerable, according to the 2004 IUCN Red List of Threatened Species.

=== Birds ===
The rainforest of Brunei is a habitat to numerous hornbills, barbets, sunbirds, spiderhunters, leafbirds, trogons, and floor-dwelling species including pheasants, pittas, and wren-babblers. The riverine and coastal habitats, which comprise freshwater marshes and mangroves are significant locations. Birds are numerous on the hillsides of Brunei, which border the Malaysian state of Sarawak. But accessing some of these regions can be difficult, particularly during the monsoon season.

== Terrestrial flora ==
One of the oldest rainforests in the world, Temburong is home to rainforests that date back more than 150 million years. Many plant and animal species, some of which are unique to Brunei and Borneo, can be found in abundance in the woodlands. Of the country's total land area, 72% is covered by forest, and 41% is legally protected. Over 70% of Brunei is made up of lush, verdant jungles that have been kept out of human grasp.

The greatest remaining intact mangroves in northern Borneo are found in the coastal mangroves. In Brunei Bay, they make up one of the biggest areas of comparatively untouched mangroves in eastern Asia, along with those in nearby nations. Although less so than in other nations in the region, mangroves are used for a variety of purposes. With more than 50% live coral cover, the 45 square kilometres (17 sq mi) coral reef along the coast is most famous for the rare co-occurrence of a very distinctive suite of hard and soft corals and gorgonian sea fans.

Brunei boasts 400 species of reef-building coral, with the majority of its peat swamp forests situated along the Belait River basin in the west and seasonally flooded areas in the middle reaches of the Tutong River, all maintaining nearly perfect conditions. The limited exploitation of these forests is attributed to the population residing along the shore and the predominant role of hydrocarbon fossil fuels in the nation's development and economy; clear-cutting is prohibited, and timber exportation is not allowed, while the Forestry Department strictly regulates wood harvest for domestic use.

== Conservation ==
=== Environmental issues ===
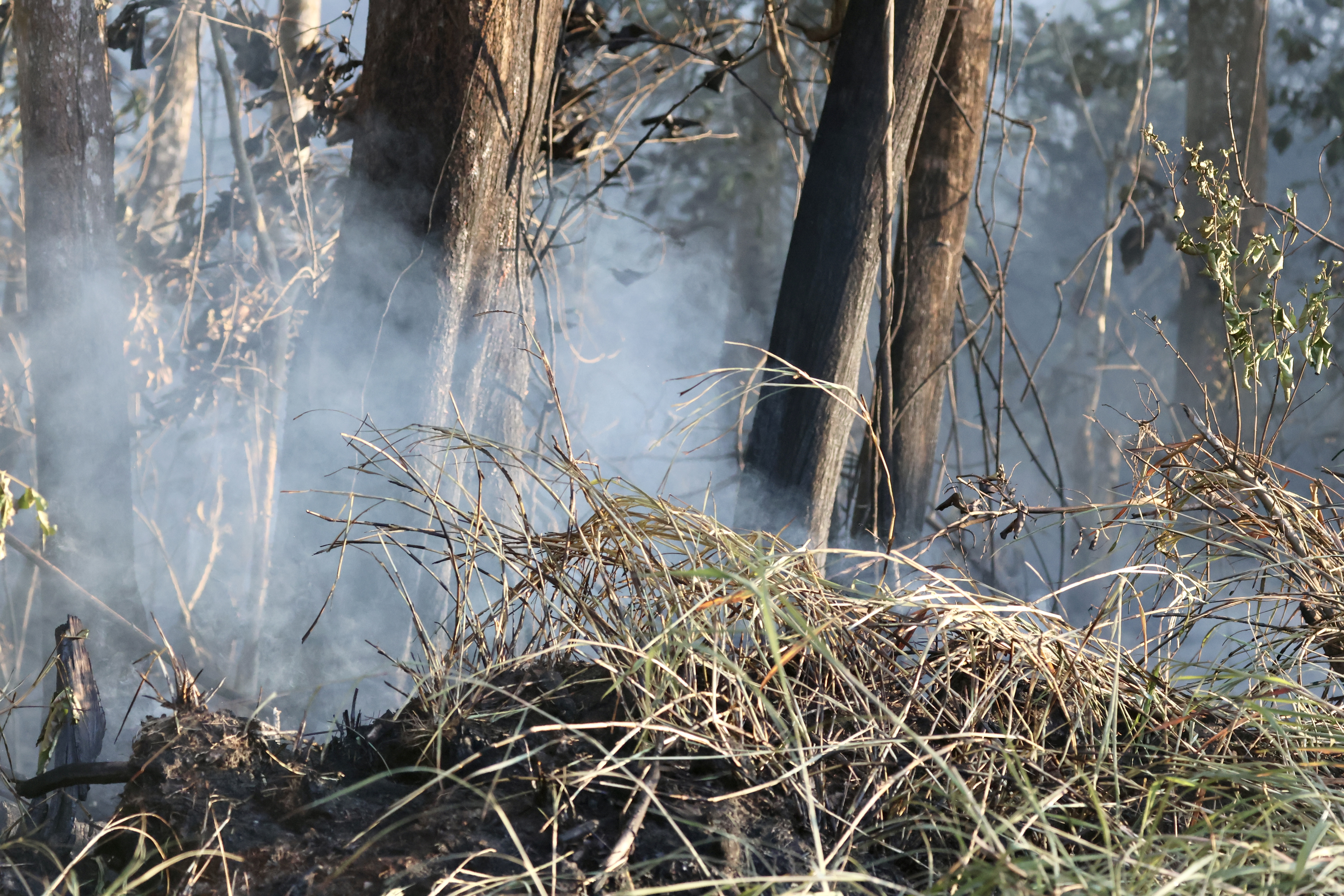
A wildfire in Lumut, 2023

Ecosystem threats in the country includes land development, pollution, encroachment, climate change and invasive species. Meanwhile threats to the species includes poaching, collection and invasive alien species. These risks are fuelled by a number of factors, including economic expansion, the desire for products and services, the demand for exotic meat, traditional and herbal medicines, wild ornamental plants, and tourism in pristine places. These have resulted in the loss of species, habitat, ecosystem fragmentation, inland water pollution, and ecological benefits. There are also new dangers to biodiversity, such climate change. Numerous species are obtained to provide the global demand for meat, pets, luxury goods, medicines, and zoos.

=== Countermeasures ===
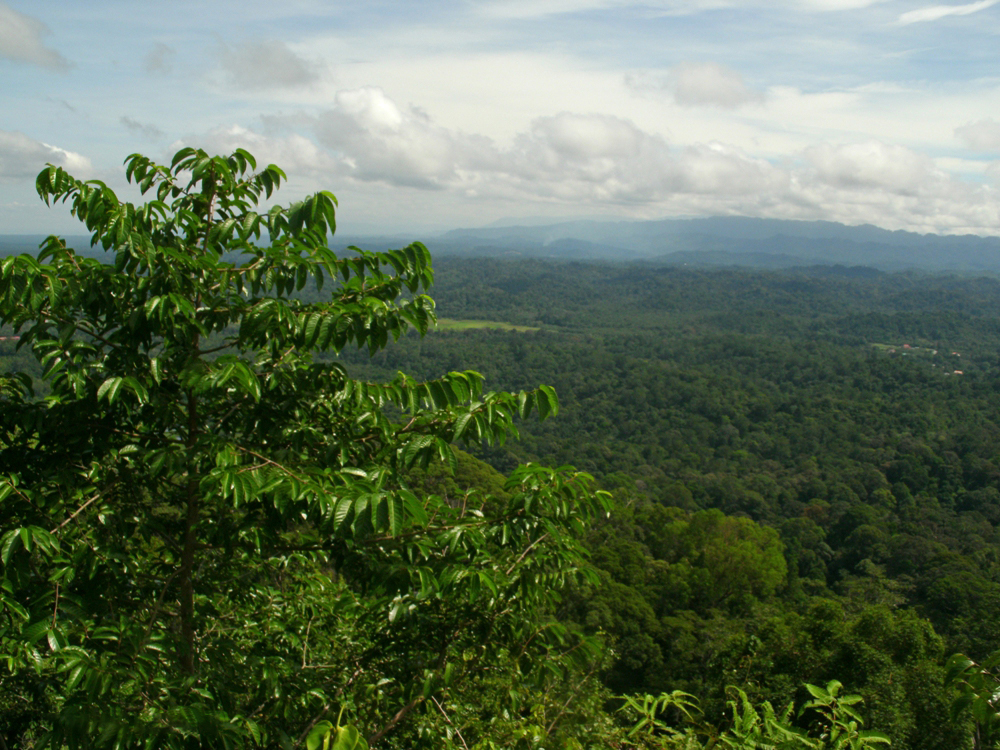
Peradayan Forest Reserve

Forest reserves comprise all designated protected areas. The principal habitat categories are generally well-represented within the protected areas system, with the exception of swamp forest habitats. As of right now, Brunei's forest reserves are managed using sustainable management techniques in accordance with the ideas for forest development and conservation presented in the Strategic Plan for Forestry. Organisations (such as government ministries, NGOs, and higher education institutions) have undertaken initiatives to advance collaboration and exchange programs for biodiversity education and awareness raising. These initiatives include the organisation of seminars and conferences aimed at exchanging knowledge and expertise on biodiversity research and management, among other topics.

Field gene banks and arboretums are repositories of agricultural biodiversity and rice varieties. As part of the gene banks' efforts, the community was also given free seedlings of native fruit species. The Brunei National Herbarium has the only specimens of the country's flora. As part of its yearly conservation program, the Forestry Department of the government of Brunei plants trees. In only one year, the government pledged to plant 60,000 trees around the nation. Projects like this one that restore biodiversity are allotted land, and as part of the project, free seedlings were distributed to the local population.

==== BruWILD ====
An NGO called Brunei Biodiversity & Natural History Society (BruWILD) is dedicated to preserving biodiversity by action and education. Through its rescue operations and educational initiatives, BruWILD significantly contributed to the preservation of Brunei's wildlife and increased public understanding of the value of environmental sustainability. To commemorate World Environment Day in June 2017, the High Commission for Canada collaborated with BruWILD and the Collective.

To provide training for wildlife rescue and rehabilitation in Brunei, the International Wildlife Rehabilitation Council (IWRC) and BruWILD have partnered. 30 participants, including members of BruWILD, the Wildlife Division (Ministry of Primary Resources and Tourism), Universiti Brunei Darussalam (UBD), and International School Brunei (ISB), will be taught courses by IWRC instructors during their 25–30 July 2016 trip to Brunei. The courses would be held in the Faculty of Science laboratories at UBD.

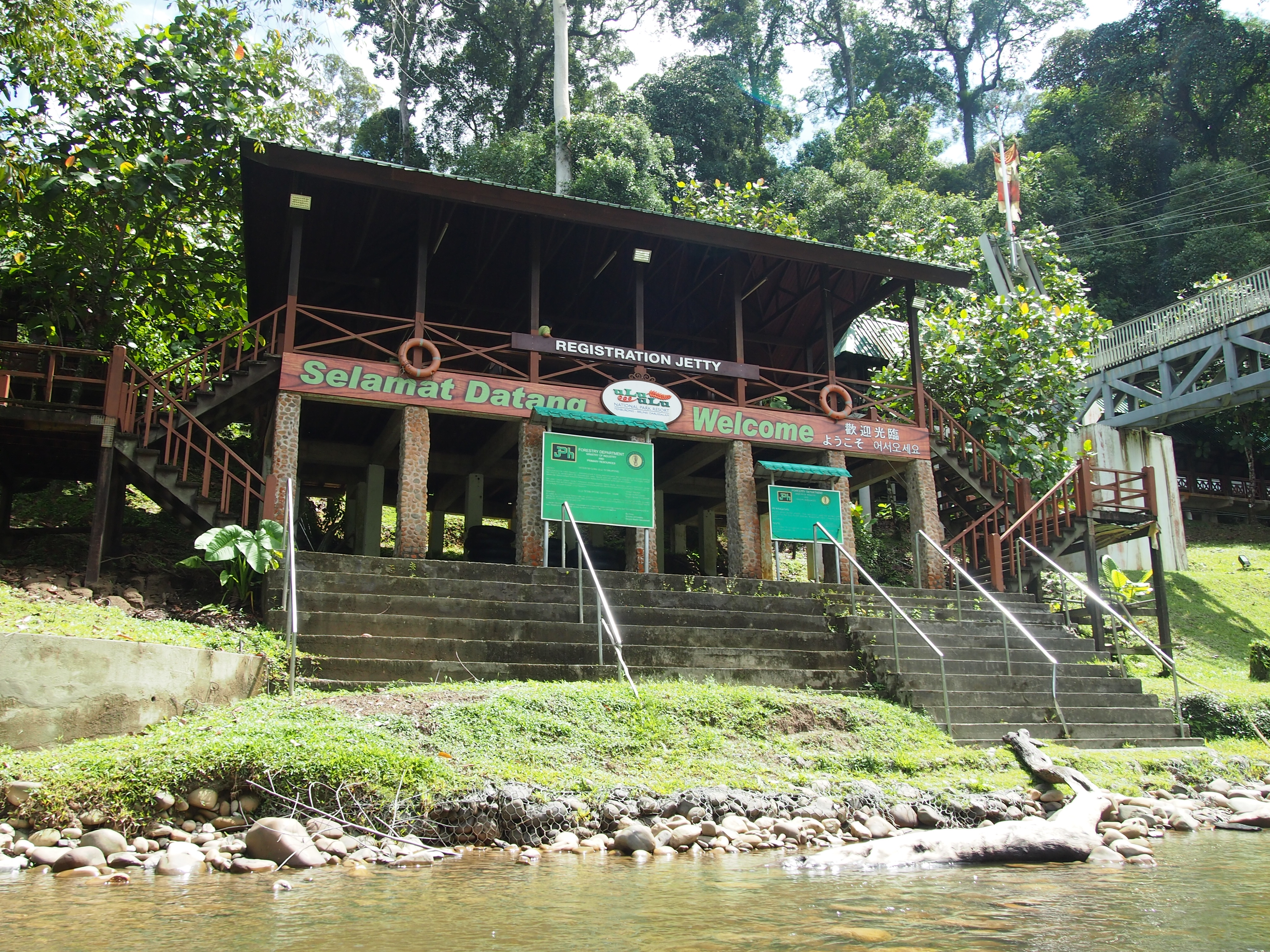
Ulu Temburong National Park

==== Temburong ====
Temburong is renowned for its varied animals, waterfalls, and primary forests. One of Southeast Asia's best-preserved rainforests, Ulu Temburong National Park, is located in this area, alongside a cavern network in the Batu Apoi Forest Reserve.

The China State Construction Engineering Corporation (CSCEC) completed the Sultan Haji Omar Ali Saifuddien Bridge (Temburong Bridge) project inside the rural Temburong District that is primarily unoccupied and covered in virgin forest. Situated in the centre of the district, the easternmost region of Brunei, which is home to endemic fauna and indigenous vegetation, the company had to move forward with the megaproject while taking care to ensure that the natural landscape was damaged as little as possible. Additionally, workers have been told to record any wildlife encounters they may come across. Furthermore, eco-friendly practices are promoted, and trainings and inspections were carried out to guarantee that the flora and fauna are not affected.

==== Policies ====
The Wild Fauna and Flora Order 2007 provides for the implementation of the International Trade in Endangered Species of Wild Fauna and Flora Convention in Brunei, as well as procedures and requirements for obtaining permits and certificates to trade in, export, or import any species listed in the convention's appendices. Wild Life Protection 1984 provides for the protection of wildlife by limiting hunting seasons, animal age ranges, and hunting tactics, as well as establishing wildlife sanctuaries even within protected or reserved forests. The game officer shall have responsibility over and supervise compliance with the current act.

== See also ==
- List of parks in Brunei Darussalam
- Tourism in Brunei
