= Leptomantis fasciatus =

Conservation status
- Least Concern (IUCN 3.1)

Scientific classification
- Kingdom: Animalia
- Phylum: Chordata
- Class: Amphibia
- Order: Anura
- Family: Rhacophoridae
- Genus: Leptomantis
- Species: L. fasciatus

Binomial name
- Leptomantis fasciatus (Boulenger, 1895)

Synonyms
- Rhacophorus fasciatus Boulenger, 1895

Species of frog

Leptomantis fasciatus is a species of frog in the family Rhacophoridae found in Malaysia, Indonesia, and Brunei. It has been observed as high as 200 metres (660 ft) above sea level.

This frog is found in peat swamps in rainforests. Scientists do not believe it can tolerate disturbed habitats. It breeds through larval development.

Scientists classify this frog as least concern of extinction because of its large range, which includes three protected parks: Gunung Mulu National Park, Kayan Mentarang National Park, and Ulu Temburong National Park.
