= Leptomantis malkmusi =

Conservation status
- Least Concern (IUCN 3.1)

Scientific classification
- Kingdom: Animalia
- Phylum: Chordata
- Class: Amphibia
- Order: Anura
- Family: Rhacophoridae
- Genus: Leptomantis
- Species: L. malkmusi

Binomial name
- Leptomantis malkmusi (Dehling, 2015)

Synonyms
- Rhacophorus malkmusi Dehling, 2015

Species of frog

Leptomantis malkmusi is a species of frog in the family Rhacophoridae. It is endemic to Malaysia, where it has been observed between 500 and 1000 meters above sea level.

The adult male frog measures 26.4–29.3 mm in snout-vent length and the adult female frog 32.3–35.4 mm. This frog can change color. The skin of the dorsum is ochre during the day and light brown at night. There are small, dark spots, and large brown blotches on the back. There is a dark brown intraorbital mark. There are white spots on the sides of the head with a dark brown line around each one and one white spot underneath each tympanum. There are bars on the tops of all four legs. These stripes are gray during the day and dark brown at night. There are white tubercules on the legs. There is bright yellow color on parts of the sides, legs, and feet. The toes, belly, and throat are white in color. The webbed skin on all four feet is gray in color. The iris of the eye is ruby in the middle and yellow on the outside, with a black ring outermost.

This frog lives in hilly rainforests, primary and recovering. It has been found in the vegetation next to streams. During the breeding season, the male frog climbs to a leaf over the water, where the female frog lays her eggs in a foam nest.

Scientists believe this frog is not in danger of dying out because even though its range is small that range includes two well-protected parks. Scientists think climate change could pose a threat to this frog.

Scientists had considered these individuals conspecific with Leptomantis gauni but revised this view in 2015.
