= Leptomantis bimaculatus =

Conservation status
- Least Concern (IUCN 3.1)

Scientific classification
- Kingdom: Animalia
- Phylum: Chordata
- Class: Amphibia
- Order: Anura
- Family: Rhacophoridae
- Genus: Leptomantis
- Species: L. bimaculatus

Binomial name
- Leptomantis bimaculatus Peters, 1867

Synonyms
- Rhacophorus bimaculatus (Peters, 1867); Philautus zamboangensis Taylor, 1922

Species of frog

Leptomantis bimaculatus is a species of frog in the moss frog family (Rhacophoridae). Described by Wilhelm Peters in 1867, it is endemic to the Philippines. There, it is known to occur on the islands of Bohol, Mindanao, and in the south of Luzon; it might also be found on other islands as its known range brackets the main chain of the Philippines archipelago.

This arboreal frog has been observed near water in undisturbed forests between 500 and 600 meters above sea level.

== Taxonomy ==
This species was initially placed in the genus Leptomantis, as L. bimaculata. It was erroneously described a second time in 1922, under the junior synonym Philautus zamboangensis. Leptomantis was later merged into Rhacophorus, and its name became the senior homonym of the R. bimaculatus named so by G. A. Boulenger in 1882; that species was subsequently renamed to R. bipunctatus. Now, the genus Leptomantis has been removed from synonymy with Rhacophorus and is recognised as a separate genus again. For some time, it was believed that similar frogs from Indonesia and Malaysia also belonged to the present species. But this was found to be wrong, and the western relative is now known as R. cyanopunctatus. Tadpoles from Borneo were also discussed under the name R. bimaculatus; these actually were of R. cyanopunctatus or R. gauni.
