= Leptomantis penanorum =

Conservation status
- Least Concern (IUCN 3.1)

Scientific classification
- Kingdom: Animalia
- Phylum: Chordata
- Class: Amphibia
- Order: Anura
- Family: Rhacophoridae
- Genus: Leptomantis
- Species: L. penanorum

Binomial name
- Leptomantis penanorum (Dehling, 2008)

Synonyms
- Rhacophorus penanorum Dehling, 2008

Species of amphibians

Leptomantis penanorum, commonly known as the Penan flying frog, is a species of frog in the family Rhacophoridae. It is endemic to Gunung Mulu National Park in Malaysia. It has been observed at a single site 1,650 m (5,410 ft) above sea level.

The skin of the dorsum is yellow-green in color. The iris is ruby-colored with some gray.

This frog has been observed in one stream high in the headwaters of Sungei Tapin. Scientists believe it is unlikely to live elsewhere because there are few other similar habitats nearby. The tadpoles swim in small pools with moderate current.

Scientists classify this frog as least concern of extinction because, despite its small range, it lives in a park with effective measures to manage the frogs existence.
