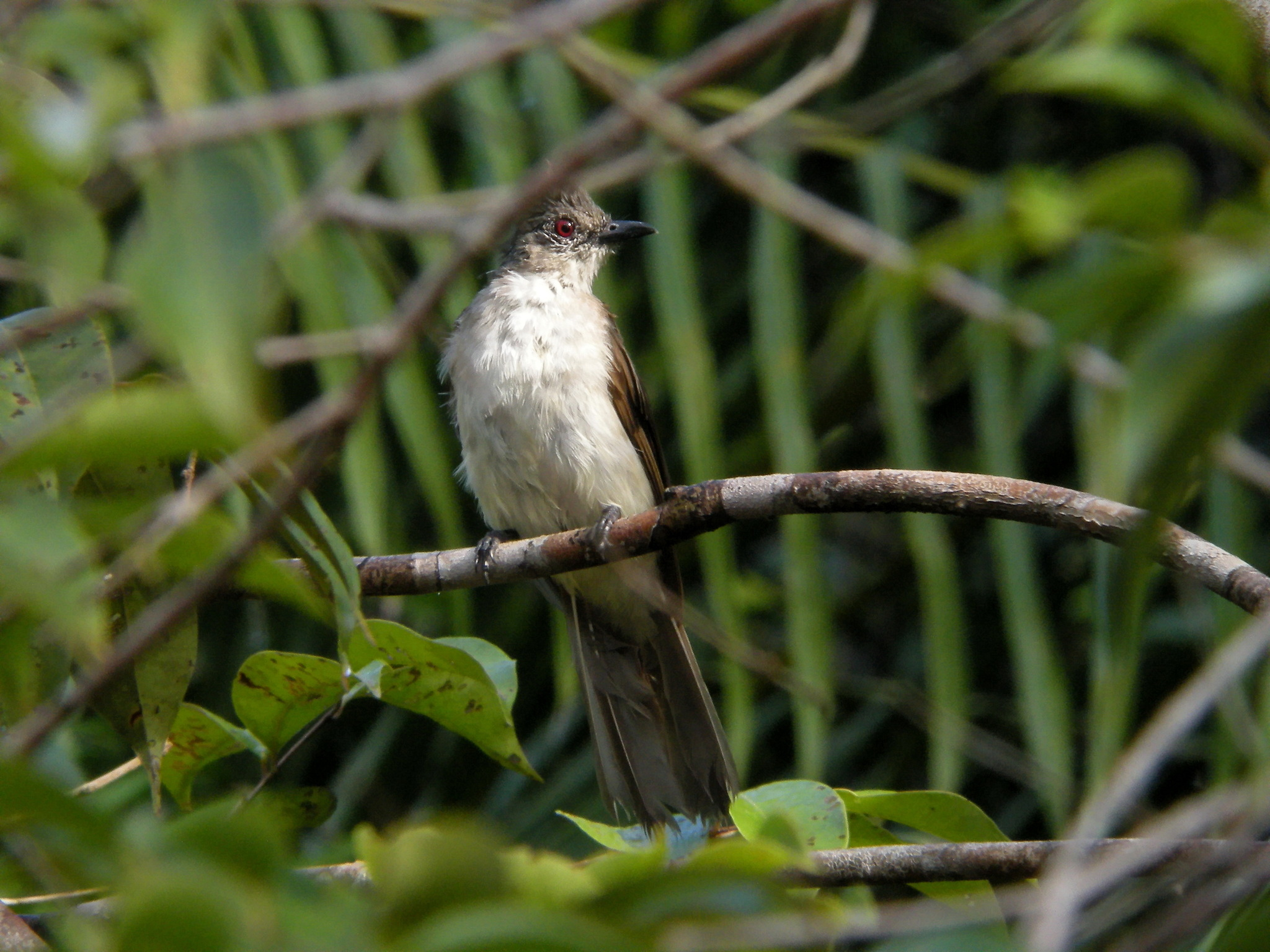

Conservation status
- Near Threatened (IUCN 3.1)

Scientific classification
- Kingdom: Animalia
- Phylum: Chordata
- Class: Aves
- Order: Passeriformes
- Family: Pycnonotidae
- Genus: Microtarsus
- Species: M. eutilotus

Binomial name
- Microtarsus eutilotus (Jardine & Selby, 1837)
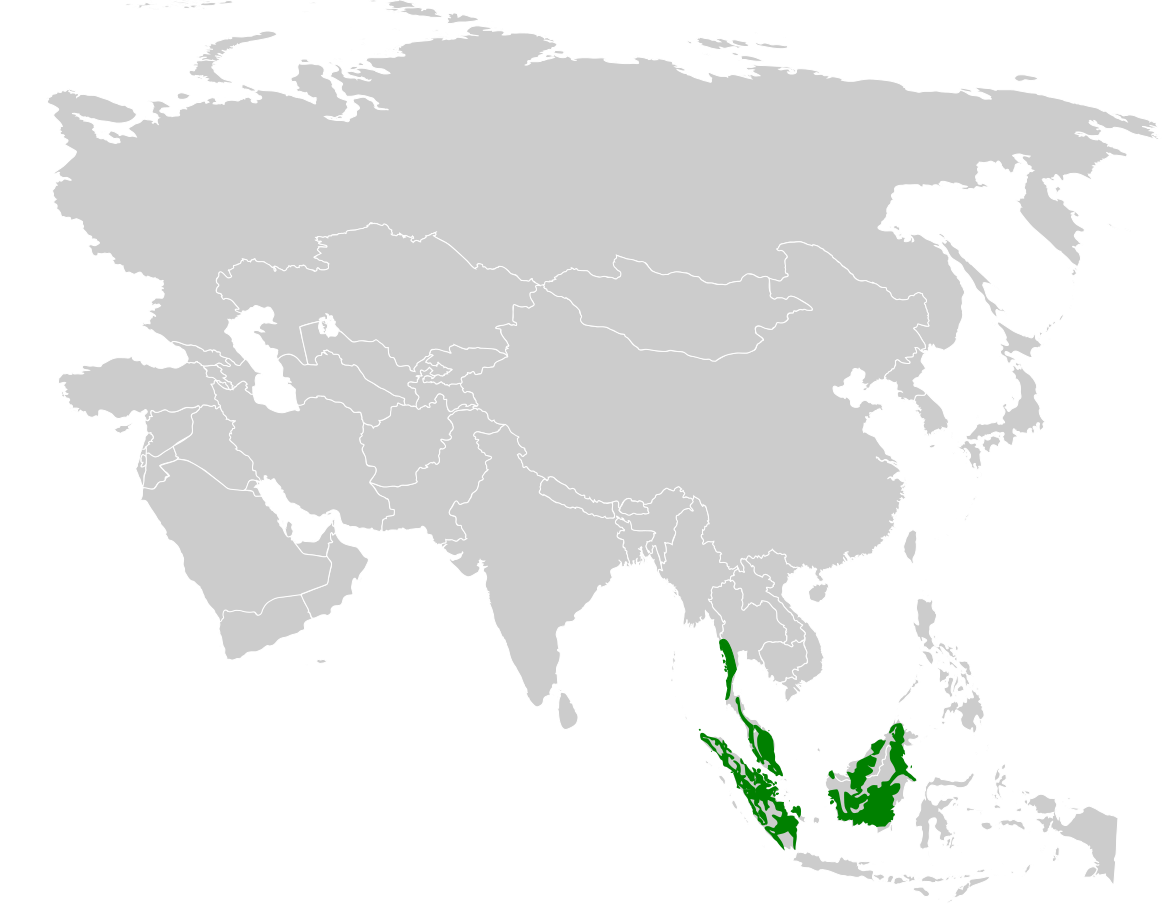

Synonyms
- Brachypus eutilotus; Pycnonotus eutilotus; Brachypodius eutilotus; Euptilotus eutilotus

= Puff-backed bulbul =

Species of songbird

The puff-backed bulbul (Microtarsus eutilotus) is a species of songbird in the family Pycnonotidae. It is found on the Malay Peninsula, Sumatra and Borneo. Alternate names for the puff-backed bulbul include the crested brown bulbul and puff-backed brown bulbul. Its natural habitat is subtropical or tropical moist lowland forests. It is threatened by habitat loss.
