= Leptomantis gadingensis =

Scientific classification
- Kingdom: Animalia
- Phylum: Chordata
- Class: Amphibia
- Order: Anura
- Family: Rhacophoridae
- Genus: Leptomantis
- Species: L. gadingensis

Binomial name
- Leptomantis gadingensis (Das and Haas, 2005)

Synonyms
- Rhacophorus gadingensis Das and Haas, 2005; Leptomantis fasciatus Jiang, Jiang, Ren, Wu, and Li, 2019

Species of frog

Leptomantis gadingensis, the Gunung Gading tree frog or Gading tree frog, is a species of frog in the family Rhacophoridae. It is endemic to Malaysia, where it has been observed between 0 and 150 meters above sea level.

The adult frog measures 29.5 mm long in snout-vent length. The skin of the dorsum is brown in color with a dark intraorbital bar, dark blotches on the back, and some blue pigmentation on the flanks.

This frog has been observed near undisturbed streams with fast-moving water. The male frog its 3 m above the ground and calls to the female frogs.

Scientists classify this frog as not in danger of extinction because, despite its small range, that range consists of two protected parks.
