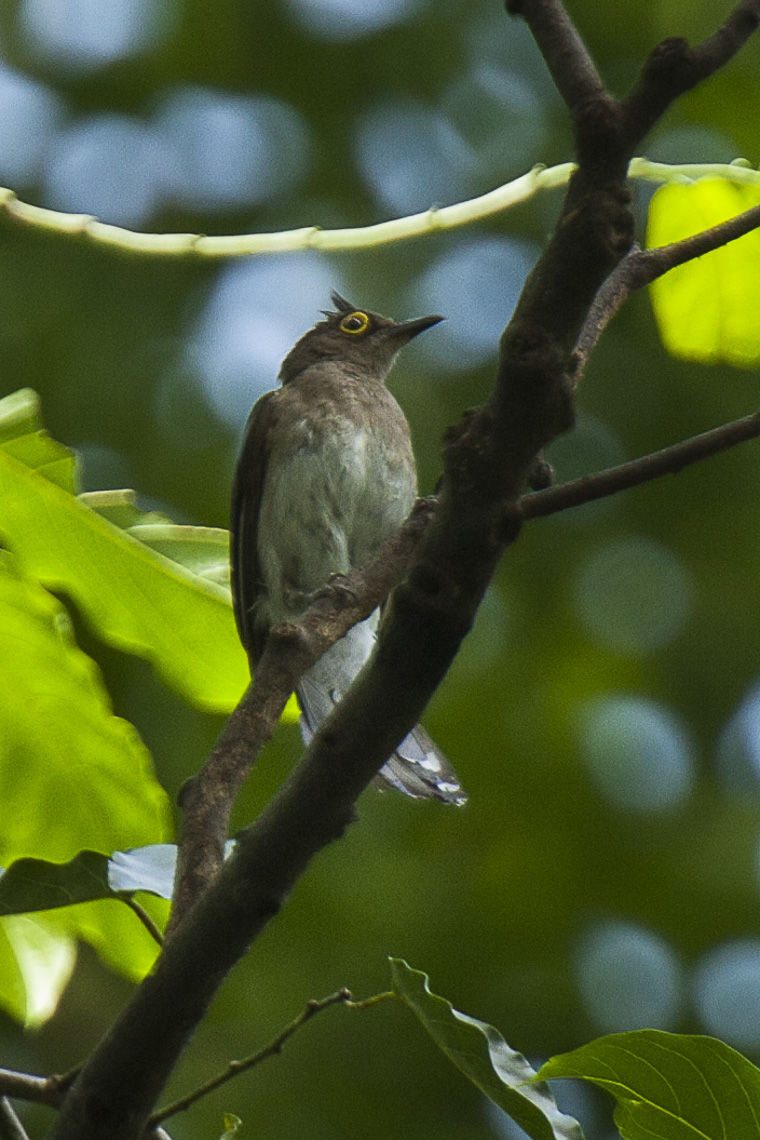

Conservation status
- Least Concern (IUCN 3.1)

Scientific classification
- Kingdom: Animalia
- Phylum: Chordata
- Class: Aves
- Order: Passeriformes
- Family: Pycnonotidae
- Genus: Microtarsus
- Species: M. urostictus

Binomial name
- Microtarsus urostictus (Salvadori, 1870)
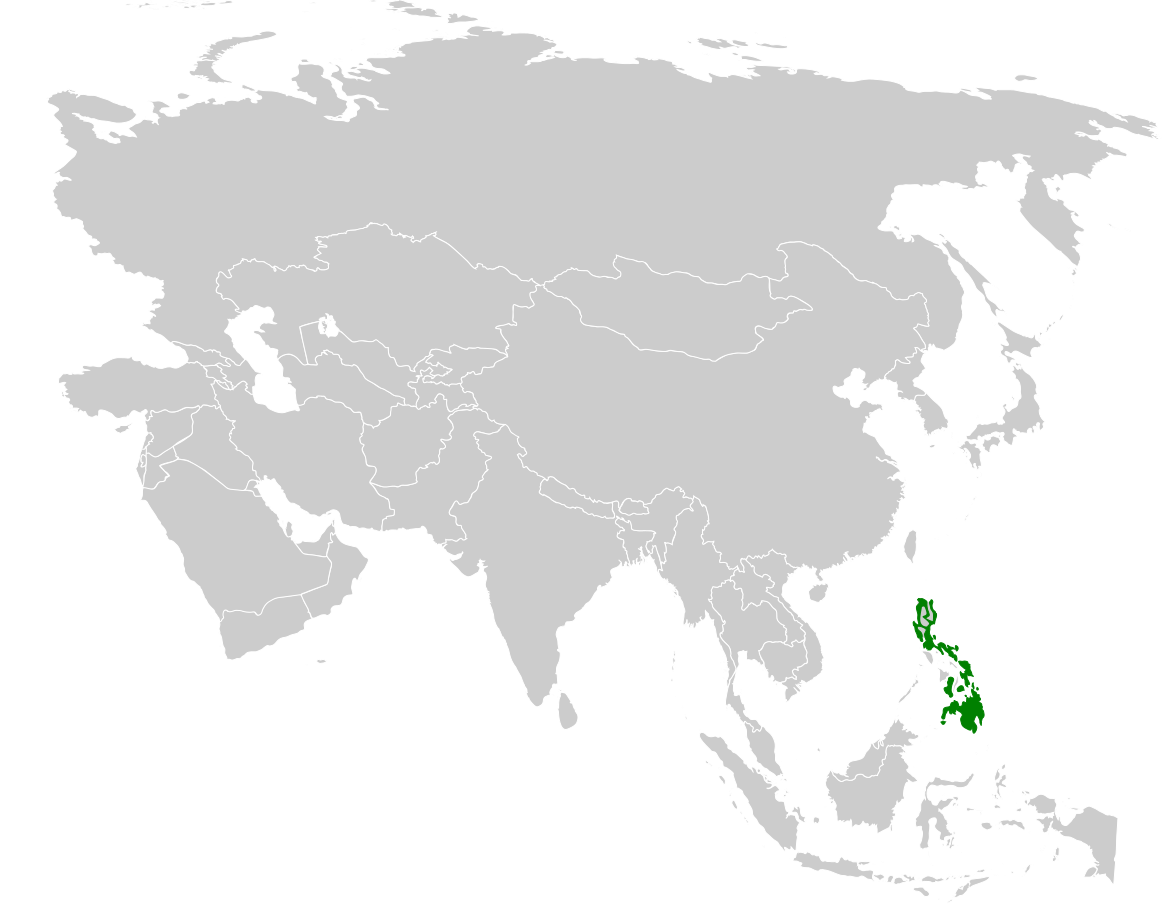

Synonyms
- Brachypus urostictus; Pycnonotus urostictus; Brachypodius urostictus; Poliolophus urostictus

= Yellow-wattled bulbul =

Species of bird

The yellow-wattled bulbul (Microtarsus urostictus) is a species of songbird in the bulbul family of passerine birds. It is endemic to the Philippines. Its natural habitat is tropical moist lowland forests and forest edge

== Description and taxonomy ==
The yellow-wattled bulbul was described by Tommaso Salvadori in 1870. In common with the blue-wattled bulbul, it is alternately referred to as simply the wattled bulbul.

=== Subspecies ===
Five subspecies are recognized:

- M. u. urostictus - (Salvadori, 1870): Found on central and southern Luzon, Catanduanes and Polillo Island
- M. u. ilokensis - (Rand & Rabor, 1967): Found on northern Luzon; darker underparts with a larger bill
- M. u. atricaudatus - (Parkes, 1967): Found on Samar, Biliran, Leyte, Bohol Negros and Panaon Island; darker tail featjhers but also with more extensive white tail tips
- M. u. philippensis - (Hachisuka, 1934): Found on Dinagat, Siargao, Bucas Grande and Mindanao (except the Zamboanga Peninsula); paler underparts with more extensive white tail tips
- M. u. basilanicus - (Steere, 1890): Originally described as a separate species. Found on the Zamboanga Peninsula (western Mindanao) and Basilan; has a more olive back and more extensive white on the breast

== Distribution and habitat ==
Its natural habitats at tropical moist lowland secondary forest and forest edge up to 1,000 meters above sea level, it tends to avoid more intact primary forest

== Behaviour and ecology ==
Not much is known about this species but it is often observed feeding on fruit. It is seen alone, in pairs and small families. Recorded breeding from March to August. The nest is described as cup-shaped with a typical clutch size of 3 eggs.

== Conservation status ==
The IUCN Red List has assessed this bird as least-concern species as it has a wide range and seems to be able to persist and even thrive in degraded habitats.
