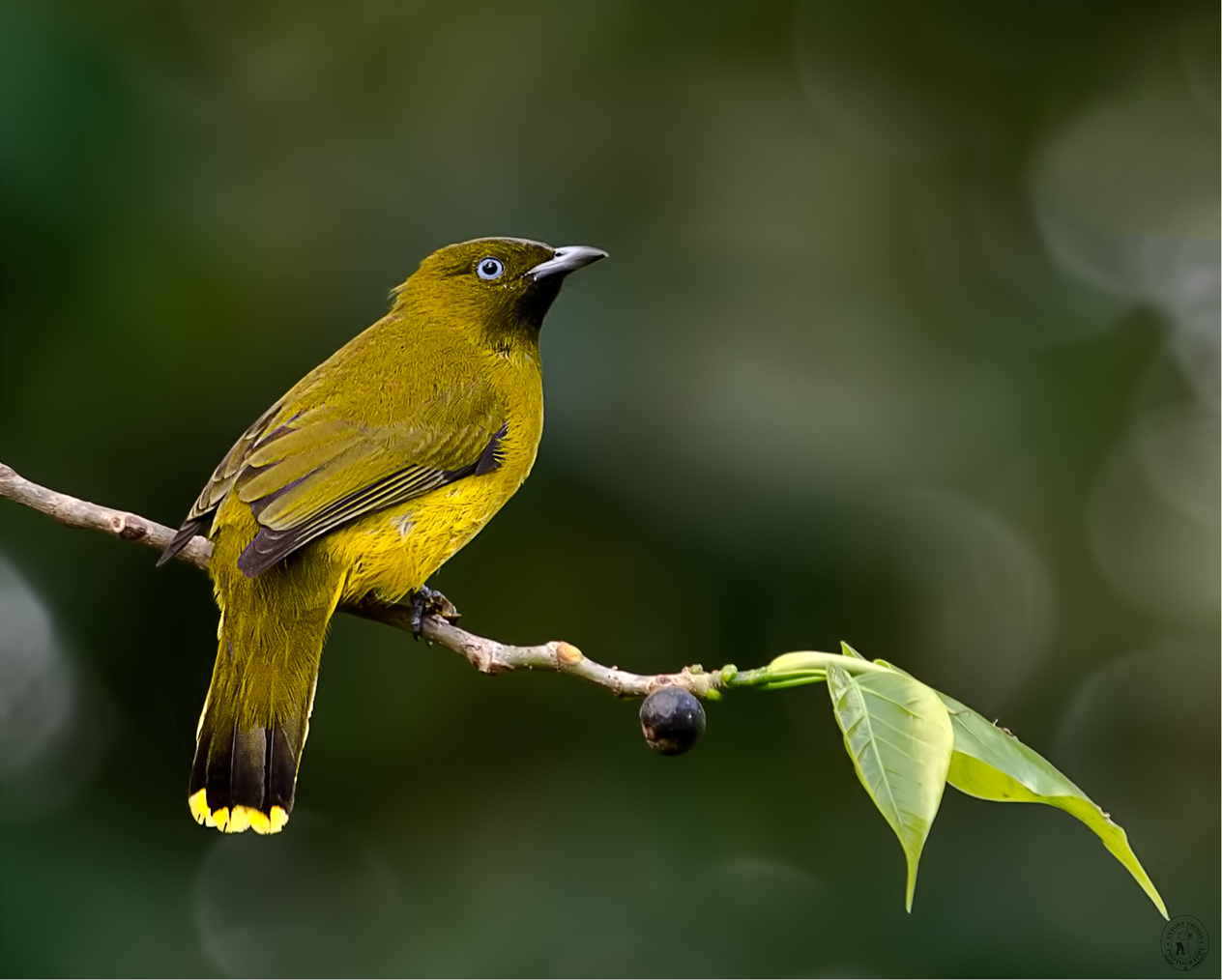

Conservation status
- Least Concern (IUCN 3.1)

Scientific classification
- Kingdom: Animalia
- Phylum: Chordata
- Class: Aves
- Order: Passeriformes
- Family: Pycnonotidae
- Genus: Microtarsus
- Species: M. fuscoflavescens

Binomial name
- Microtarsus fuscoflavescens (Hume, 1873)

Synonyms
- Pycnonotus fuscoflavescens; Pycnonotus atriceps fuscoflavescens; Brachypodius fuscoflavescens

= Andaman bulbul =

Species of bird

The Andaman bulbul (Microtarsus fuscoflavescens) is a member of the bulbul family of passerine birds. It is endemic to the Andaman Islands. It has a mainly olive-yellow plumage and has most of the head olive. It feeds on small fruit and berries, but will also take insects.

Until 2008, the Andaman bulbul was considered as a subspecies of the black-headed bulbul.
