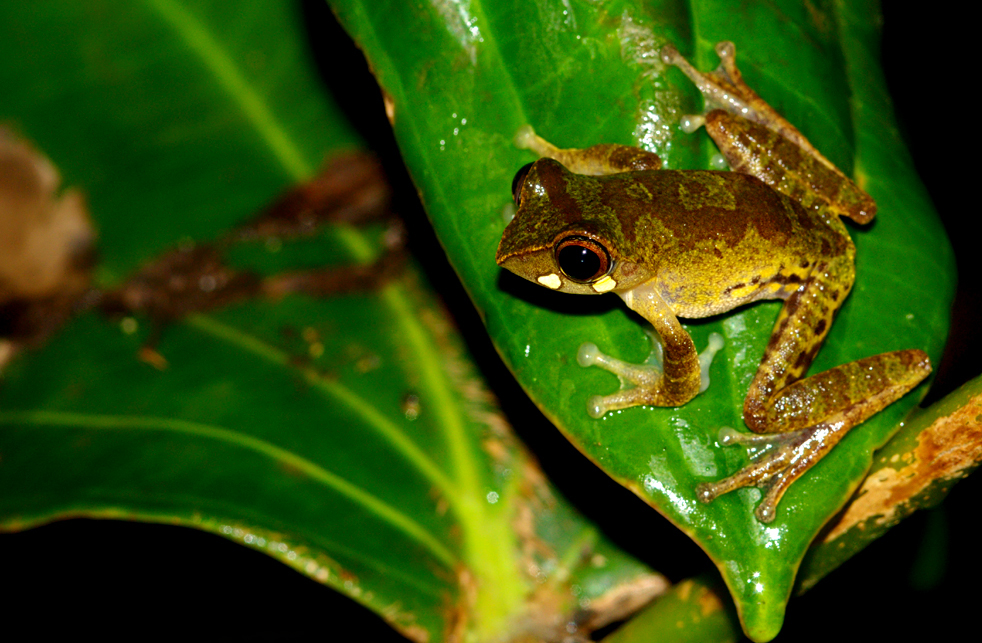

Conservation status
- Near Threatened (IUCN 3.1)

Scientific classification
- Kingdom: Animalia
- Phylum: Chordata
- Class: Amphibia
- Order: Anura
- Family: Rhacophoridae
- Genus: Leptomantis
- Species: L. angulirostris

Binomial name
- Leptomantis angulirostris (Ahl, 1927)

Synonyms
- Rhacophorus angulirostris Ahl, 1927

= Leptomantis angulirostris =

Species of amphibian

Leptomantis angulirostris, commonly known as the masked tree frog, is a member of the tree frog family Rhacophoridae and is found in Indonesia and Malaysian Borneo. Its natural habitats are subtropical or tropical moist lowland forests, subtropical or tropical moist montane forests, and rivers. It is threatened by habitat loss.

== Description ==
A relatively small frog, males range in length from 31–33 mm and females from 45–51 mm. The head is wider than long. Snout pointed with sharp canthus rostralis. Dilated finger and toe tips are characteristic. Webbing in feet almost complete, touching the toe pad on all digits except fourth. Webbing in hand partial with webbing reaching the second sub-articular tubercle on finger three. Skin smooth on dorsum, granulated on chest and venter. Variable in skin coloration but broadly ranges from pale grey-green to brown. Dark crossbars are common on dorsum near the vent and on legs. Sides of the body and inner surface of the legs are yellow with black blotches. Often, few fawn colored blotches are found on snout. Iris brown, often with a tinge of blue.

== Distribution, natural history and ecology ==
This species is thought be found in Sumatra and Malaysian Borneo. However, the record from Sumatra warrants scrutiny. It is commonly found in the Crocker Range and Mt. Kinabalu National Park.

It is found in primary rainforests along rocky streams above 1000 m above sea level. Males vocalize perched on small saplings and trees overhanging streams. Tadpoles are known to live in shallow areas of stream underneath gravel.
