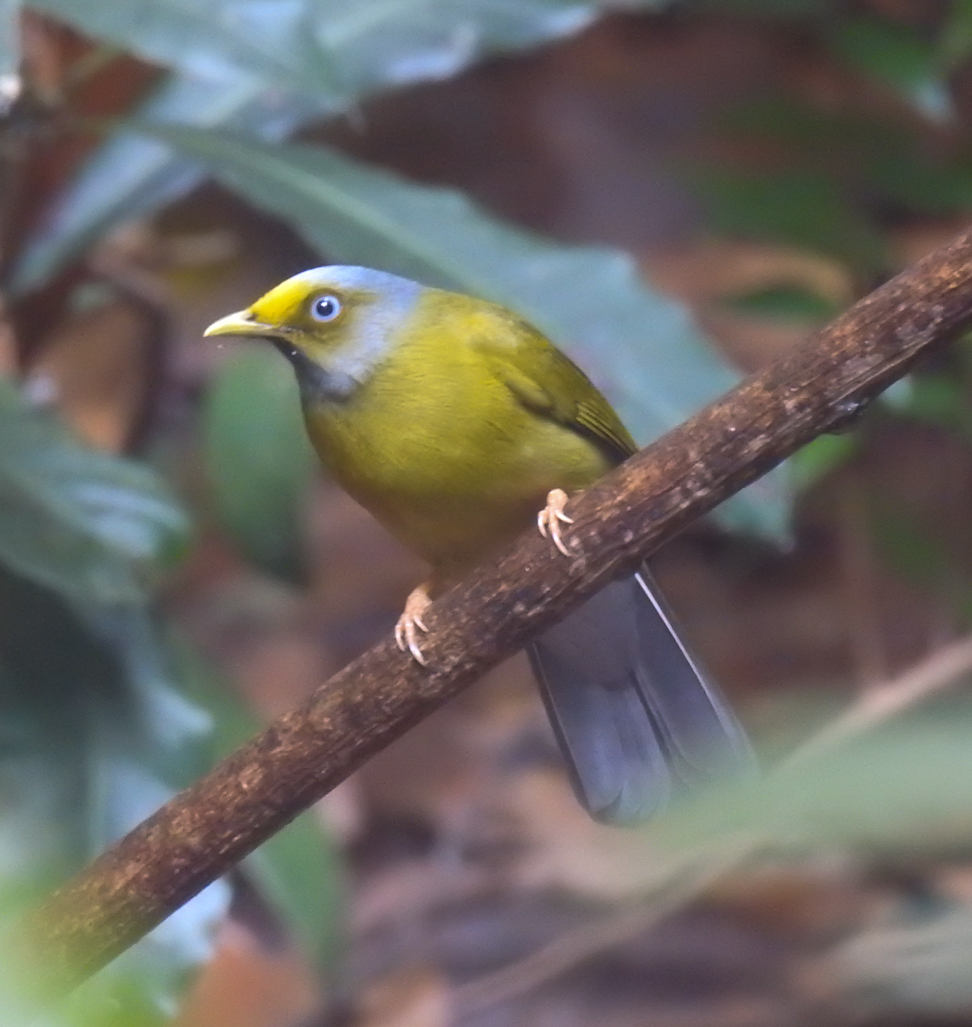
- At Udupi, Karnataka, India

Conservation status
- Least Concern (IUCN 3.1)

Scientific classification
- Kingdom: Animalia
- Phylum: Chordata
- Class: Aves
- Order: Passeriformes
- Family: Pycnonotidae
- Genus: Microtarsus
- Species: M. priocephalus

Binomial name
- Microtarsus priocephalus (Jerdon, 1839)
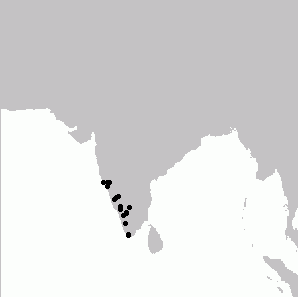

Synonyms
- Pycnonotus prioocephalus; Brachypodius poiocephalus; Brachypus priocephalus; Ixos fisquetti Eydoux & Souleyet, 1842; Micropus phaeocephalus; Microtarsus poioicephalus; Brachypodius priocephalus

Audio
- Calling in background, with louder barbet calls

= Grey-headed bulbul =

Species of bird

The grey-headed bulbul (Microtarsus priocephalus) is a member of the bulbul family, Pycnonotidae. It is endemic to the Western Ghats in south-western India, and found from Goa south to Tamil Nadu at altitudes up to 1200m. It is found in dense reeds or thickets mainly near rivers and swampy areas inside forests. They have a distinctive call that reveals their presence inside dense vegetation where they are hard to spot.

== Taxonomy and systematics ==
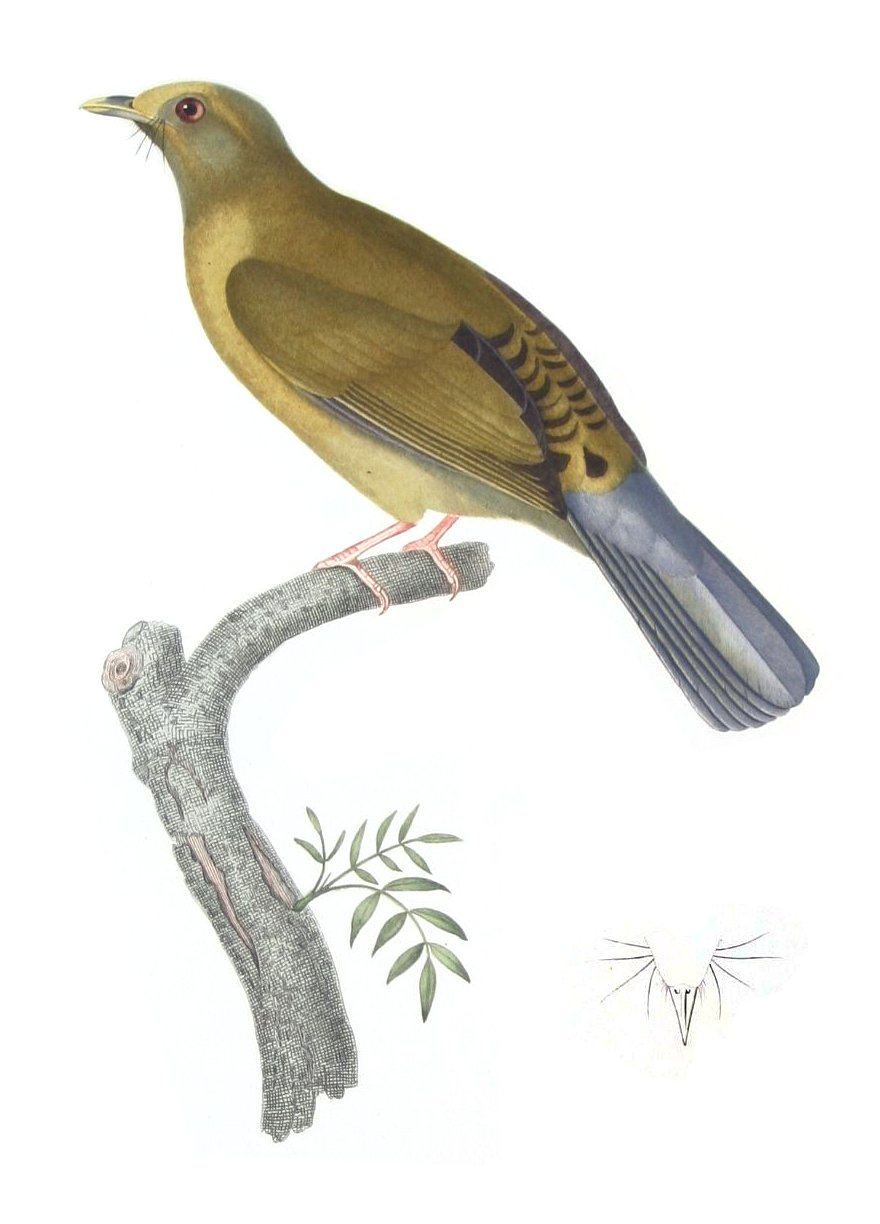
Illustration from the Voyage autour du monde exécuté pendant les années 1836 et 1837 sur la corvette La Bonite commandée par M. Vaillant (The voyage of the Bonita)

The grey-headed bulbul was originally described by Thomas Jerdon under the name of Brachypus priocephalus. It was moved to Brachypodius poiocephalus by Edward Blyth, who erroneously "emended" the species epithet, with subsequent confusion in the literature. Formerly, some authorities placed this species within the genus Ixos and later Pycnonotus.

The genus Pycnonotus was found to be polyphyletic in molecular phylogeny studies and the species returned to Brachypodius.

In 2025 the species was moved to a more broadly defined Microtarsus by the AviList team.

The common name 'grey-headed bulbul' is also used as an alternate name for the yellow-bellied bulbul.

== Description ==
This bulbul is resident in moist broad-leaved evergreen forest with bamboo and dense undergrowth. Its plumage is olive-green, with a medium-grey on the crown head, nape and throat. The forehead is yellow-green. The back and wings are olive-green becoming lighter towards the vent. The rump has yellowing green feathers edged in black giving a barred appearance. The flanks are dark and grey edged. The undertail coverts are grey. The beak is greenish and grey while the legs are pinkish yellow. The iris is distinctly bluish white. The tail is grey on the central feathers (the shaft being black), the outer ones are black and are broadly tipped with grey. Both sexes are similar but juveniles have the head dark olive with the yellow on the forehead duller. (Length 143-152mm; head 33-35mm; tail 74-77mm) The call is a sharp chraink. The call is distinct in having a single syllable unlike those of the core genus Pycnonotus members.

== Behaviour and ecology ==
Found singly or in small groups, grey-headed bulbuls actively join mixed-species foraging flocks during the non-breeding season.

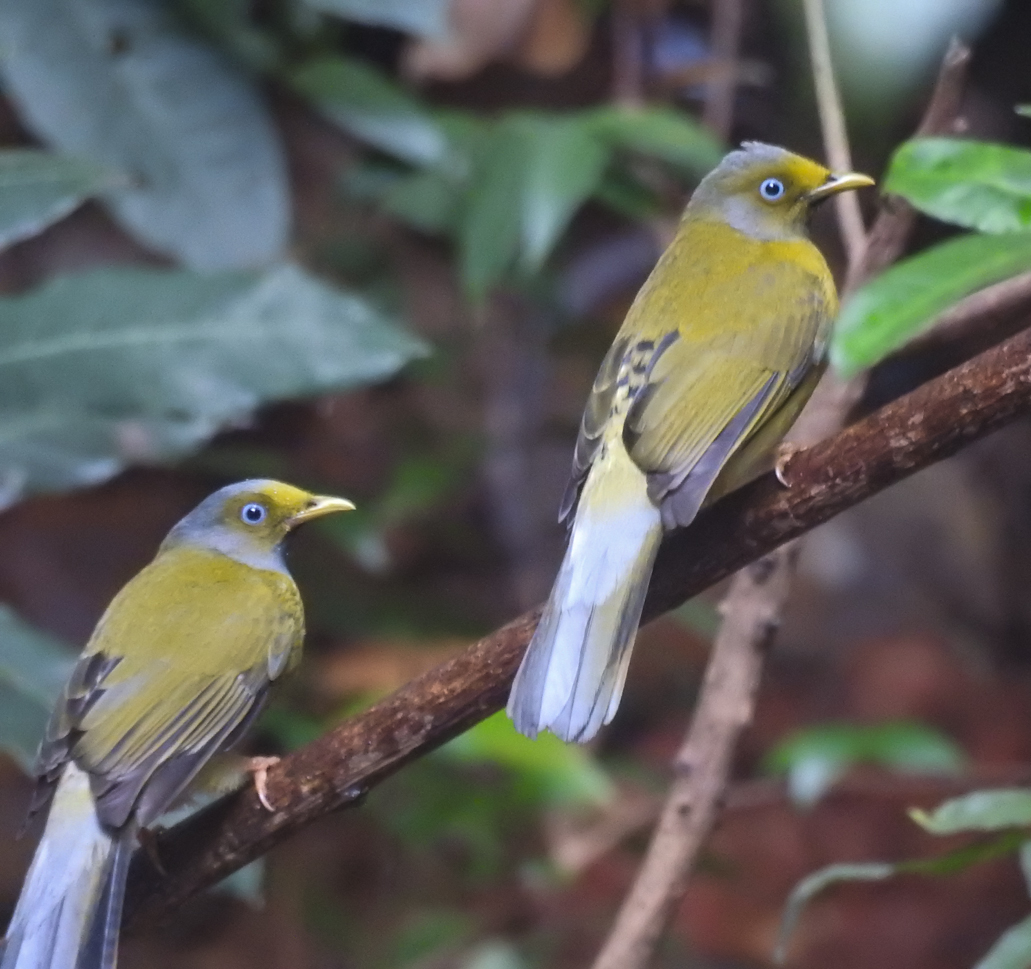
A pair

=== Breeding ===
Grey-headed bulbuls breed from January to June with a peak in April. The nest is a typical platform placed inside a low bush. They build their nest over a period of a week using vines, grasses or leaves. Many nests in a study in the Silent Valley National park were found to be made on saplings of Syzygium species or in reeds of Ochlandra travancorica. The typical clutch is one egg or sometimes two eggs that are incubated for 12 to 14 days. Eggs are sometimes destroyed and eaten by palm squirrels (Funambulus tristriatus). The eggs are pale pink to lavender and flecked in red, more densely on the broad end. Both parents take part in incubation and feeding. The nestlings leave the nest after 11 to 13 days.

=== Feeding ===
The diet consists mainly of fruits (>65%) and invertebrates (>30%). Fruits include those of Symplocos cochinchinensis, Antidesma menasu, Clerodendrum viscosum, Syzygium cumini, Litsea floribunda, Maesa indica, Callicarpa tomentosa, Leea indica and Lantana camara.

== Other sources ==
- Balakrishnan, Peroth (2007). Status, distribution and ecology of Grey-headed Bulbul Pycnonotus priocephalus in the Western Ghats, India. Ph.D. thesis. Bharathiar University, Coimbatore.
