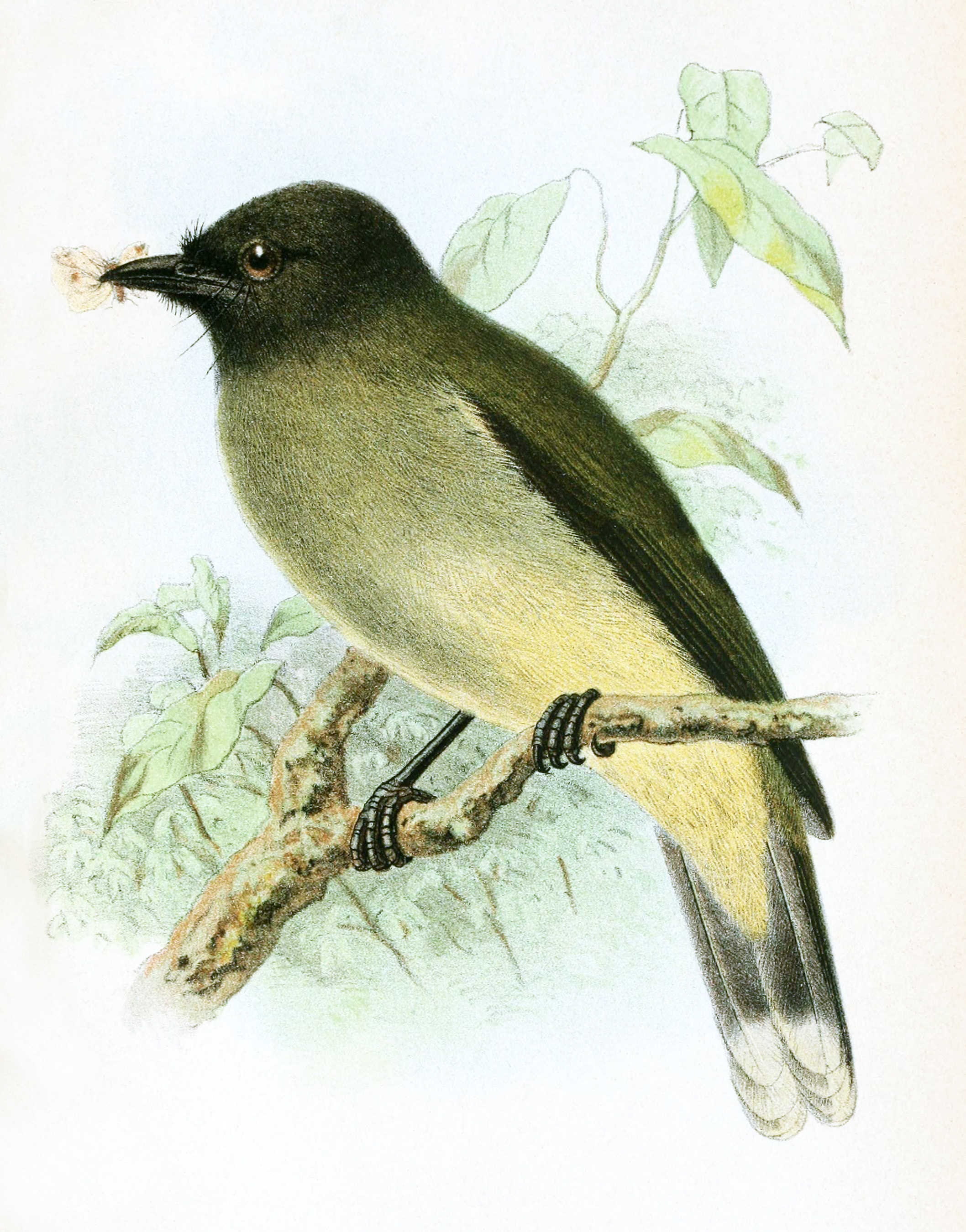

Conservation status
- Data Deficient (IUCN 3.1)

Scientific classification
- Kingdom: Animalia
- Phylum: Chordata
- Class: Aves
- Order: Passeriformes
- Family: Pycnonotidae
- Genus: Microtarsus
- Species: M. nieuwenhuisii

Binomial name
- Microtarsus nieuwenhuisii (Finsch, 1901)
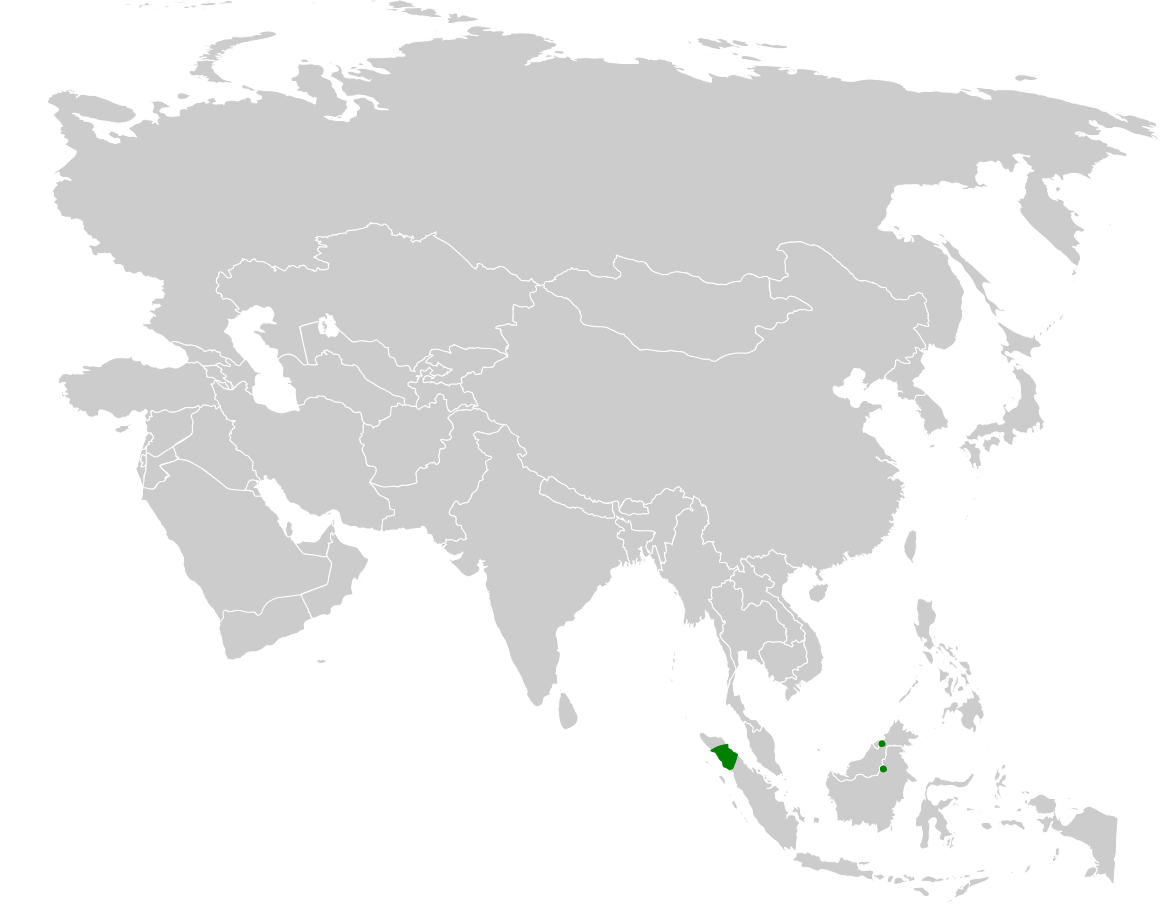

Synonyms
- Poliolophus Nieuwenhuisii (protonym); Pycnonotus nieuwenhuisii; Euptilosus nieuwenhuisii; Brachypodius nieuwenhuisii

= Blue-wattled bulbul =

Species of bird

The blue-wattled bulbul (Microtarsus nieuwenhuisii) is a species of songbird in the bulbul family of passerine birds. The specific epithet commemorates Dutch explorer Anton Willem Nieuwenhuis. The bird is endemic to the islands of Borneo and Sumatra. Its natural habitat is subtropical or tropical moist lowland forests.

== Taxonomy and systematics ==
The status of this rarely seen bird is not known, primarily because it is not clear whether it is in fact a distinct species, or a natural hybrid between the black-headed bulbul and the grey-bellied bulbul or other closely related bulbuls. Alternate names for the blue-wattled bulbul include the Malaysian wattled bulbul, Nieuwenhuis's bulbul and the wattled bulbul.

=== Subspecies ===
Two subspecies are recognized:

- †M. n. inexspectatus - (Chasen, 1939): extinct; once found on Sumatra
- M. n. nieuwenhuisii - (Finsch, 1901): found on Borneo

== Status ==
It may be threatened by habitat loss but is only known from two specimens collected in 1900 and 1937, and few observations. Five sightings of the blue-wattled bulbul were recorded in Batu Apoi Forest Reserve in 1992.
