= Leptomantis rufipes =

Conservation status
- Least Concern (IUCN 3.1)

Scientific classification
- Kingdom: Animalia
- Phylum: Chordata
- Class: Amphibia
- Order: Anura
- Family: Rhacophoridae
- Genus: Leptomantis
- Species: L. rufipes

Binomial name
- Leptomantis rufipes (Inger, 1966)

Synonyms
- Rhacophorus rufipes Inger, 1966

Species of frog

Leptomantis rufipes is a species of frog in the family Rhacophoridae. It is endemic to Borneo and known from isolated locations in south-central Sarawak and eastern Sabah (East Malaysia) and central Kalimantan (Indonesia). Common names Malaysian flying frog and red-legged frog have been coined for this species. The specific name rufipes refers to the red webbing of this frog.

== Description ==
Adult males measure 34–39 mm (1.3–1.5 in) and adult females about 50 mm (2.0 in) in snout–vent length. The body is moderately slender. The snout is sharply pointed. The canthus is sharp. The tympanum is distinct and relatively larger in males than in females. The finger and toe tips are expanded into rounded discs. Both the fingers and the toes are webbed, the toes fully so. The body is pinkish brown above and on the flanks. The back may have dark speckling and irregular spots. A thin, white line runs from the tip of the snout along the canthus to the edge of the eyelid. The throat and chest are yellow-orange. The webbing is deep orange-red.

The male advertisement call is a soft series of chuckles.

== Habitat and conservation ==
Leptomantis rufipes occurs in primary lowland rainforests below 250 m (820 ft) above sea level. Calling males are found in congregations, perched 1.5–3 m above the ground. The species can be locally abundant, but it is threatened by habitat loss caused by logging. It occurs in a few protected areas.
