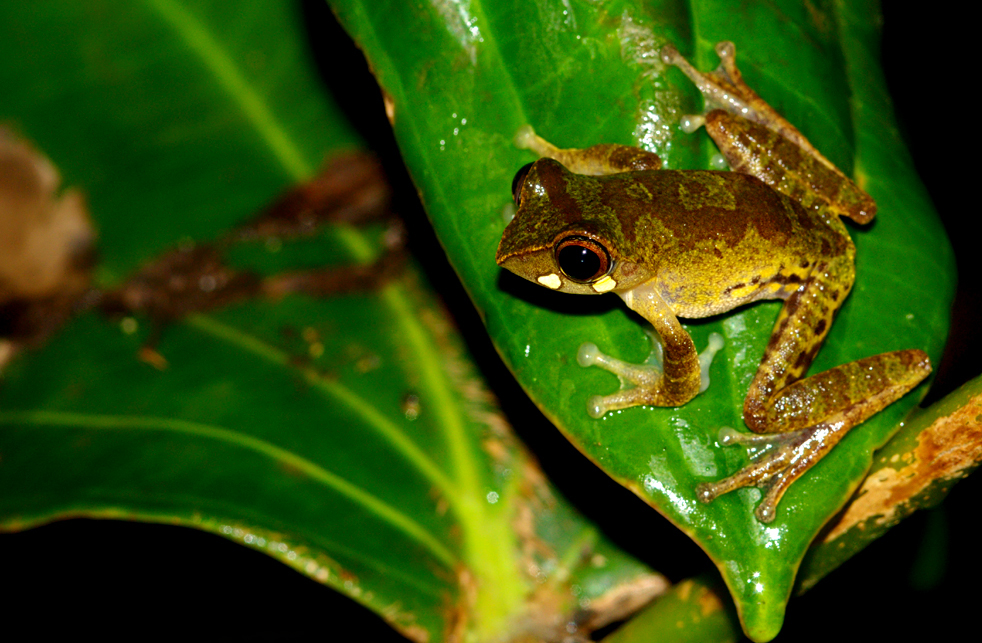
- Leptomantis angulirostris

Scientific classification
- Domain: Eukaryota
- Kingdom: Animalia
- Phylum: Chordata
- Class: Amphibia
- Order: Anura
- Family: Rhacophoridae
- Subfamily: Rhacophorinae
- Genus: Leptomantis; Peters, 1867

Type species
- Leptomantis bimaculata Peters, 1867

= Leptomantis =

Genus of amphibians

Leptomantis, known as slim treefrogs, is a genus of frogs found from southern peninsular Thailand to the Philippines. Species in the genus Leptomantis were formerly considered part of the genus Rhacophorus.

== Species ==
The following species are recognised in the genus Leptomantis:

- Leptomantis angulirostris (Ahl, 1927)
- Leptomantis belalongensis (Dehling and Grafe, 2008)
- Leptomantis bimaculatus Peters, 1867
- Leptomantis cyanopunctatus (Manthey and Steiof, 1998)
- Leptomantis fasciatus (Boulenger, 1895)
- Leptomantis gadingensis (Das and Haas, 2005)
- Leptomantis gauni (Inger, 1966)
- Leptomantis harrissoni (Inger and Haile, 1959)
- Leptomantis malkmusi (Dehling, 2015)
- Leptomantis penanorum (Dehling, 2008)
- Leptomantis pseudacutirostris (Dehling, 2011)
- Leptomantis robinsonii (Boulenger, 1903)
- Leptomantis rufipes (Inger, 1966)
