= Leptomantis pseudacutirostris =

Conservation status
- Data Deficient (IUCN 3.1)

Scientific classification
- Kingdom: Animalia
- Phylum: Chordata
- Class: Amphibia
- Order: Anura
- Family: Rhacophoridae
- Genus: Leptomantis
- Species: L. pseudacutirostris

Binomial name
- Leptomantis pseudacutirostris (Dehling, 2011)

Synonyms
- Rhacophorus pseudacutirostris Dehling, 2011

Species of frog

Leptomantis pseudacutirostris, the Sumatran sharp-nose tree frog, is a species of frog in the family Rhacophoridae. It is endemic to Indonesia and has been observed in Kerinci Seblat National Park, 1000 meters above sea level.

Scientists classify this frog as data deficient with respect to conservation and risk of extinction. It lives in forests on hills and mountains. They believe the frog breeds in clear, rocky streams.

In 2017, scientists examined the frog's genetic relationship to other rhacophorids and concluded that it may be conspecific with Rhacophorus modestus.

== Original publication ==
- Dehling JM (2011). "Taxonomic status of the population of Rhacophorus angulirostris Ahl, 1927 (Anura: Rhacophoridae) from Sumatera Barat (West Sumatra) and its description as a new species". Salamandra (Abstract). 47 (3): 133–143.
