= Robinson's tree frog =

Conservation status
- Least Concern (IUCN 3.1)

Scientific classification
- Kingdom: Animalia
- Phylum: Chordata
- Class: Amphibia
- Order: Anura
- Family: Rhacophoridae
- Genus: Leptomantis
- Species: L. robinsonii

Binomial name
- Leptomantis robinsonii (Boulenger, 1903)

Synonyms
- Rhacophorus robinsonii Boulenger, 1903

Species of amphibian

Robinson's tree frog (Leptomantis robinsonii) is a species of frog in the family Rhacophoridae found in Malaysia and Thailand. It has been observed between 152 and 762 meters above sea level.

This frog lives in primary forest and undisturbed secondary forest. It breeds through larval development in stagnant water.

Scientists classify this frog as of least concern of extinction because of its large range and presumed large population. However, it may face some threat from Malaysia's widespread deforestation, principally that associated with palm oil plantations and logging.
