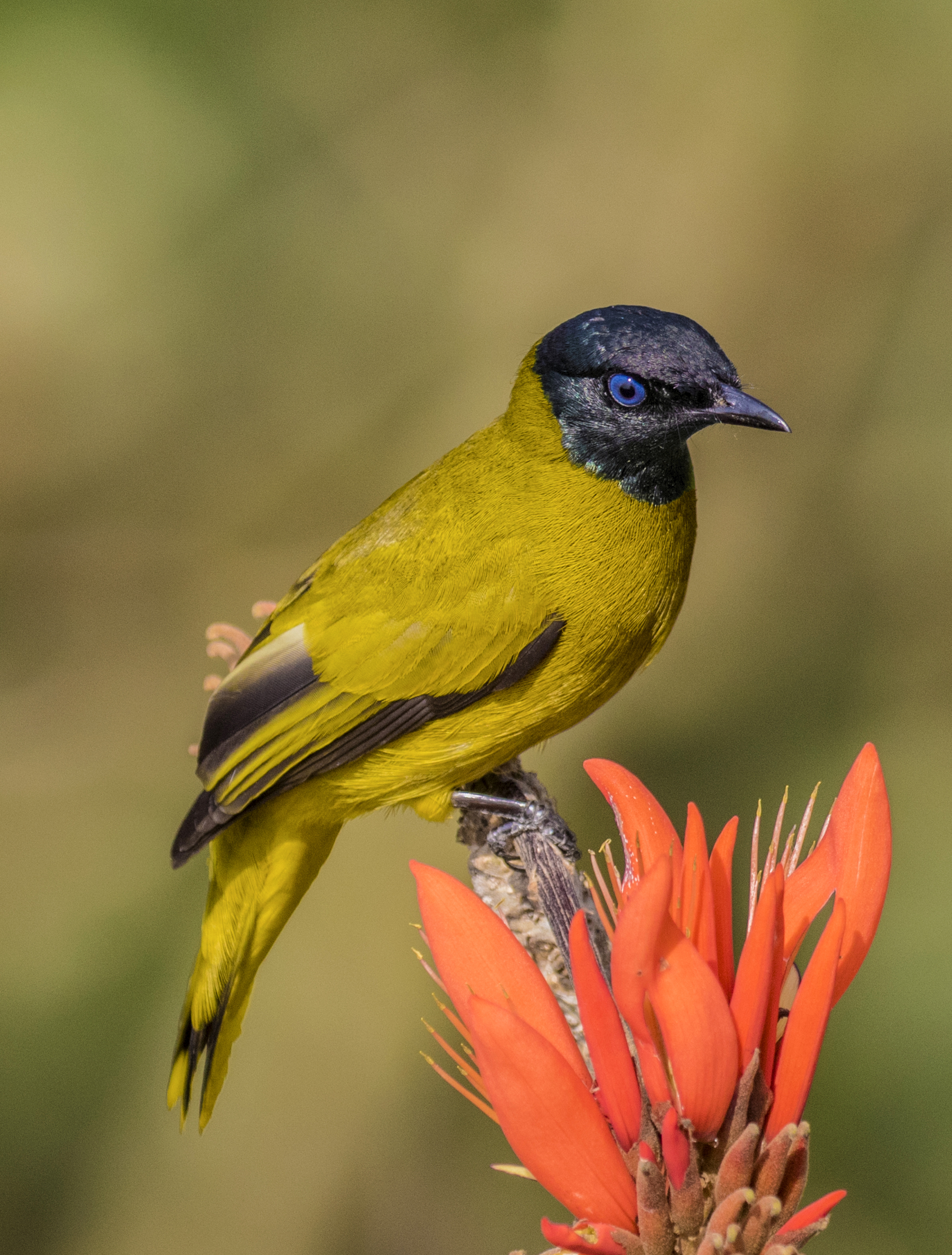
- Black-headed bulbul (Microtarsus melanocephalos)

Scientific classification
- Kingdom: Animalia
- Phylum: Chordata
- Class: Aves
- Order: Passeriformes
- Family: Pycnonotidae
- Genus: Microtarsus; Eyton, 1839

Type species
- Microtarsus melanoleucos Eyton, 1839

Synonyms
- Brachypodius Blyth, 1845; Euptilotus Reichenbach, 1850; Poliolophus Sharpe, 1877

= Microtarsus =

Genus of birds

Microtarsus is a genus of passerine birds in the bulbul family, Pycnonotidae, that are found in South and Southeast Asia.

== Taxonomy ==
The genus Microtarsus was introduced in 1839 by the English naturalist Thomas Campbell Eyton to accommodate a single species, Microtarsus melanoleucos Eyton, the black-and-white bulbul. This is the type species. The species now placed in this genus were formerly included in the genus Pycnonotus. A molecular phylogenetic study of the bulbul family published in 2017 found that Pycnonotus was polyphyletic. In the revision to create monophyletic genera Microtarsus was resurrected to contain the black-headed bulbul that was previously placed in Pycnonotus. In 2025 AviList adopted more inclusive genera and merged Brachypodius, Euptilotus and Poliolophus into Microtarsus.

The genus contains the following seven species:

Image	Common name	Scientific name	Distribution
	Puff-backed bulbul	Microtarsus eutilotus	Malay Peninsula, Sumatra, Bangka Island, and Borneo
	Black-and-white bulbul	Microtarsus melanoleucos	southern Malay Peninsula, Sumatra, Siberut Island, and Borneo
	Yellow-wattled bulbul	Microtarsus urostictus	Philippines (except Palawan group, Mindoro, most of Western Visayas and Sulu Archipelago)
	Grey-headed bulbul	Microtarsus priocephalus	southwestern peninsular India (southern Maharashtra and Goa to western Mysore and Kerala)
	Black-headed bulbul	Microtarsus melanocephalos	east Bangladesh and northeast India through south China, Vietnam, Borneo, Java and Bali
	Andaman bulbul	Microtarsus fuscoflavescens	Andaman Islands
	Blue-wattled bulbul	Microtarsus nieuwenhuisii	Sumatra and Borneo
