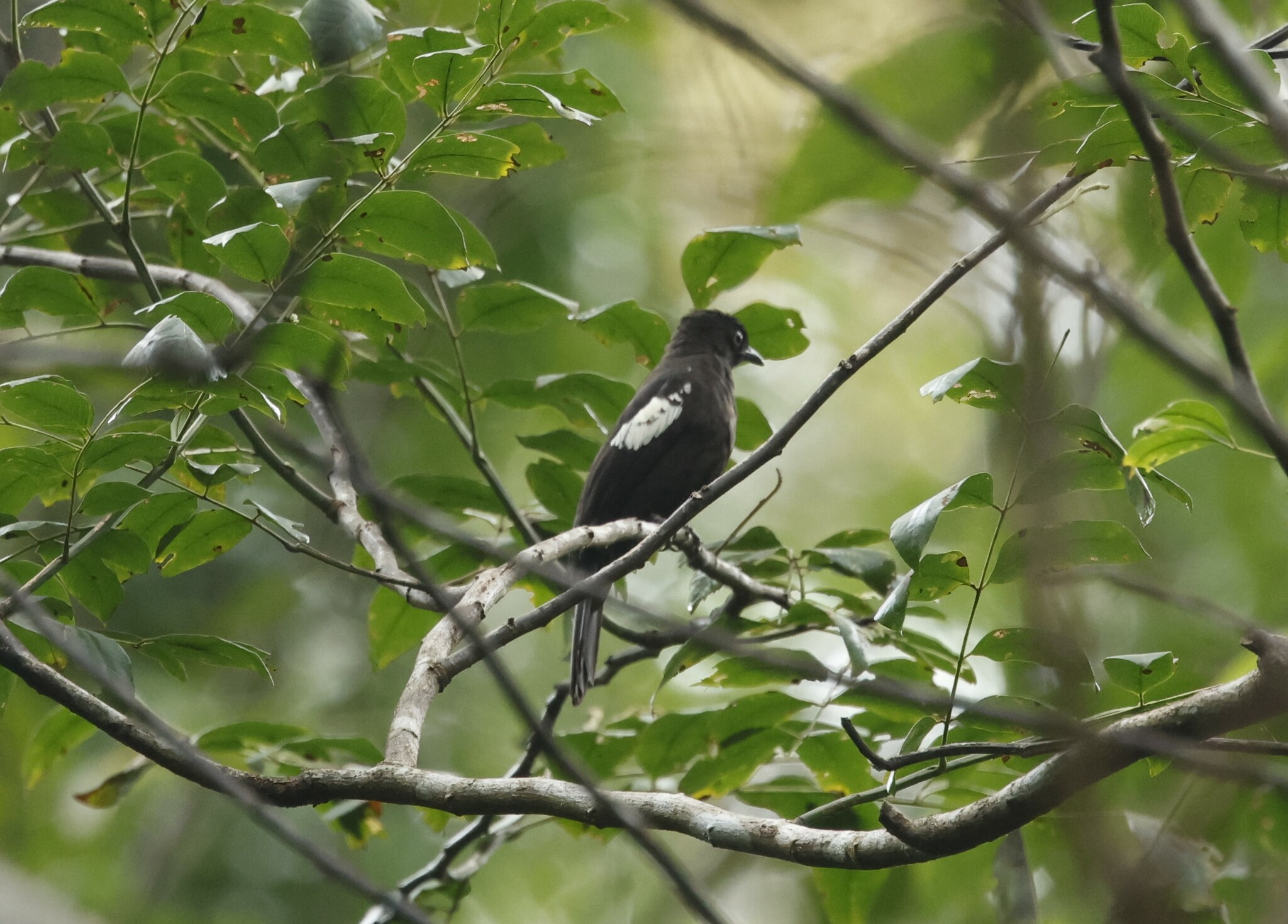

Conservation status
- Near Threatened (IUCN 3.1)

Scientific classification
- Kingdom: Animalia
- Phylum: Chordata
- Class: Aves
- Order: Passeriformes
- Family: Pycnonotidae
- Genus: Microtarsus
- Species: M. melanoleucos

Binomial name
- Microtarsus melanoleucos Eyton, 1839
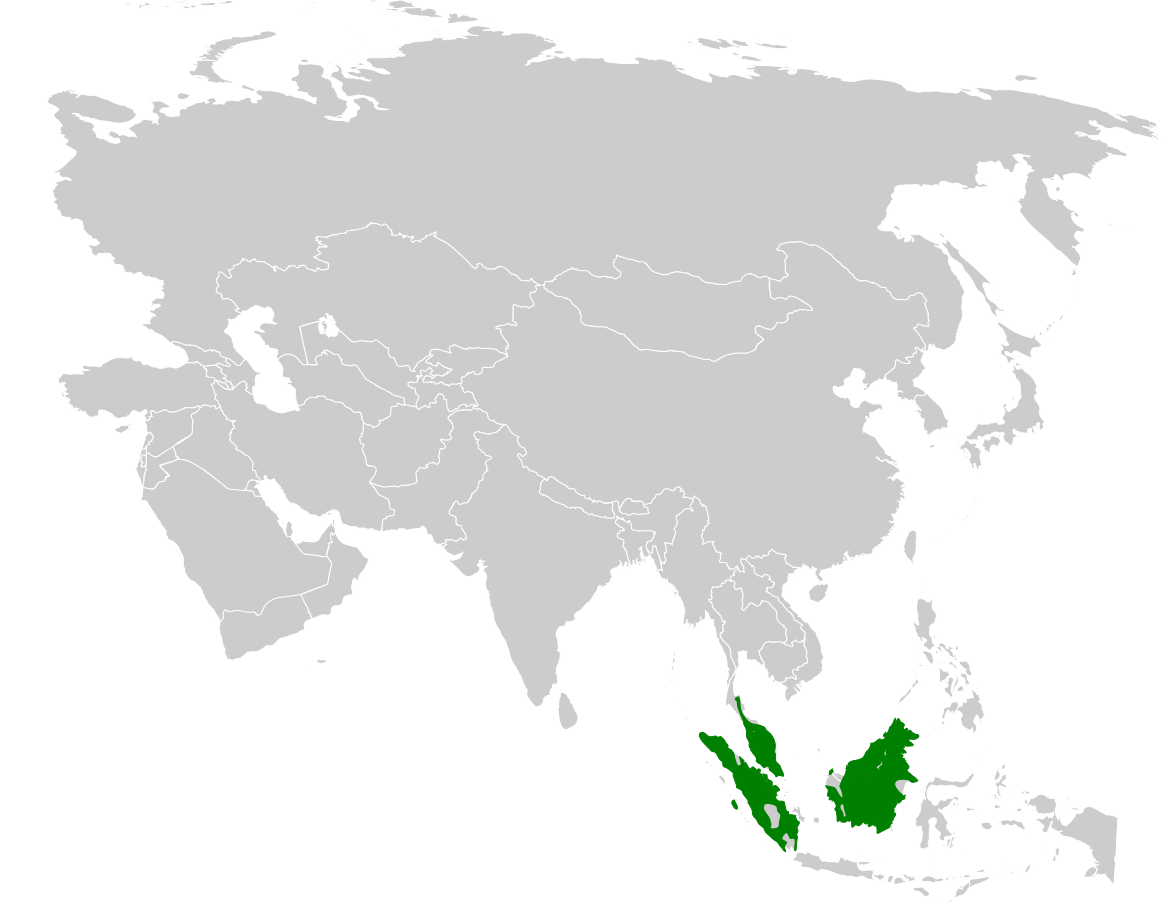

Synonyms
- Pycnonotus melanoleucos; Brachypodius melanoleucos; Pycnonotus melanoleucus (Eyton, 1839)

= Black-and-white bulbul =

Species of songbird

The black-and-white bulbul (Microtarsus melanoleucos) is a species of songbird in the bulbul family, Pycnonotidae. It is found on the Malay Peninsula, Sumatra, and Borneo. Its natural habitats are subtropical or tropical moist lowland forest and subtropical or tropical moist montane forest. It is threatened by habitat loss.
