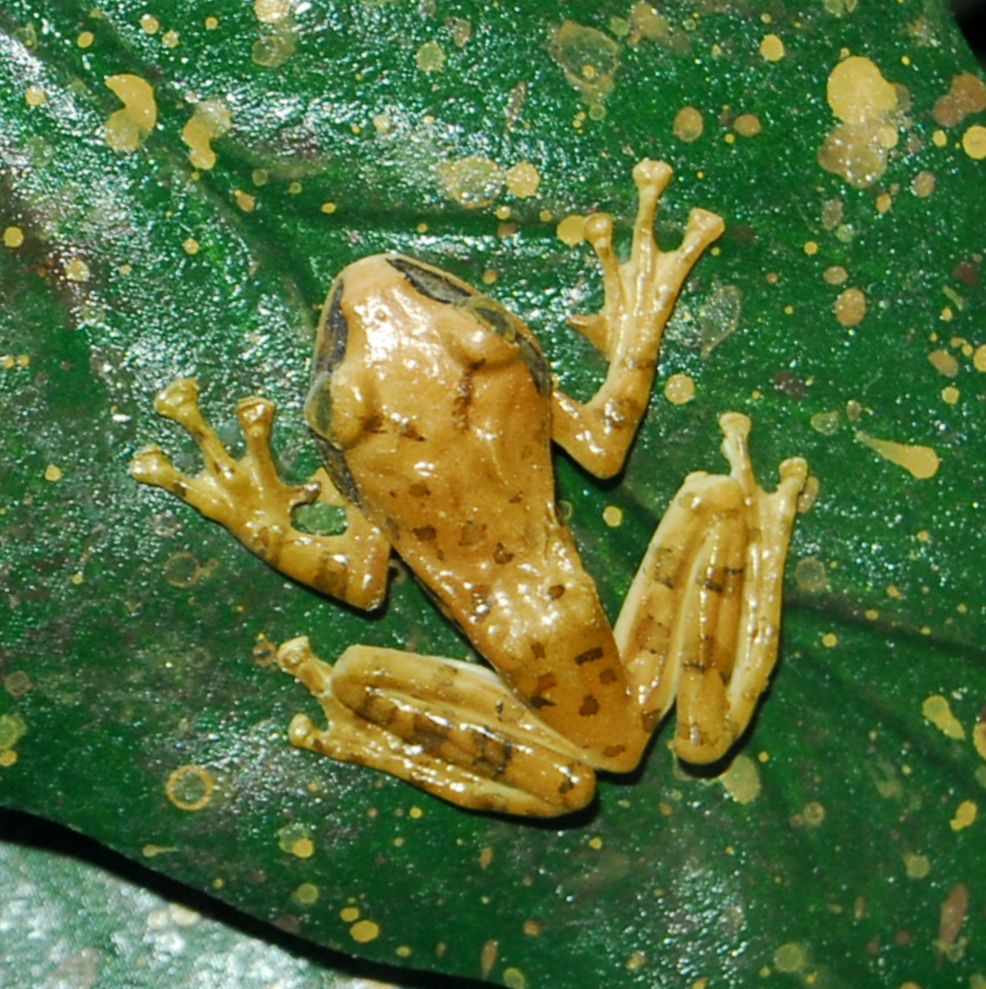

Conservation status
- Least Concern (IUCN 3.1)

Scientific classification
- Kingdom: Animalia
- Phylum: Chordata
- Class: Amphibia
- Order: Anura
- Family: Rhacophoridae
- Genus: Leptomantis
- Species: L. harrissoni

Binomial name
- Leptomantis harrissoni (Inger and Haile, 1959)

Synonyms
- Rhacophorus harrissoni Inger and Haile, 1959

= Leptomantis harrissoni =

Species of frog

Leptomantis harrissoni, common name Harrisson's flying frog or brown tree frog, is a species of frog in the family Rhacophoridae. It is endemic to northern Borneo.

== Distribution ==
This species is widely distributed in northern Borneo and occurs in Sarawak and Sabah (Malaysia), Brunei, and northern Kalimantan (Indonesia).

== Habitat ==
Its natural habitat is primary or old secondary lowland rainforests in both flat and hilly terrain below 350 m of elevation. It is threatened by habitat loss.

== Description ==
Leptomantis harrissoni can reach a length of about 50 millimetres (2.0 in) in males, of about 70 millimetres (2.8 in) in females. These medium-sized frogs have an angular and pointed snout and well developed dark hand webbing. They are basically brown.

Tadpoles can reach a length of about 40 millimetres (1.6 in), They have a well developed and rather pointed tail fin, an ovoid body and a short snout. The basic color is dark brown.

== Biology ==
Leptomantis harrissoni spends most of its life high up in the forest. Males call for breeding in water-containing holes located in the trunks of trees. Eggs are laid in a foam nest attached to the bark above said tree holes.

These frogs use the skin membranes between their fingers as a kind of parachute to make real flights among the branches of trees of the forest (hence the common name of the species).
