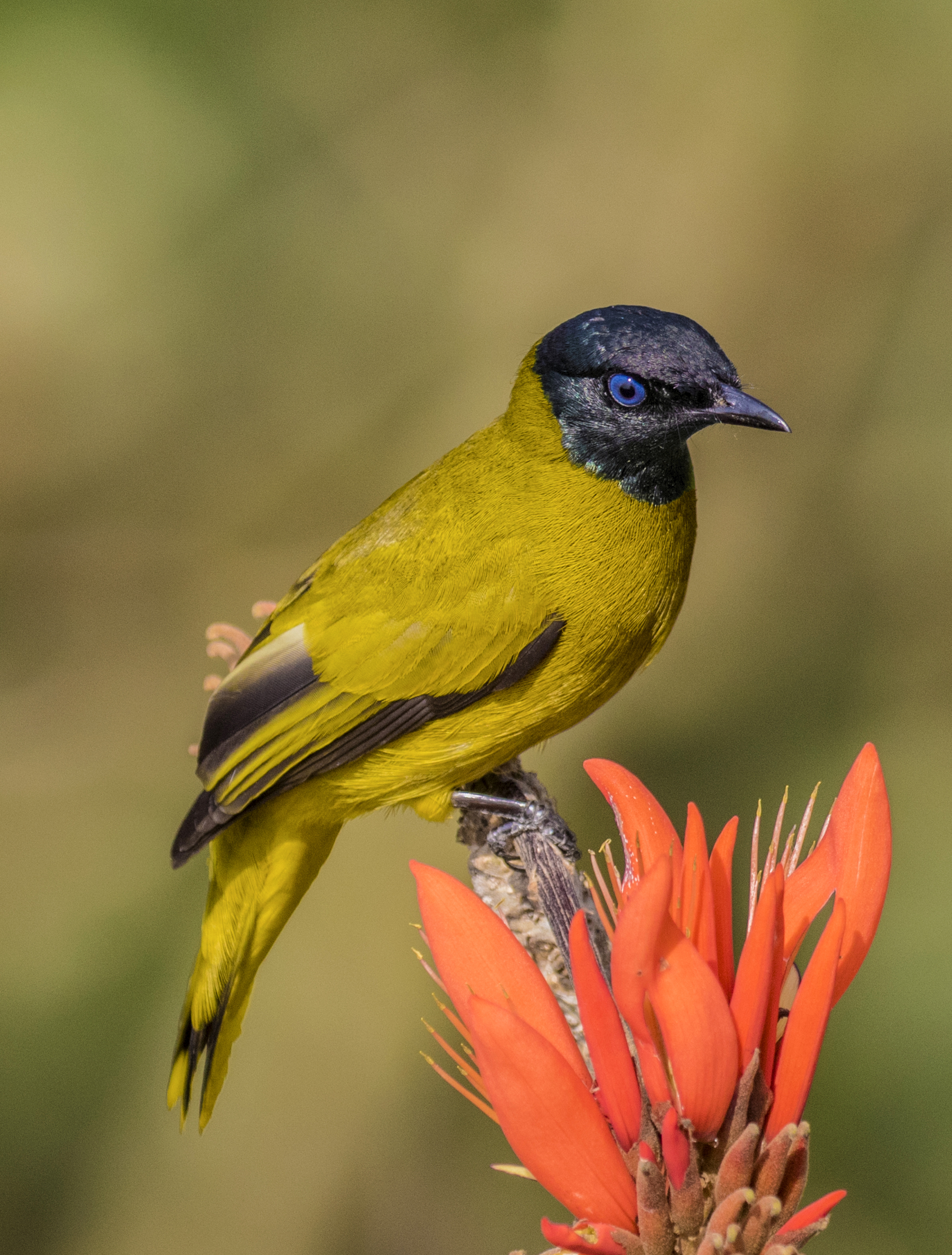
- In Bangladesh

Conservation status
- Least Concern (IUCN 3.1)

Scientific classification
- Kingdom: Animalia
- Phylum: Chordata
- Class: Aves
- Order: Passeriformes
- Family: Pycnonotidae
- Genus: Microtarsus
- Species: M. melanocephalos

Binomial name
- Microtarsus melanocephalos (Gmelin, JF, 1788)
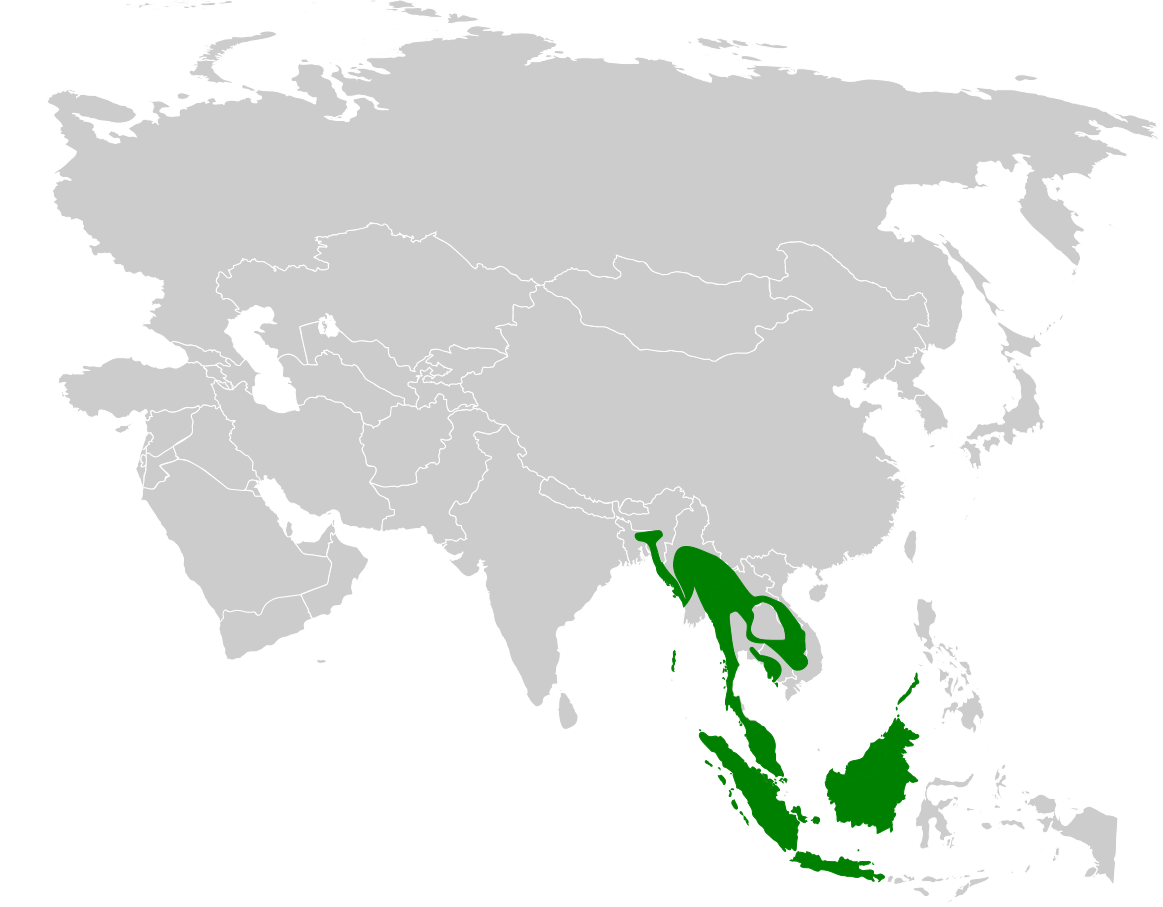

Synonyms
- Brachypodius atriceps; Pycnonotus atriceps; Pycnonotus atriceps; Turdus atriceps; Brachypodius melanocephalos

= Black-headed bulbul =

Species of bird

The black-headed bulbul (Microtarsus melanocephalos) is a member of the bulbul family, Pycnonotidae. It is found in forests in south-eastern Asia.

== Taxonomy ==
The black-headed bulbul was formally described in 1788 by the German naturalist Johann Friedrich Gmelin in his revised and expanded edition of Carl Linnaeus's Systema Naturae. He placed it with the shrikes in the genus Lanius and coined the binomial name Lanius melanocephalos. The specific epithet combines the Ancient Greek melas meaning "black" with -kephalos meaning "-headed". Gmelin based his account on the "black-headed shrike" that had been described and illustrated in 1781 by the English ornithologist John Latham in his multi-volume work A General Synopsis of Birds. Latham did not specify the origin of his specimen but Gmelin gave the locality as the Sandwich Islands. This was an error and the type locality was designated as Sumatra by the Harry Oberholser in 1912.

Earlier in his book Gmelin used the name Lanius melanocephalus for a variety of the red-backed shrike Lanius collurio. This has led to difficulties with the taxonomy. In 1917 Oberholser argued that under the code of nomenclature then adopted by the American Ornithologists' Union, Lanius melanocephalos was pre-occupied by Lanius melanocephalus and the correct name under the rules would be Turdus atriceps Temminck 1822. Oberholser's proposal was generally adopted and atriceps was used as the specific epithet. In 2018 it was pointed out that under the International Code of Zoological Nomenclature published in 1999 the two names are not homonyms (and if they were Lanius melanocephalos would have priority as it was applied to a species rather than a variety). Gmelin is again now recognised as the authority for this species. The black-headed bulbul was formerly placed in the genus Pycnonotus but when this genus was found to be polyphyletic it was moved to the genus Brachypodius that had been introduced in 1845 by the English zoologist Edward Blyth. In 2025 in was moved a more broadly defined Microtarsus by the AviList team.

Until 2008, the Andaman bulbul was considered as a subspecies of the black-headed bulbul.

Four subspecies are recognized:

- M. m. melanocephalos (Gmelin, JF, 1788) [synonym B. m. atriceps (Temminck, 1822)]: found in north-eastern India and Bangladesh though Southeast Asia to the Greater Sunda Islands and western Philippines
- M. m. hyperemnus Oberholser, 1912: Found on western Sumatran islands
- M. m. baweanus (Finsch, 1901): originally described as a separate species. Found on Bawean (north of Java)
- M. m. hodiernus Bangs & Peters, JL, 1927: originally described as a separate species. Found on Maratua Island (off eastern Borneo)

== Description ==
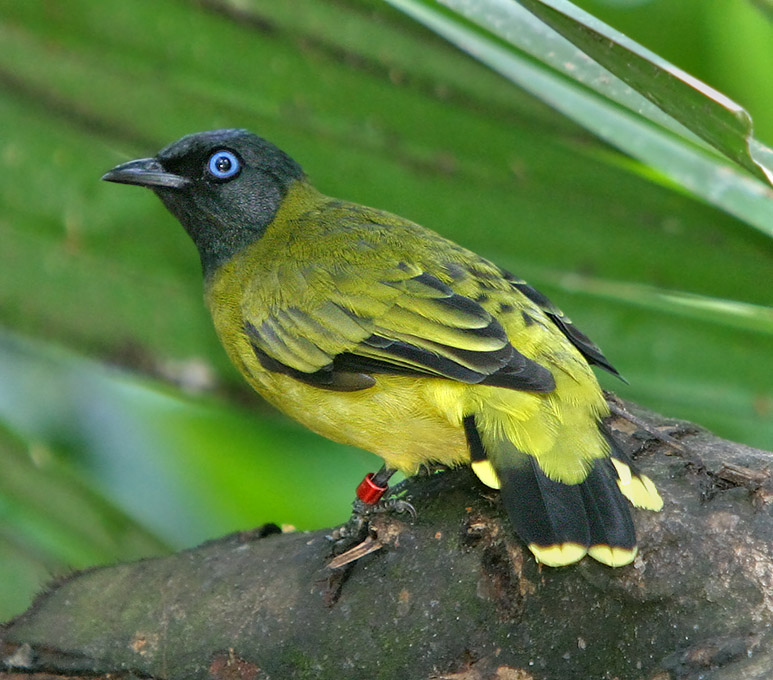

The black-headed bulbul is 16–18 cm (6.3–7.1 in) in overall length and weighs 20–30 g (0.71–1.06 oz). It has a mainly olive-yellow plumage with a glossy bluish-black head. A rare grey morph where most of the olive-yellow is replaced by grey also exists. It resembles the black-crested bulbul, but has blue eyes (though not reliable in juveniles), a broad yellow tip to the tail, and never shows a crest (however, some subspecies of the black-crested are also essentially crestless, but they have red or yellow throats).

== Behavior and ecology ==
The black-headed bulbul feeds mainly on small fruit and berries, but will also take insects. It commonly occurs in small flocks of 6-8 individuals.
