= Blue-spotted tree frog =

Conservation status
- Least Concern (IUCN 3.1)

Scientific classification
- Kingdom: Animalia
- Phylum: Chordata
- Class: Amphibia
- Order: Anura
- Family: Rhacophoridae
- Genus: Leptomantis
- Species: L. cyanopunctatus

Binomial name
- Leptomantis cyanopunctatus (Manthey & Steiof, 1998)

Synonyms
- Rhacophorus cyanopunctatus Manthey & Steiof, 1998

Species of amphibian

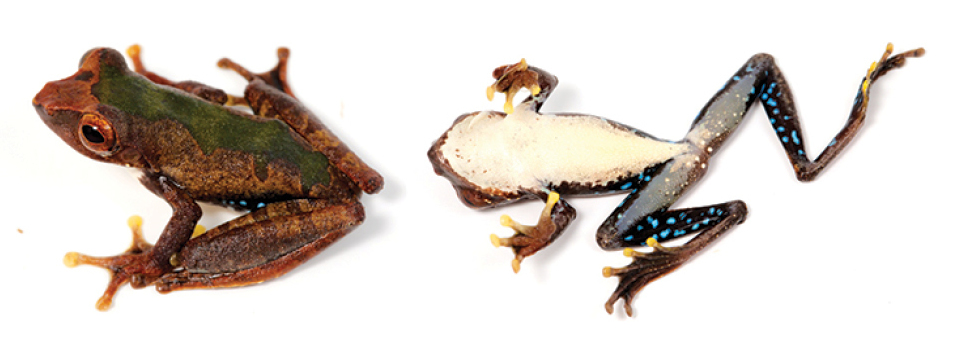
Pairs of photos (dorsolateral and ventral) depict the same individual.

The blue-spotted tree frog (Leptomantis cyanopunctatus) is a species of frog in the family Rhacophoridae. It is found in Indonesia, Malaysia, Singapore, Thailand, Vietnam, and Brunei and possibly Myanmar.

This frog has been observed in primary and secondary forests growing in swamps, flat areas, and hills as high as 600 meters above sea level. Male frogs perch roughly 2.5 meters above the ground near streams and call for the females. Scientists believe that the female frog lays eggs in streams.

Scientists classify this frog as at least concern of extinction because of its large range. There are a few protected parks within it. Deforestation may pose some issue through habitat loss.

This frog is used for medical research on a small scale.
