= Batu Apoi Forest Reserve =

Batu Apoi Forest Reserve Batu Apoi National Park
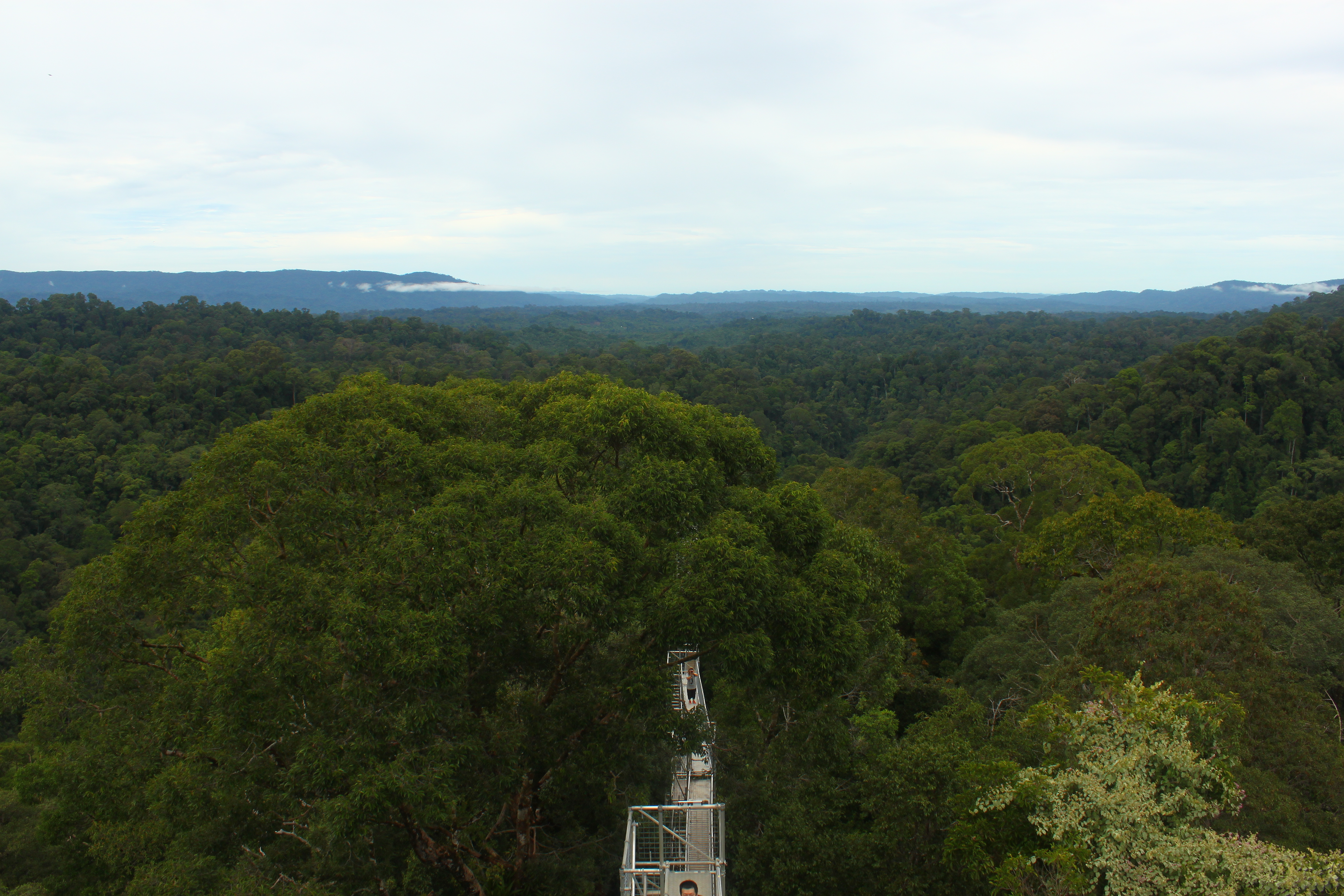
- Rain Forests of Brunei

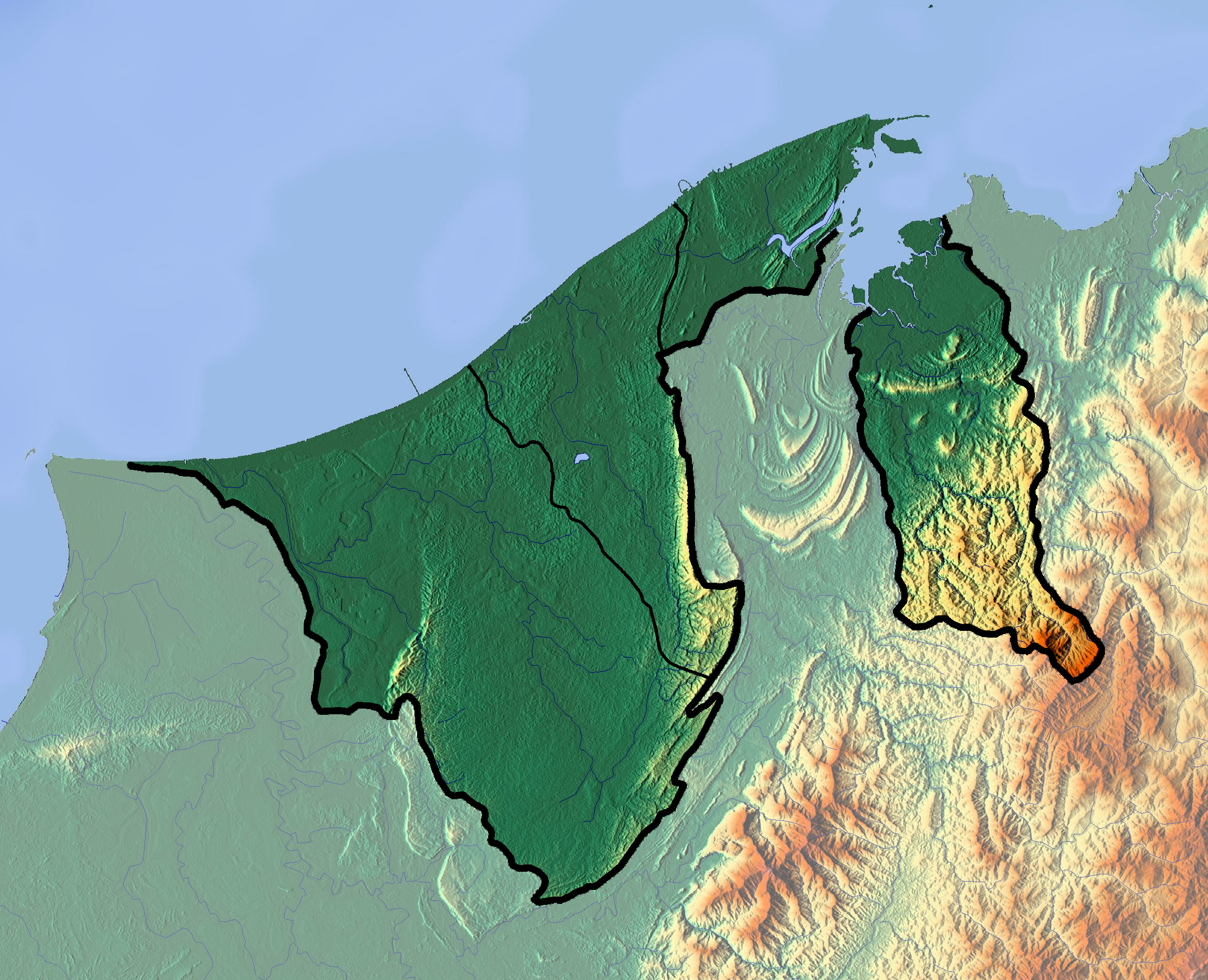
- Location within Brunei
- Nearest city: Brunei Darussalam
- Coordinates: 4°36′00″N 115°11′00″E
- Area: 50,000 hectares (120,000 acres)
- Established: 1991

Batu Apoi Forest Reserve is located in Batu Apoi in the Temburong District of Brunei. The Ulu Temburong National Park is located within the reserve. Its mountains reach altitudes of 1,000 metres (3,300 ft) around its southeastern borders. The region features the shale lithology known as Setap Shale, and sometimes as Temburong Formation. River channels, V-shaped valleys, and mixed Dipterocarp rainforest also characterize the forest reserve.
