= Ulu Temburong National Park =

National park in Brunei

Ulu Temburong National Park Green Jewel of Brunei
- IUCN category II (national park)
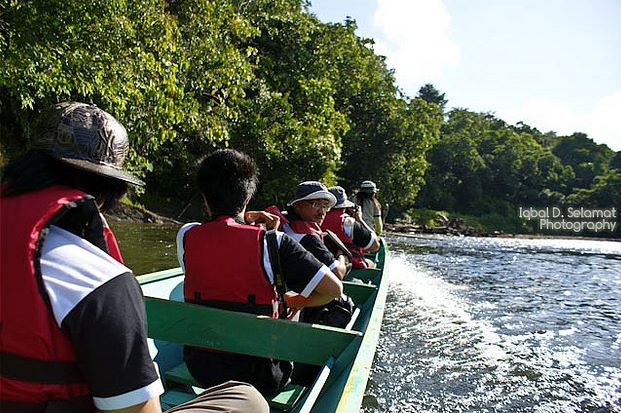
- Journey by long boat on Temburong River to Ulu Temburong National Park

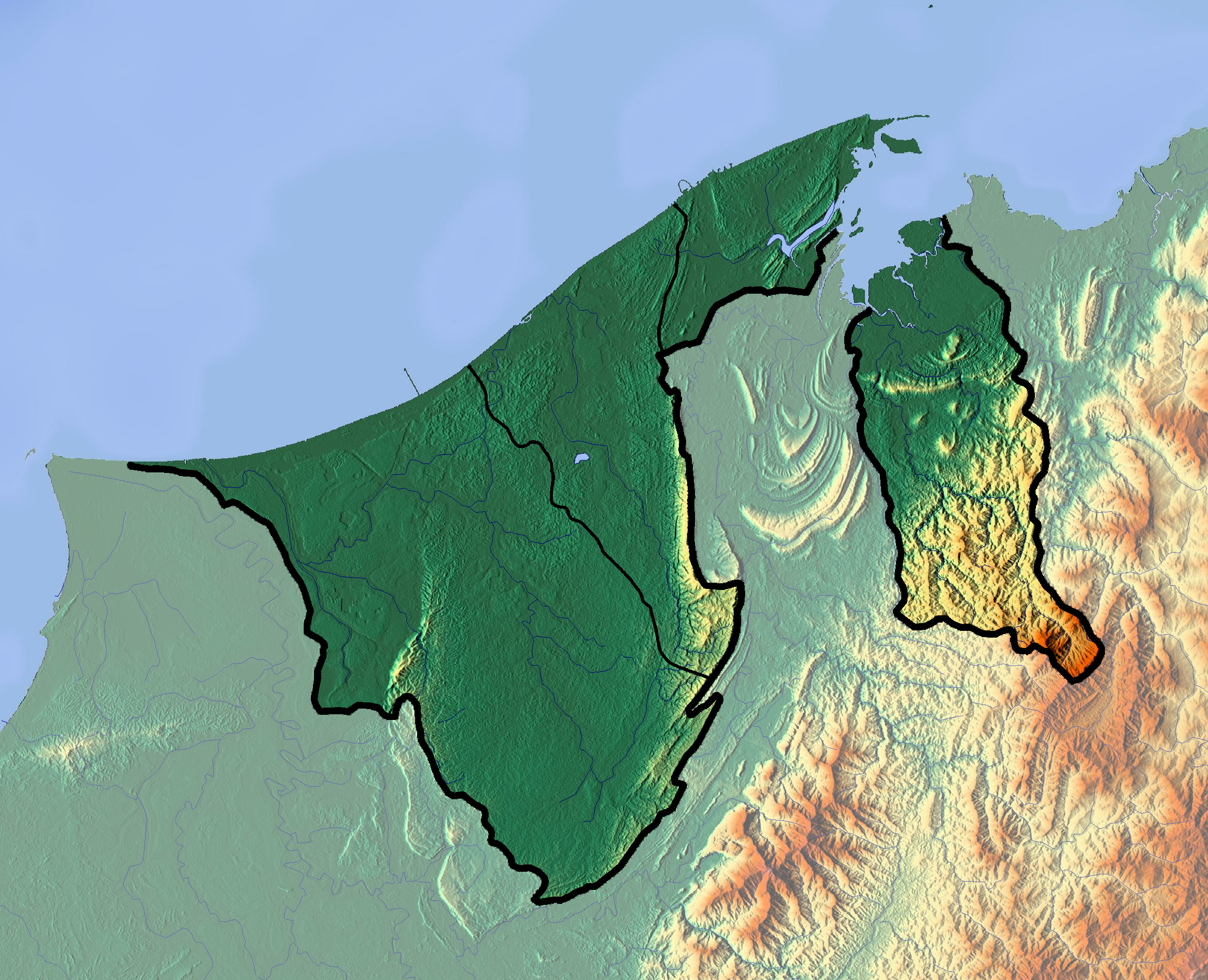
- Location within Brunei
- Location: Near
- Nearest city: Brunei Darussalam
- Coordinates: 4°28′41″N 115°12′28″E
- Area: 488.59 square kilometres (188.65 sq mi)
- Established: 1991

Ulu Temburong National Park is the first national park to be established in Brunei, protected since 1991. The park is in Temburong District in eastern Brunei, and covers about 40% of the district in the south at 550 square kilometres (210 sq mi). It is within the Batu Apoi Forest Reserve. The park contains unspoiled jungle and is known as the "Green Jewel of Brunei", described as "the finest example of the sultanate's successful forest protection policy". The principal rivers are the Temburong and Belalong Rivers. It is an important ecotourism centre in Brunei and hosts the Ulu Ulu Resort. The Peradayan Forest Reserve is also located in the district.

== Geography ==
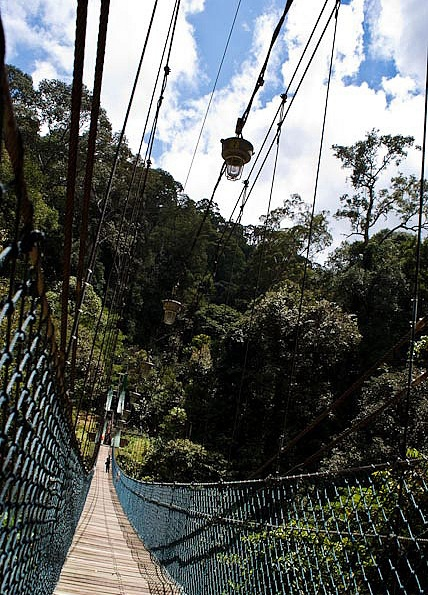
A suspension bridge in Ulu Temburong National Park

Ulu Temburong National Park is situated in the extreme east of Brunei Darussalam, in the Temburong District. It is bounded by three other districts and the Sarawak state of Malaysia. It is a lowland rainforest covering an area of 212 square miles (550 km^{2}). The park area is in the upper region of the eastern part of Brunei. The southern part consists of a hilly region with mountains rising to a height of 1,800 metres (5,900 ft) and the lowlands are in the northern slopes. The terrain is traversed by a number of rivers forming narrow valleys and includes the coastal region.

The park, which can only be reached by river, is only accessed by longboats from Brunei's capital city of Bandar Seri Begawan. The first destination by boat is Bangar town where the Limbang River emerges from Sarawak and drains into Brunei Bay with mangrove muddy deltas at the estuary. Travel from Bangar town to Batang Duri is by road and it is the starting destination for travel by longboats along the Temburong River into the Park. The boats are plied by experienced Iban people winding through sand bars, logs and boulders. An extensive network of boardwalks, bridges and stairways, 7 kilometres (4.3 mi) in length, have been constructed to visit all regions of the park. Interpretation boards provide information along the way. There is also a canopy viewing walkway. This walkway, built with steel towers supporting the cable way, rises to height of 50 metres (160 ft) above the forest floor overlooking the highest tree canopy and provides vistas of the forests.

== Flora ==
Vegetation in the reserve is in the form of tropical lowland rain forests with the Shorea, Dryobalanops and Dipterocarpus genera as the dominant species of trees. The primary lowland and hill forests are Dipterocarp forests, while the lower montane forests are largely in the southern part. Mangroves are seen in the coastal areas. Rattan species are also common at the ground level of the forests. Other common varieties noted in the forest are gingers, begonias, gesneriads, aroids, Ixora blooms. Along the river courses, the plants species noted are palms, ferns, mosses and lichens. Fruiting figs and geocarpic figs on which birds feed are also extensive.

== Fauna ==
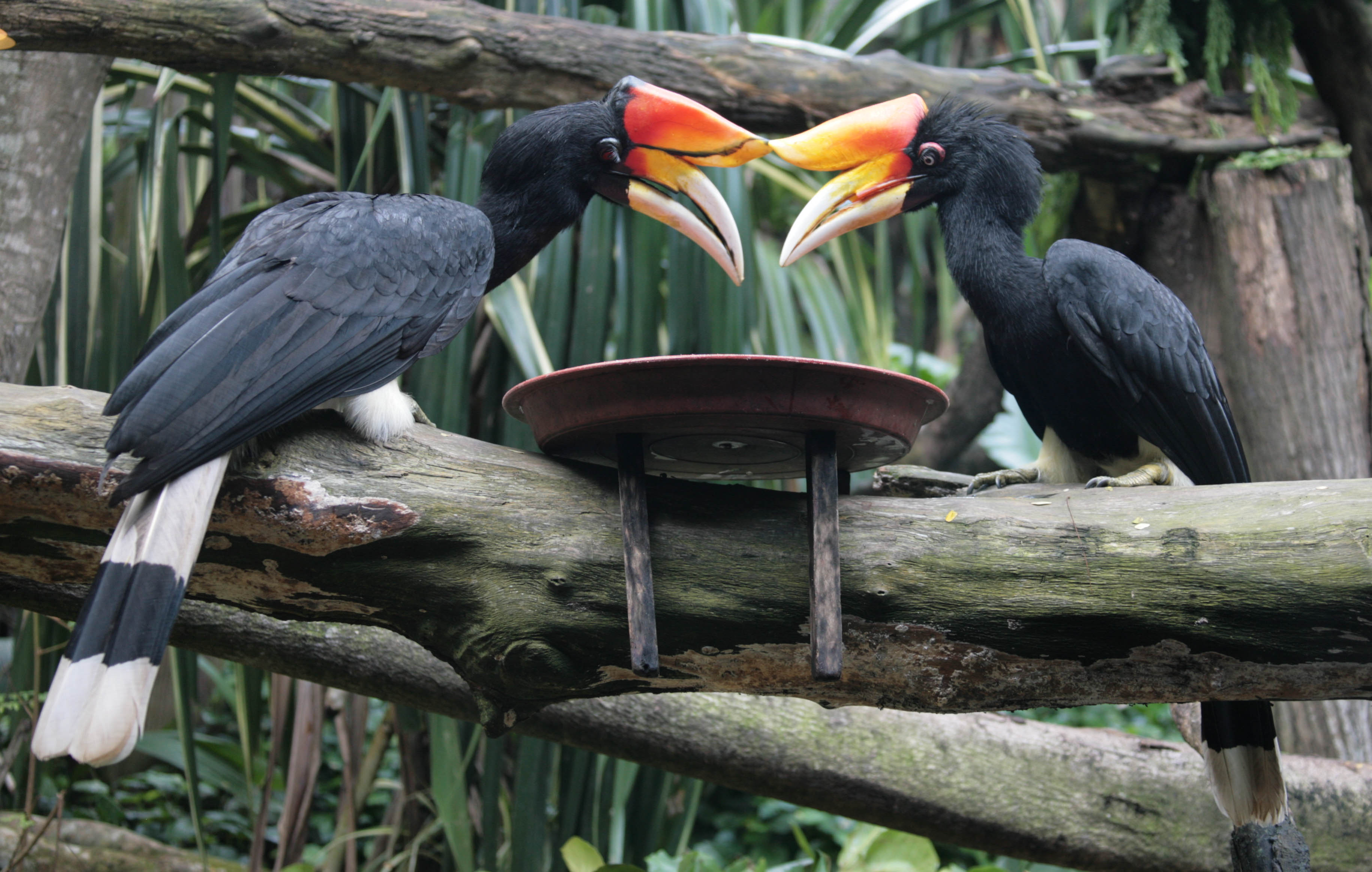
Rhinoceros hornbills

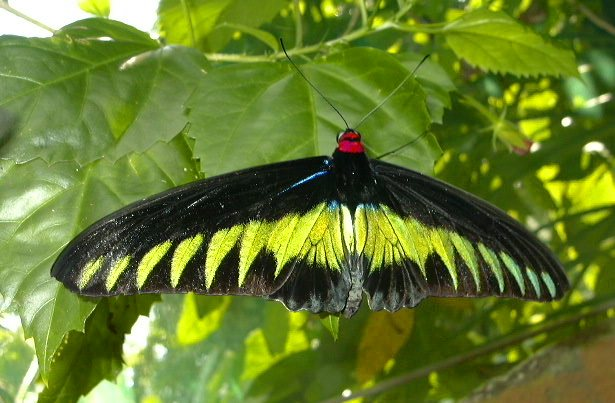
Black and yellow butterfly known as the "white rajah"

Fauna include mammals, reptiles, butterflies and insects and birds. The most popular, totally arboreal faunal species, is the Eastern grey gibbon which is grey in colour. Its habitat is mostly the forest canopy and is occasionally seen at mid-canopy level. Squirrels, in particular the tiny plain pygmy squirrel near human habitations, and black spotted rock frog (Staurois natator) are also reported from the park. Orchids and snakes, particularly the coloured Wagler's pit viper, reside on tree tops. Otters such as Smooth-coated otter can be seen on the Temburong River. Other notable discoveries of animals found on the park are the Belalong tree frog (Leptomantis belalongensis) and the earless monitor lizard (Lanthanotus borneensis).

There are four hundred species of butterfly, some quite rare, and the most famous is the Rajah Brooke's birdwing which is given the name "white rajah" honouring James Brooke. The area was under his private authority as part of Sarawak during the colonial era; the male species have jet black wing colour and emerald green banding. Another variety of butterfly is the tree nymph (Idea stolli), which is a white and black spotted species. Other species of insects found are centipedes, giant forest ant (Camponotus gigas), lantern bugs and termites.

=== Important Bird Area ===
A 70,000 ha tract of land, encompassing the park and extensions to the Batu Apoi Forest Reserve, has been identified by BirdLife International as an Important Bird Area (IBA) because its forest habitats support significant numbers of various threatened bird species, including Bornean crestless firebacks, large and cinnamon-headed green pigeons, lesser adjutants, Storm's storks, mountain serpent eagles, Wallace's hawk-eagles, Malay blue-banded kingfishers, blue-headed pittas, straw-headed bulbuls, chestnut-crested yuhinas, Bornean wren-babblers, grey-chested jungle flycatchers and large-billed blue-flycatchers.

The bushy-crested hornbill (Anorrhinus galeritus), rhinoceros hornbill (Buceros rhinoceros), black-and-yellow broadbill (Eurylaimus ochromalus), and swiftlets are notable birds in the park.

== Conservation ==
The park is under the control of the Forestry Department of the Ministry of Primary Resources and Tourism. Offices of the National Park Headquarters are located near the confluence of Sungei Belalong with Temburong river. A research station (Kuala Belalong Field Studies Centre) was established by Universiti Brunei Darussalam in 1990. It is located about 500m from the mouth of the Belalong River on the west bank. The research centre served as a key research, teaching and training site for international research community and universities. It is used for various environmental awareness programs that include the school environmental education program runs by Universiti Brunei Darussalam. The park is also part of the Heart of Borneo international conservation agreement.

== Accommodation ==
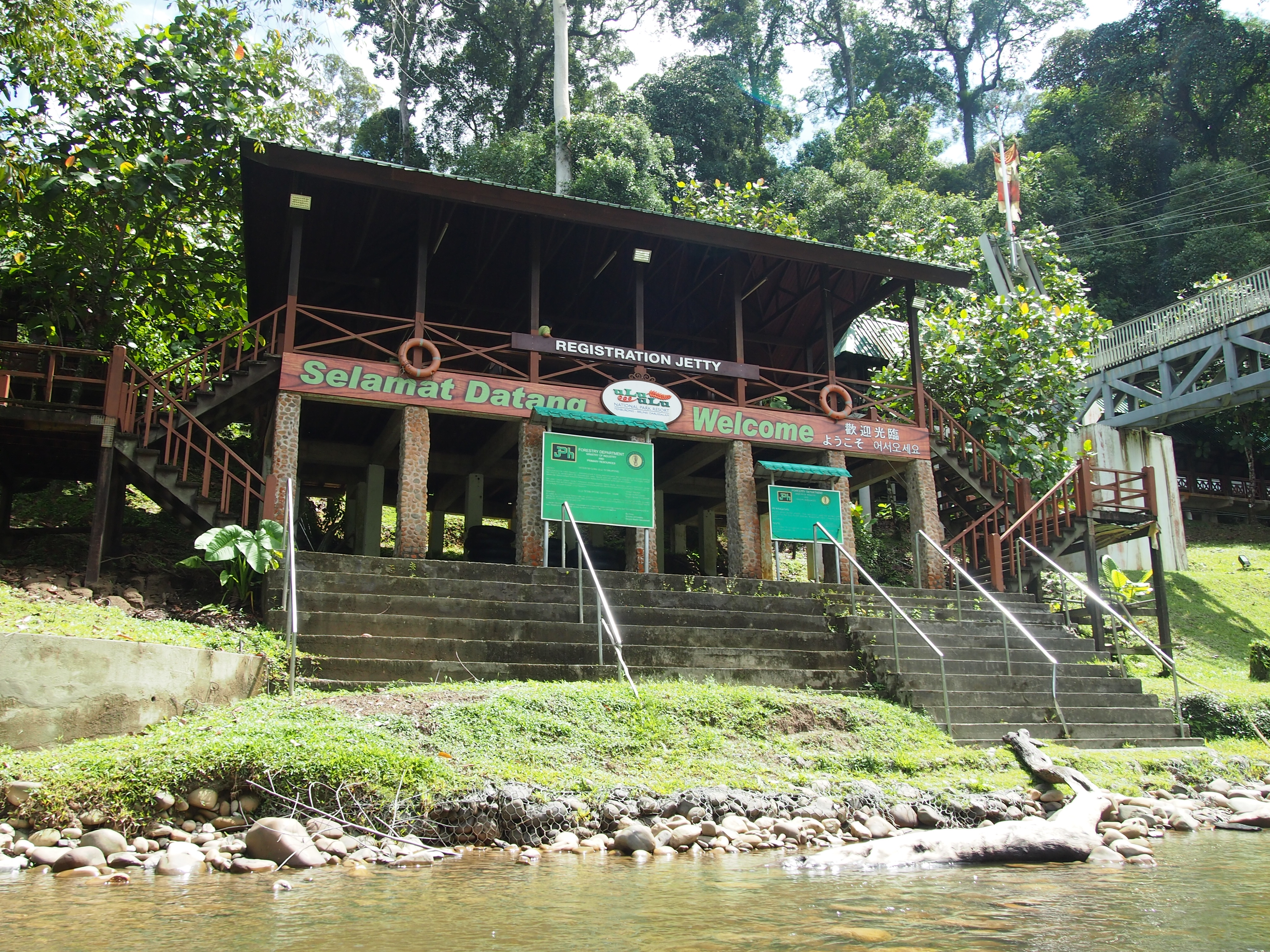
This is where incoming guests first register.

The only accommodation inside the National Park, Ulu Ulu Resort was opened in November 2008 with the privatization of the facilities in Ulu Temburong National Park under the authority of the Forestry Department. This is regarded as a historical milestone in Brunei tourism as this is the first Public-Private Partnership (PPP) between a private tour company (Sunshine Borneo Tours and Travel Sdn Bhd) and the Government of Brunei Darussalam.

The 17-room resort is a low-density and environment friendly accommodation. There are three room categories; Standard (dormitory), Superior (twin share and family suites) and Deluxe (double bed). The resort has a conference room, auditorium, restaurant, gift and souvenir shop and games room. To stay at the resort, visitors are required to make advance booking of a Ulu Temburong National Park tour package, to and from Bandar Seri Begawan.

The partnership was forced to suspend operation on 20 June 2020 due to the COVID-19 Pandemic despite aid from the Ministry of Finance & Economy's support.

== Bibliography ==
- WWF (2012). "The Environmental Status 2012 of the Heart of Borneo Text" (PDF). WWF.
