= Leptomantis gauni =

Conservation status
- Least Concern (IUCN 3.1)

Scientific classification
- Kingdom: Animalia
- Phylum: Chordata
- Class: Amphibia
- Order: Anura
- Family: Rhacophoridae
- Genus: Leptomantis
- Species: L. gauni

Binomial name
- Leptomantis gauni (Inger, 1966)

Synonyms
- Philautus gauni Inger, 1966; Rhacophorus gauni (Inger, 1966)

Species of frog

Leptomantis gauni is a species of frog in the family Rhacophoridae. It is endemic to Borneo and is found in Sabah and central Sarawak (Malaysia), Brunei, and north-eastern Kalimantan (Indonesia). The specific name gauni honours Gaun Sureng, a collector for the Sarawak Museum and a companion to Robert F. Inger on field trips when this species was observed. Common names short-nosed tree frog and Inger's flying frog have been coined for it.

== Description ==
Adult males measure 26–30 mm (1.0–1.2 in) and adult females 36–38 mm (1.4–1.5 in) in snout–vent length. The snout is broadly rounded and short. There is a small conical tubercle in middle of upper eyelid. The tympanum is distinct. The finger and the toe tips have well-developed discs. The fingers are partially webbed whereas the toes are almost fully webbed. The dorsal surfaces are light gray with faint, large, dark spots on the back, consisting of at least a dark interscapular spot. There is a characteristic cream-colored or white spot below the eye. The flanks and the ventrum are white. The legs have dark dorsal crossbars, and the anterior and posterior faces of thigh reddish orange. The iris is pale brown, without network.

== Habitat and conservation ==
Leptomantis gauni occurs in primary and old secondary lowland and hilly rainforests at elevations of 100–980 m (330–3,220 ft) above sea level. It lives in the vegetation overhanging small, clear, rocky streams. Foam nests are placed in branches overhanging these streams. The tadpoles live in riffles where they use their oral sucker to cling to rocks.

Leptomantis gauni can be locally abundant. The major threats to it are deforestation through clear-cutting and the resulting stream siltation. It is present in many protected areas.
