= Climate change in Brunei =

Effects of climate change and responses to it

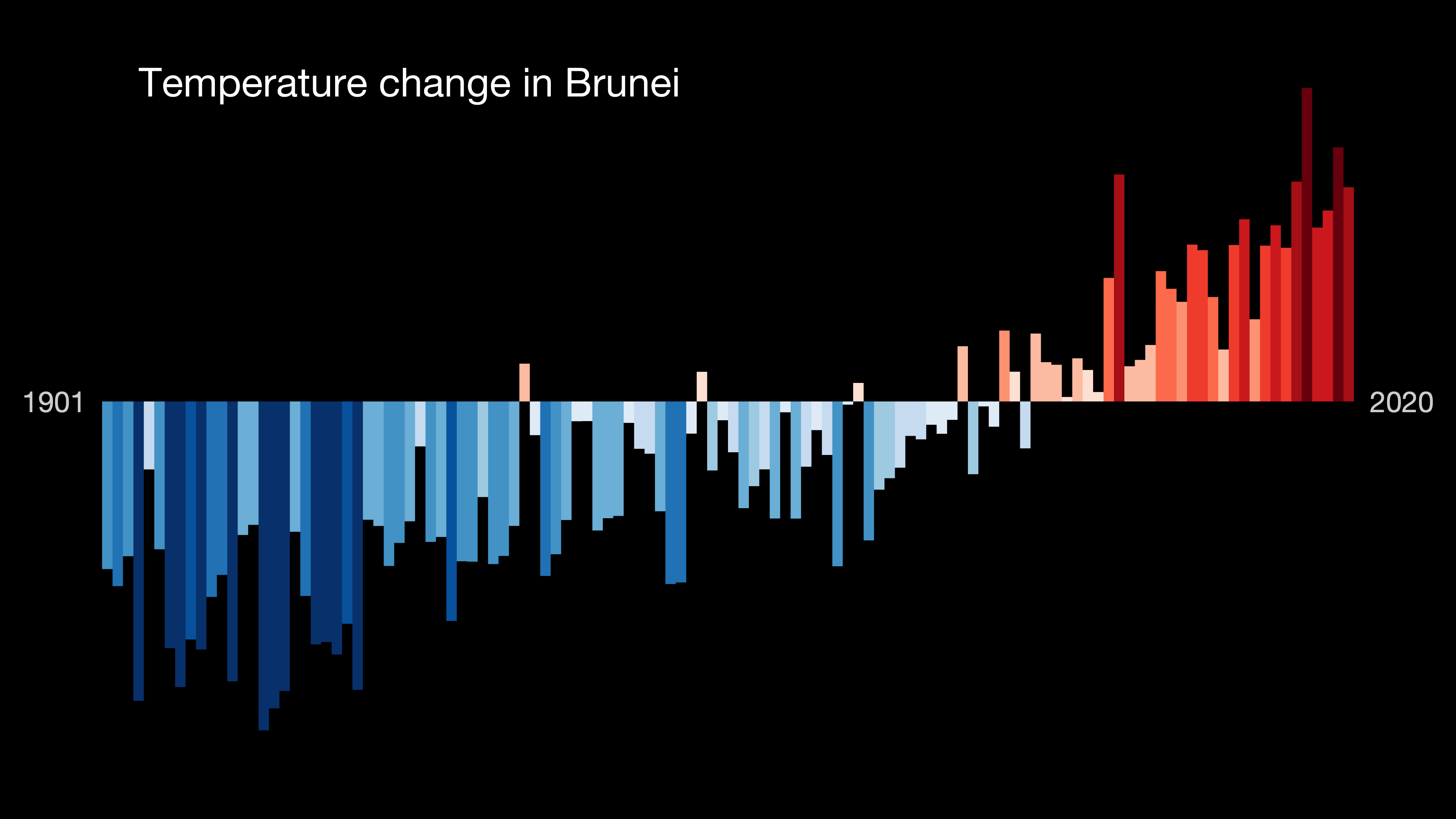
Graph showing temperature anomaly in Brunei between 1901 and 2021

Brunei is vulnerable to a number of environmental consequences brought on by climate change. The main dangers include loss of biodiversity, increasing sea levels, and air pollution in urban areas. Due to its low-lying topography and small population of 470,000, Brunei faces a serious sea level rise problem. Fossil fuels are also a key source of energy in Brunei and are an important export for the nation. Moreover, Brunei will lose more than two thirds of its growth in the gross domestic product (GDP) if the rest of the world switches away from fossil fuels, particularly crude oil.

== Emissions ==
The country contributed to just roughly 0.025% of the world's carbon emissions. In the last ten years since 2021, carbon dioxide emissions in the country have stayed around 17,000,000 tonnes (17,000,000 long tons; 19,000,000 short tons). In 2035, it is projected that the country would produce 30 million tonnes of CO_{2} under the status quo. The fact that it has around 16 tonnes of emissions per person whereas Malaysia, a neighbor, only has 4 tonnes, is equally alarming. However, Brunei has made significant progress in protecting its forests, with 44% of the nation's land area now being made up of protected forests, including two National Parks and 47 forest reserves and wildlife sanctuaries.

== Impacts ==
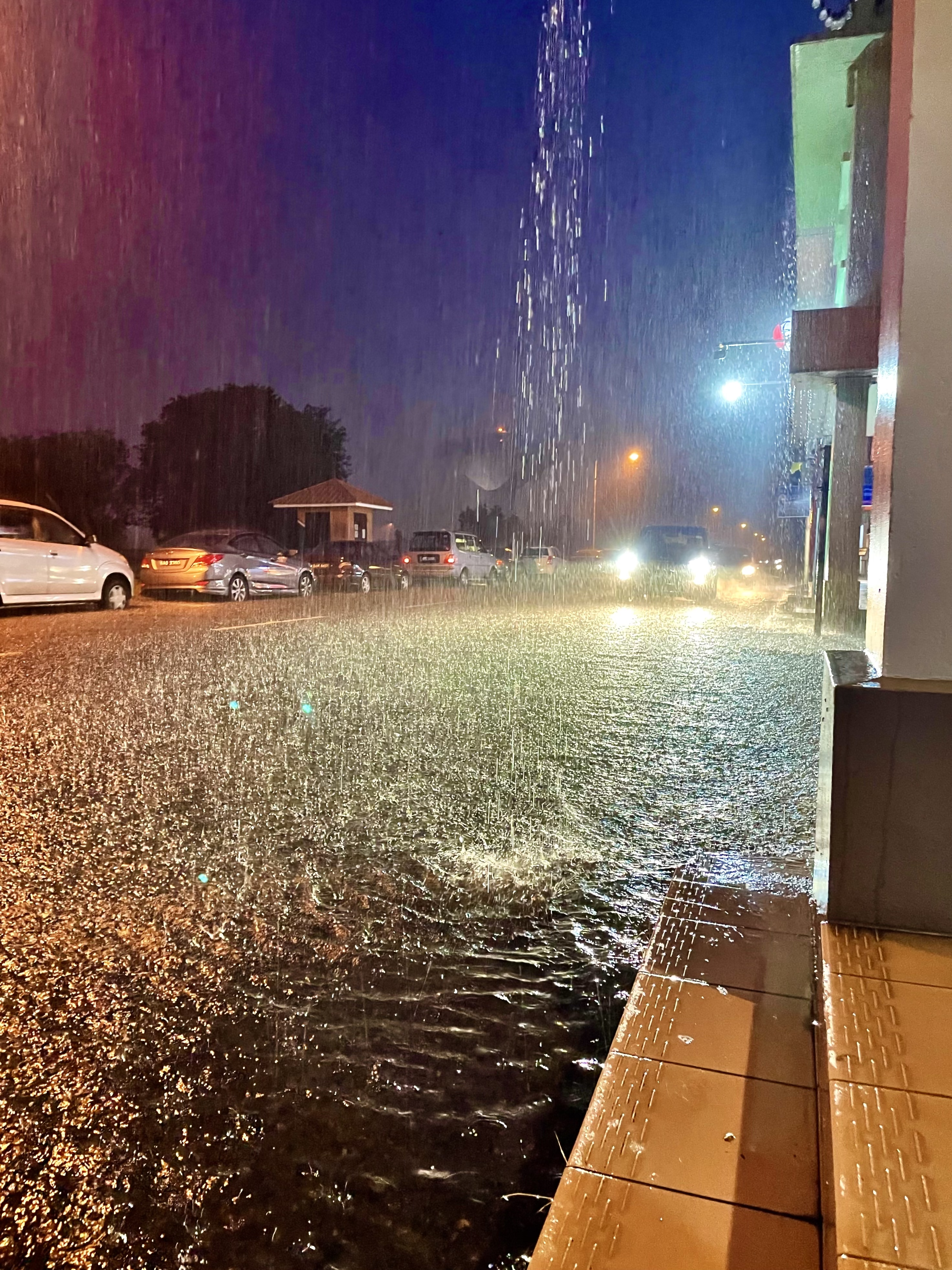
In 2021, flash floods are brought on by heavy rain in Seria

=== Temperature changes ===
The head of Brunei Climate Change Secretariat (BCCS) shared a statement from the World Meteorological Organization (WMO) that stated the years 2018, 2019, and 2020 were the three warmest years ever recorded. It is emphasized the need for transformational change in order to keep the increase in global temperature to 1.5 degrees Celsius, as well as the necessity for the world to achieve net zero emissions by the year 2050 and a 45% reduction in global greenhouse gas emissions by 2030. Even though the country may be one of the countries that contributes the least to global warming, it is nonetheless affected by landslides, floods, and forest fires.

The average temperature is increasing at a rate of 0.25 degrees Celsius every decade, according to the Brunei Darussalam Meteorological Department (BDMD). The 28 March 1983 saw Brunei's 38 degrees Celsius highest recorded maximum temperature. The country has seen a number of bush and forest fires during El-Nino occurrences, such as in the years 1997–1998 and 2015–2016, which results in extremely bad haze conditions.

=== Precipitation and flooding ===
In Brunei, floods happen during the rainy season (October to May), although typhoons are rarely a problem because the country is not in their path. There haven't been any significant flood catastrophes in recent years. However, limited flooding in the metropolitan area has been brought on by severe rains. The capital city of Bandar Seri Begawan suffered flood damage as a result of storm rains on 21 January 2009, and 15 January 2010. The International Disaster Database (EM-DAT) does not list these damages. Large-scale flood damage has not yet happened, despite the fact that storm rainfalls throughout the rainy season (October to May) typically generate floods. Transportation infrastructures are impacted by local inundation, and the majority of residential areas are situated on coastal plains where they are quickly swamped.

=== Sea level rise ===
The country is certainly susceptible to tidal erosion and floods because the bulk of its town lives close to the ocean. There is a potential that Brunei's water level will rise when there are high tides and rain at the same time. Flooding will result from this, especially in low-lying areas of the nation. According to study by the Sea Level Rise Task Force (SLRTF), the water level in Brunei has risen by around 5–5.5 millimetres (0.20–0.22 in) annually. Based on this, it is predicted that sea levels would rise by 0.44–0.45 metres (1 ft 5 in – 1 ft 6 in) by the year 2100.

=== Impacts on people ===
Under a high emissions scenario, it is anticipated that by 2080, there would be 51 heat-related fatalities per 100,000 people in Brunei, compared to the baseline estimate of zero deaths per 100,000 per year between 1961 and 1990. In 2080, heat-related fatalities among the elderly might be reduced to 7 deaths per 100,000 people if global emissions were rapidly reduced.

== Mitigation ==
When dealing with unfavorable changing climatic patterns, Brunei takes a whole-of-nation approach. It is dedicated to laying the groundwork for a sustainable nation via effective policies, careful planning, and administration. The ideas, beliefs, and tactics to lower carbon emissions, boost carbon sinks, and improve climate resilience nationally are supported by this Brunei Darussalam National Climate Change Policy.

== Adaptation ==
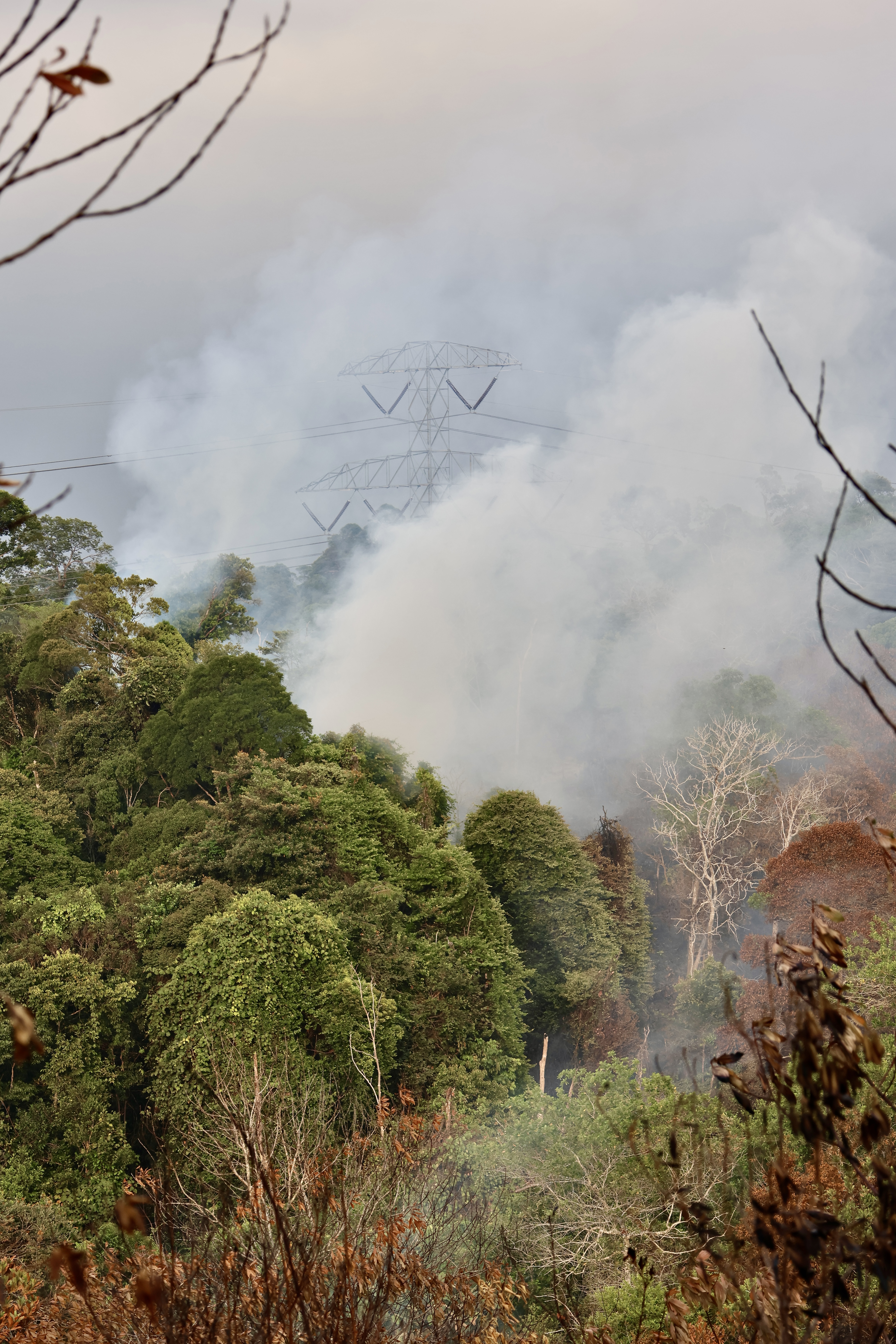
Wildfire taking place in Kampong Perumpong, 2024

According to a 2015 report, its adaptations are to conduct a nationwide evaluation of the effects of climate change, susceptibility, and health adaptability. To continue to expand initiatives to boost the health infrastructure's resistance to climate change beyond readiness for vector-borne diseases. To continue to establish cost estimates and allocations that go beyond vector surveillance and control to encompass all adaptation measures required to accomplish climate change-related health resilience.

=== Policies ===
The United Nations Framework Convention on Climate Change (UNFCCC) was approved by Brunei on 7 August 2007. The ratification becomes effective on 5 December 2007. On 20 August 2009, two years after it was signed, Brunei ratified the Kyoto Protocol. The Energy and Industry Department in the Prime Minister's Office is willing to offer its Initial National Communication (INC) to the Conference of the Parties in its position as the country's national focal point to the UNFCCC. The INC provides data on the country's efforts to mitigate and enable adaptation to climate change based on its national conditions and capacities, as well as a greenhouse gas inventory for the year 2010.

2020 saw the release of the Brunei Darussalam National Climate Change Policy (BNCCP), which included 10 major measures for a future that would be low-carbon and climate-resilient. The Permanent Secretary of Planning, Land Use and Environment stated that further efforts would be made on the year to counteract the current carbon sinks. In 2021, the BNCCC exceeded the 26,000-tree objective by planting 33,507 trees.

Wawasan Brunei 2035 is the name of Brunei's national vision, which describes the nation's social, economic, and environmental objectives. Protecting the population's health and wellbeing as well as the nation's natural resources is seen to require strengthening climate resilience, adaptation, and mitigation strategies. For additional climate change adaptation efforts, the government has designated six key sectors, including: Biodiversity, Forestry, Coastal and Flood Protection, Health, Agriculture, and Fisheries are the top priorities.

== See also ==
- Environmental issues in Brunei
- Transport in Brunei
- Climate change in Asia
- Wildlife of Brunei
