= Climate change in Asia =

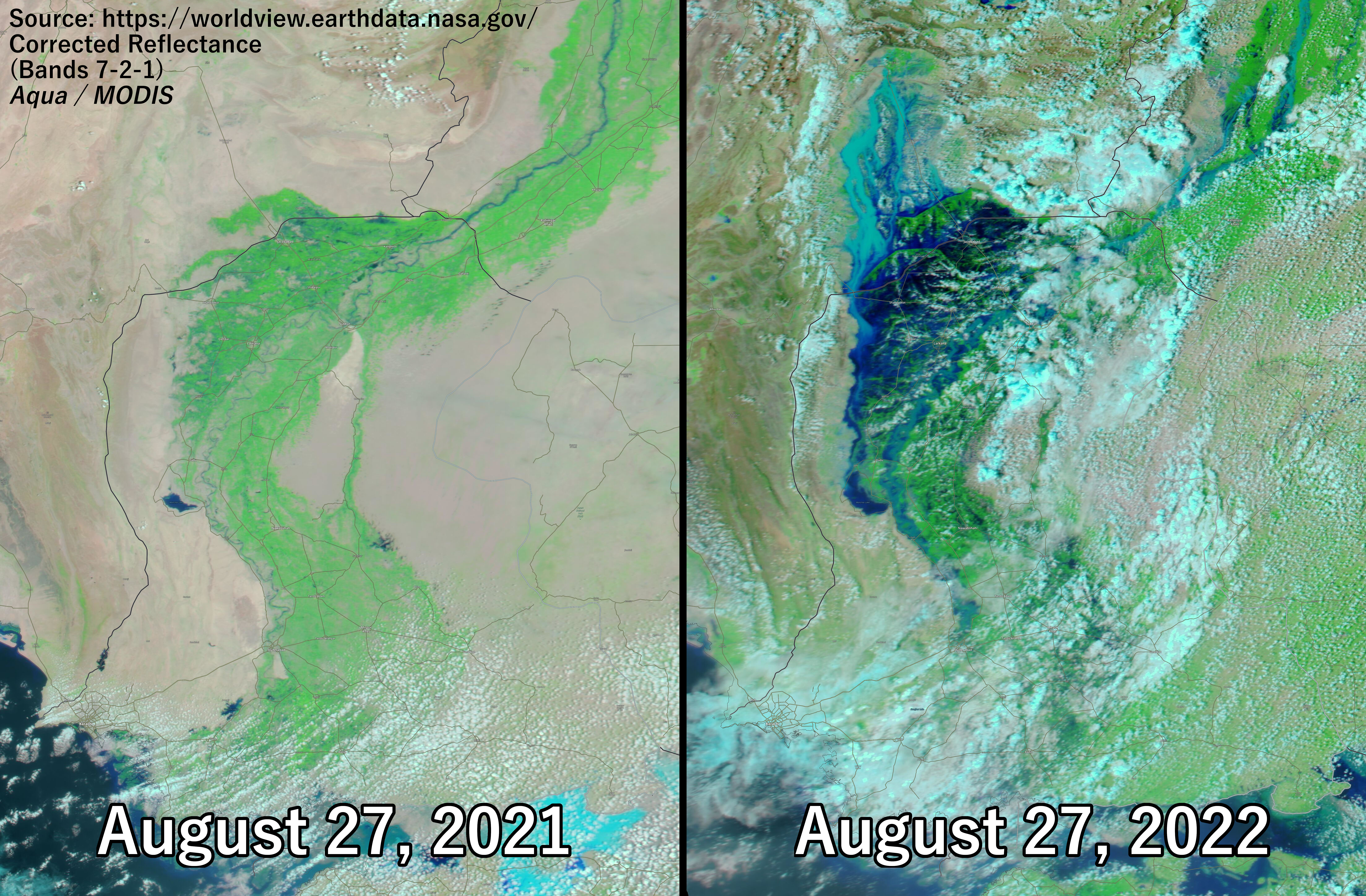
The 2022 South Asian floods, including in Pakistan (pictured), are an example of a climate change impact.

Climate change is particularly important in Asia, as the continent accounts for the majority of the human population. Warming since the 20th century is increasing the threat of heatwaves across the entire continent. Heatwaves lead to increased mortality, and the demand for air conditioning is rapidly accelerating as a result. By 2080, around 1 billion people in the cities of South and Southeast Asia are expected to experience around a month of extreme heat every year. The impacts on the water cycle are more complicated: already arid regions, primarily located in West Asia and Central Asia, will see more droughts, while areas of East, Southeast and South Asia which are already wet due to the monsoons will experience more flooding.

The waters around Asia are subjected to the same impacts as elsewhere, such as increased warming and ocean acidification. There are many coral reefs in the region, and they are highly vulnerable to climate change, to the point that practically all of them will be lost if the warming exceeds 1.5 °C (2.7 °F). Asia's distinctive mangrove ecosystems are also highly vulnerable to sea level rise. Asia also has more countries with large coastal populations than any other continent, which would cause large economic impacts from sea level rise. Water supplies in the Hindu Kush region will become more unstable as its enormous glaciers, known as the "Asian water towers", gradually melt. These changes to the water cycle also affect vector-borne disease distribution, with malaria and dengue fever expected to become more prominent in the tropical and subtropical regions. Food security will become more uneven, and South Asian countries could experience significant impacts from global food price volatility.

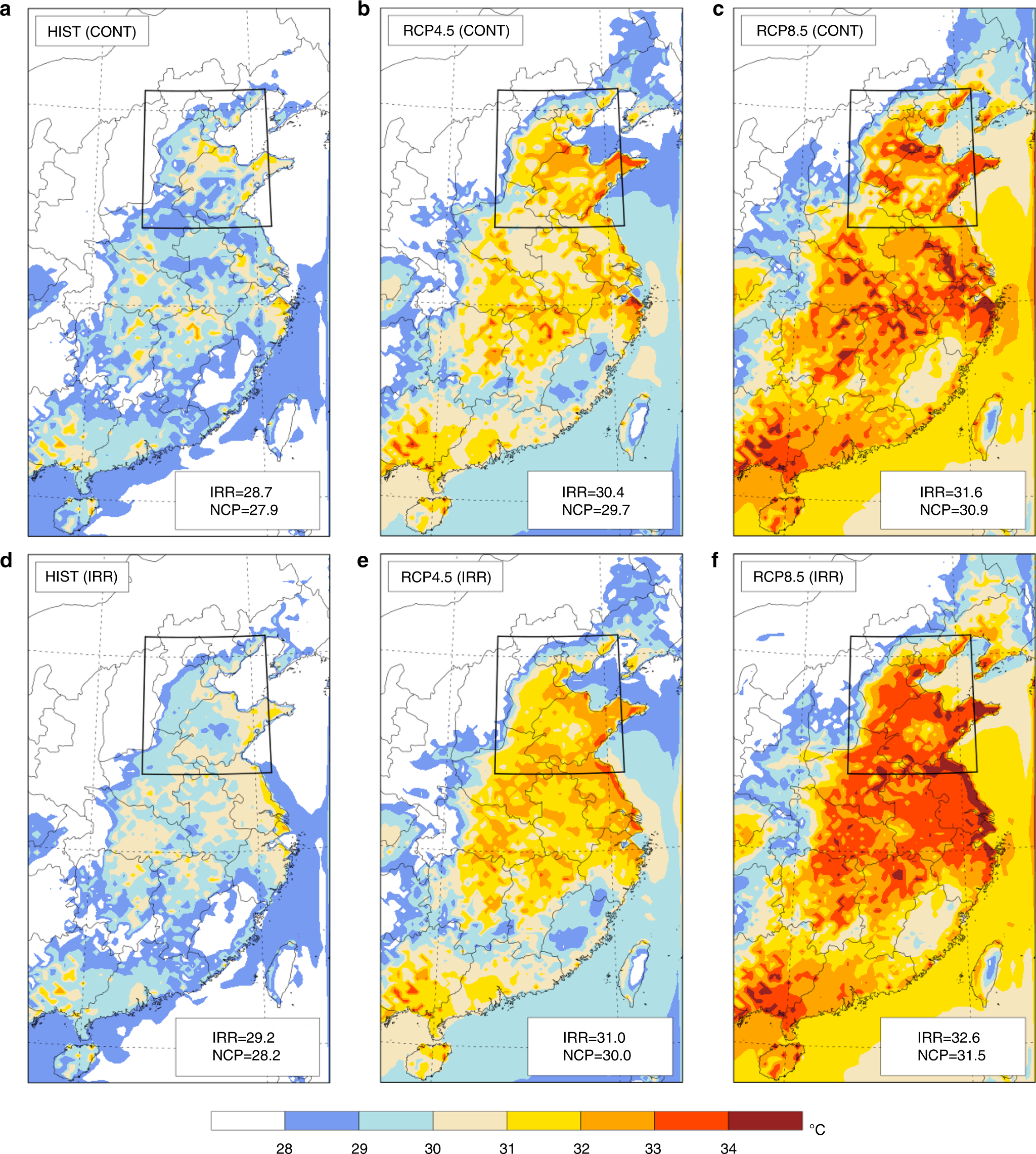
Climate change is expected to exacerbate heat stress over the North China Plain, which is particularly vulnerable as widespread irrigation results in very moist air. There is a risk that agricultural labourers will be physically unable to work outdoors on hot summer days at the end of the century, particularly under the scenario of greatest emissions and warming.

Historical emissions from Asia are lower than those from Europe and North America. However, China has been the single largest emitter of greenhouse gases in the 21st century, while India is the third-largest. As a whole, Asia currently accounts for 36% of the world's primary energy consumption, which is expected to increase to 48% by 2050. By 2040, it is also expected to account for 80% of the world's coal and 26% of the world's natural gas consumption. While the United States remains the world's largest oil consumer, by 2050 it is projected to move to third place, behind China and India. While nearly half of the world's new renewable energy capacity is built in Asia, this is not yet sufficient in order to meet the goals of the Paris Agreement. They imply that the renewables would account for 35% of total energy consumption in Asia by 2030.

Climate change adaptation is already a reality for many Asian countries, with a wide range of strategies attempted across the continent. Important examples include the growing implementation of climate-smart agriculture in certain countries or the "sponge city" planning principles in China. While some countries have drawn up extensive frameworks such as the Bangladesh Delta Plan or Japan's Climate Adaptation Act, others still rely on localized actions that are not effectively scaled up.

== Greenhouse gas emissions ==
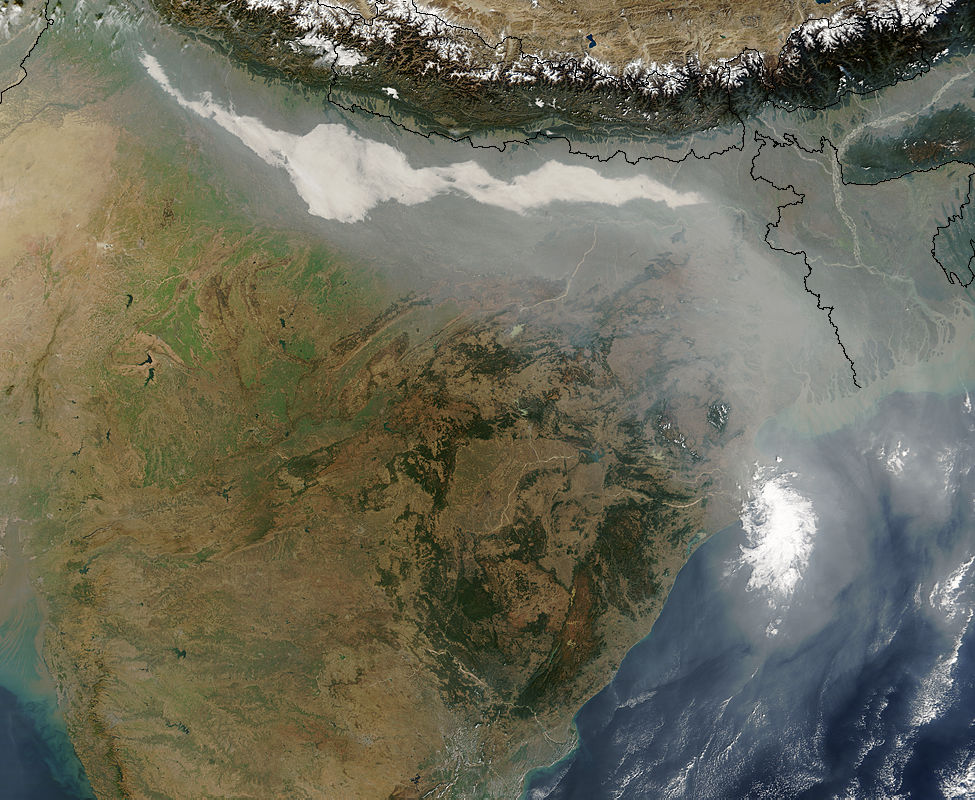
Thick haze and smoke along the Ganges River in northern India

Historical emissions from Asia are lower than those from Europe and North America. However, China has been the single largest emitter of greenhouse gases in the 21st century, while India is the 3rd-largest, Russia is 4th, while Japan and South Korea rank 5th and 7th. Around 70% of India's energy comes from fossil fuels, while this figure reaches 80-90% in China, Japan and the Republic of Korea. As a whole, Asia currently accounts for 36% of world's primary energy consumption, which is expected to increase to 48% by 2050. By 2040, it is also expected to account for 80% of the world's coal and 26% of the world's natural gas consumption. While the United States remains the world's largest oil consumer, by 2050 it is projected to move to third place, behind China and India.

After 2040, Asia would likely account for over half of the world's electricity consumption, and around 40% will likely be generated from coal burning. Asia is expected to import more oil and gas in the future than it does now, and would likely account for 80% of the global energy market in 2050. In particular, there are 11 developing countries in Asia which have a large energy consumption yet also lack energy security.

== Impacts ==
=== Warming ===
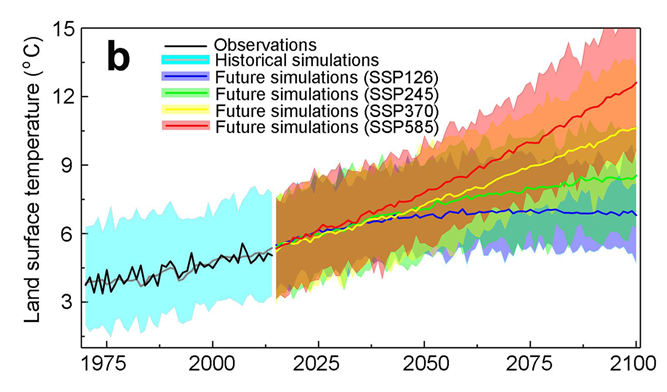
By 1975, land temperatures across Asia have already increased since the preindustrial period. Under the low-emission scenario, they will remain similar to present, but will increase substantially with greater emissions.

Köppen climate classification map for Central Asia for 1980–2016

2071–2100 map under the worst climate change scenario. Mid-range scenarios are currently considered more likely.

Starting from the 20th century, there has been clear warming across the entire continent. The frequency of cold days and nights decreased, which had also lowered the need for heating. Yet, the demand for air conditioning had increased far more as the frequency of hot days and warm nights had also grown, which had also increased the strain on power grids. Hot temperature extremes appear to have increased the most in Central and West Asia, while heatwaves in East and South Asia are becoming longer, more frequent and more severe.

In 2016 and 2018, Asia has already experienced extreme heat that would have been statistically impossible without climate change. New Delhi broke an all-time record when it reached 48 °C (118 °F) in 2018. North Asia has the coldest climate due to its proximity to the Arctic, but it also experiences greater relative warming due to what is known as the arctic amplification. This has led to permafrost thaw, which acts as a climate change feedback and also places large quantities of infrastructure at risk of collapse.

All of these trends are expected to continue in the future. There will be greater frequency of extreme heatwaves across the continent and heat stress would become more persistent across South Asia. Under the mid-range climate change scenario, parts of West and South Asia would reach "critical health thresholds" for heat stress during the 21st century, and this would also occur in parts of East Asia under the high-emission scenario. Growing urbanization in Asia would also subject more people to the urban heat island effect: for instance, Hyderabad will likely be the hottest city in the world at the end of the century, with an average annual temperature around 30 °C (86 °F). Yet, many rural people are agricultural workers, who are some of the most vulnerable to increasing heat. The demand for air conditioning would continue to increase and managing it would become more challenging for the energy infrastructures, which are often already prone to blackouts in many countries on the continent. In the Southeast Asia, heat-related deaths under a high-warming scenario could increase by 12.7% by 2100.

=== Water availability ===
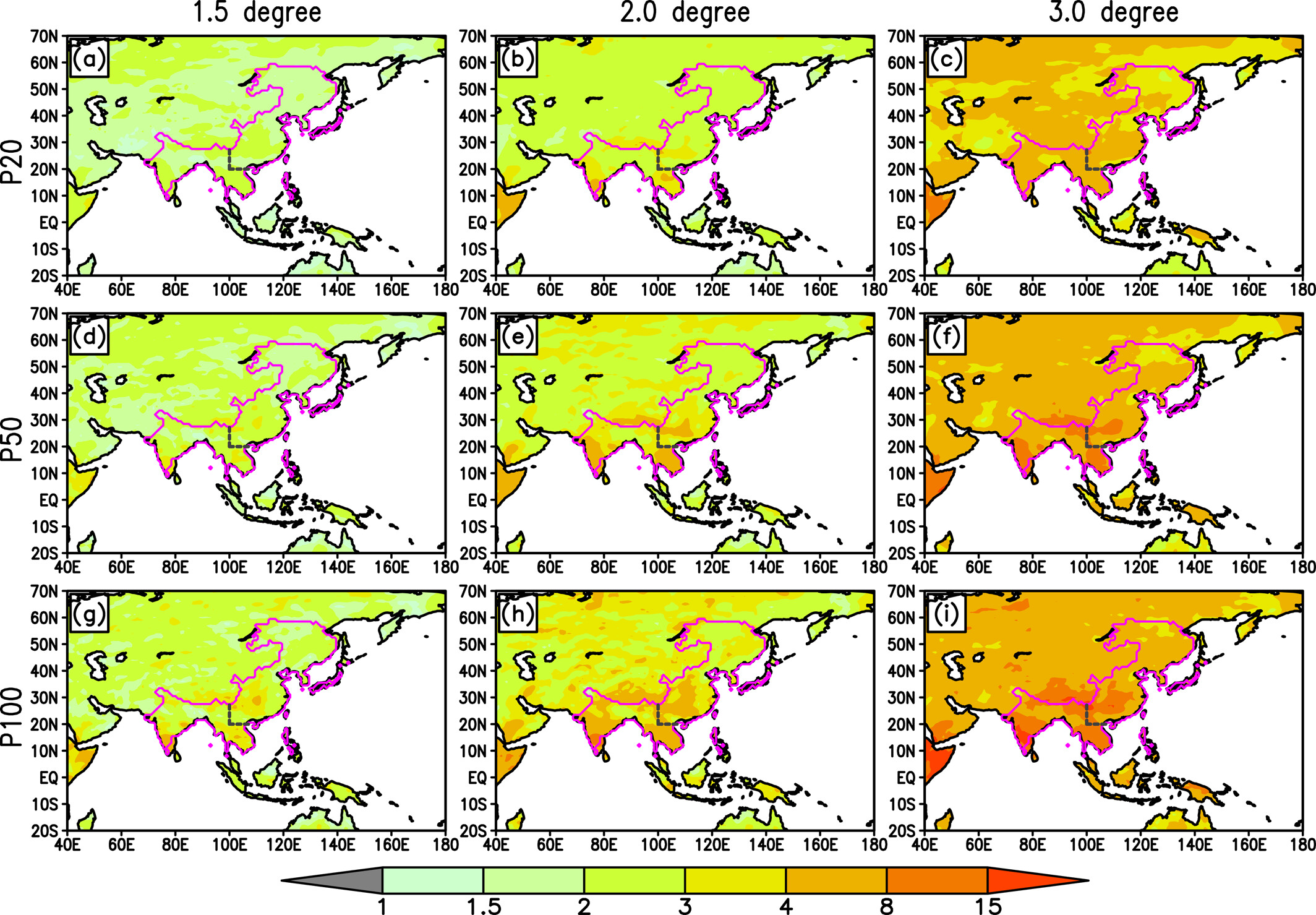
Greater warming increases the amount of moisture in the atmosphere over Asia, which directly leads to extreme precipitation. Probability of 20-year, 50-year and 100-year extremes consistently increases with warming across Asia - up to a 7-fold average increase for 100-year extremes under 3 °C (5.4 °F) of warming.

Precipitation trends are more complex than temperature trends. While climate change is generally expected to increase precipitation due to greater evaporation from the oceans, the large increase in anthropogenic sulfate aerosols during most of the 20th century (sometimes described as global dimming) has had an opposite impact, as sulfates cause clouds to retain water for longer before rainfall occurs. Rainfall associated with the Monsoon of South Asia and East Asian Monsoon had decreased by the end of the 20th century, and this is likely associated with aerosol pollution: there is already evidence of monsoon recovery when the aerosol concentrations decline. Because some clouds from South and East Asia go on to Central Asia, they could increase rainfall there with the same moisture they did not shed during the monsoon, and some evidence supports that.

However, this effect isn't very strong, as the overall rainfall in West and Central Asia had decreased, while drought likelihood had increased. The frequency and intensity of dust storms had increased in this region as well, although this is partly caused by poor land use practices. At the same time, heavy precipitation events (defined as 400 mm or more in a day) had increased in South, Southeast and East Asia during the 21st century. Over a third of the cities in Asia, with a combined population of around 932 million, are considered at high risk of flooding.

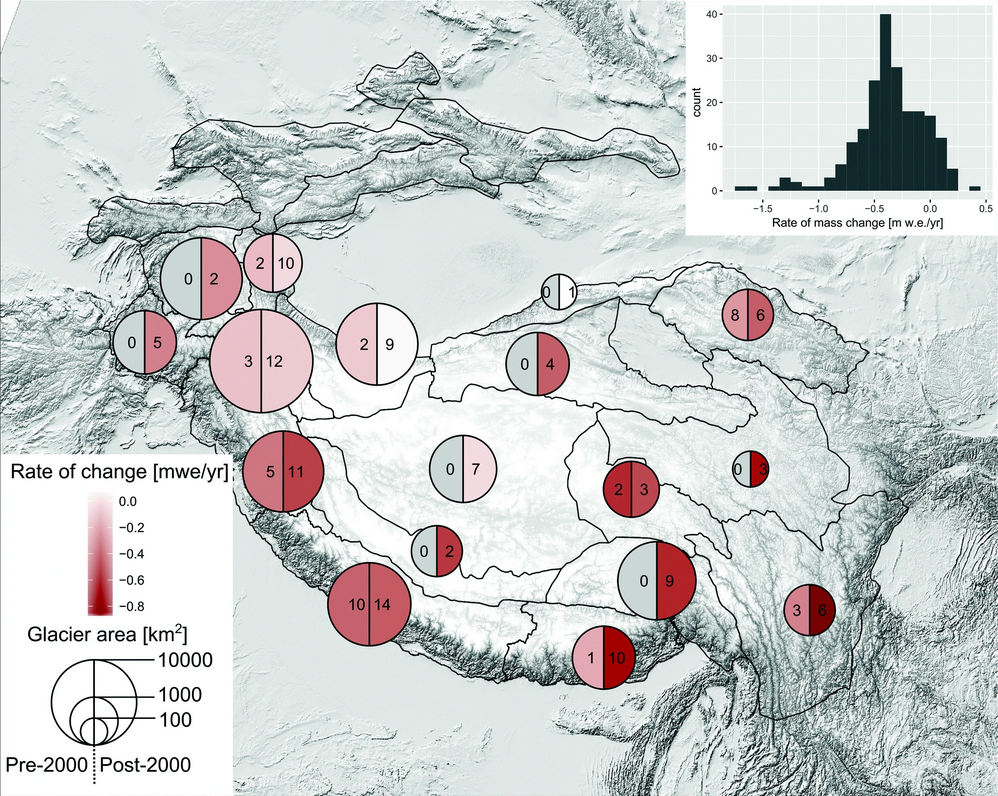
Observed glacier mass loss in the Hindu Kush Himalayas region since the 20th century

Future warming is expected to substantially increase annual precipitation across most of the continent. Monsoon regions would experience more heavy and even intense precipitation (defined as 50mm or more in an hour), making floods substantially more frequent. 100-year extremes in vapor transport (directly related to extreme precipitation) would become 2.6 times more frequent under 1.5 °C (2.7 °F) of global warming, yet 3.9 and 7.5 times more frequent under 2 °C (3.6 °F) and 3 °C (5.4 °F). While there has been no significant change in tropical cyclone (TC) frequency in Asia since the 1950s, category 4-5 TCs are likely to become more frequent under high warming and generate more rainfall.

On the contrary, drought frequency is expected to increase in the West and Central Asia. Even in the regions where precipitation increases, plants' water losses to evapotranspiration may increase even more, which could still increase the overall agricultural drought frequency. Across the continent, drought conditions would on average increase by between 5% to 20% by 2100. Around 2050, populations living in the Amu Darya, Ganges and Indus may be faced with severe water scarcity due to both climate and socioeconomic reasons.

Glaciers in the Hindu Kush region feed the water basin of over 220 million people. In the Indus River basin alone, they contribute to up to 60% of irrigation outside of the monsoon season. These glaciers have already experienced melting in the 21st century, and it would continue in the future, as up to two-thirds of glacier ice may melt by 2100 under high warming. While glacier water supply would likely increase until 2050, it would be permanently diminished afterwards. Although the increases in monsoon strength may offset these losses, agriculture in the region would still become more reliant on it than ever before, while hydropower generation would become less predictable and reliable.

=== Sea level rise ===
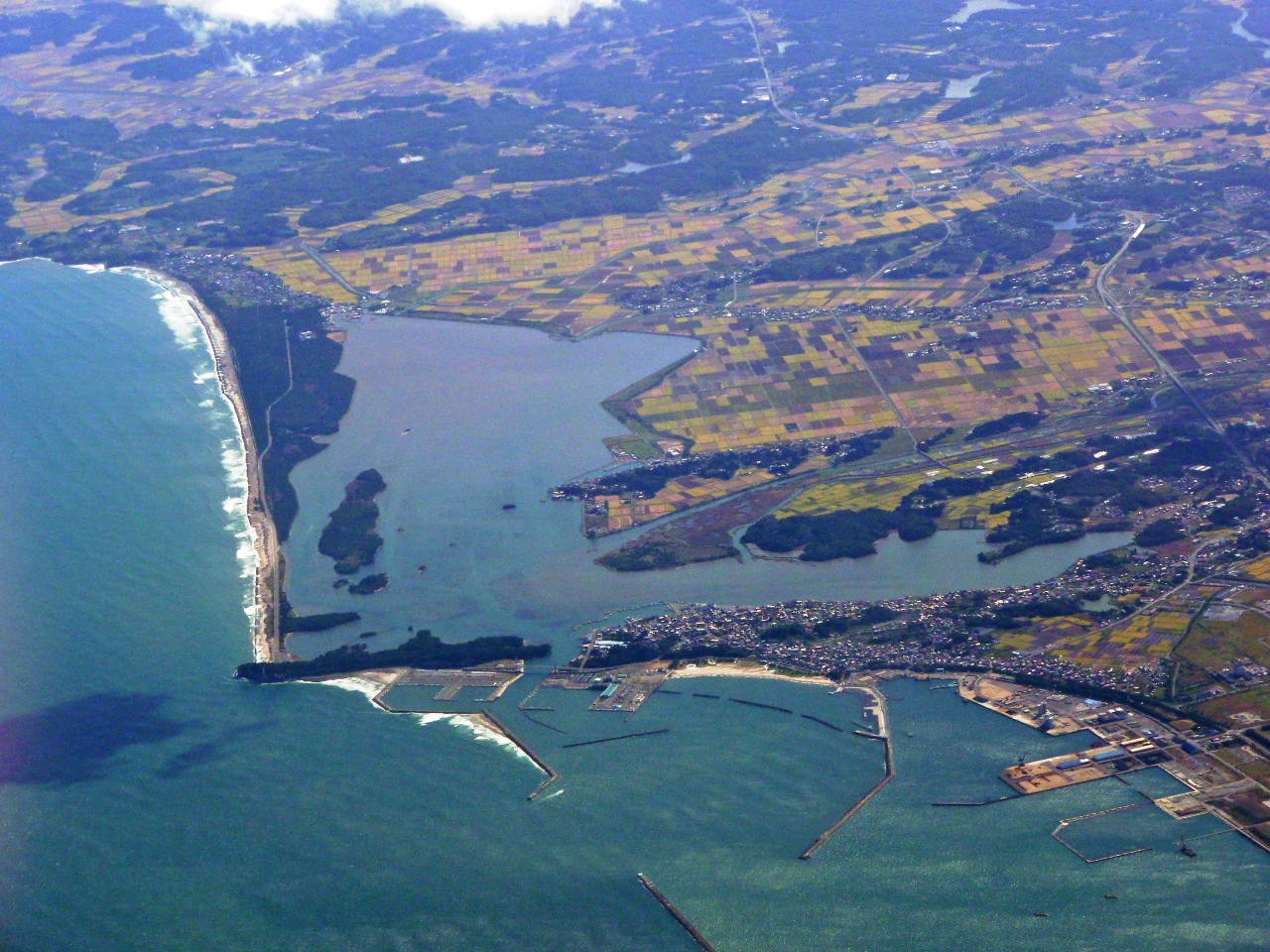
Matsukawaura Lagoon, located in Fukushima Prefecture of Honshu Island

Between 1901 and 2018, average global sea level rose by 15–25 cm (6–10 in), an average of 1–2 mm (0.039–0.079 in) per year. This rate accelerated to 4.62 mm (0.182 in)/yr for the decade 2013–2022. While the rate of sea level rise in Asia is usually similar to the global average, it has been around 10% faster in the Indo-Pacific region since the 1990s. Future sea level rise on Japan's Honshu Island would be up to 25 cm faster than the global average under RCP8.5, the intense climate change scenario.

Asia has the largest population at risk from sea level. As of 2022, some 63 million people in East and South Asia were already at risk from a 100-year flood. This is largely due to inadequate coastal protection in many countries. This will get much worse in the future. Bangladesh, China, India, Indonesia, Japan, Pakistan, the Philippines, Thailand and Vietnam alone account for 70% of people exposed to sea level rise during the 21st century. This is due to the dense population on the region's coasts. 2019 research indicated that globally, 150 million will be under the water line during high tide and 300 million will live in zones with flooding every year. By the year 2100, those numbers differ sharply depending on the emission scenario. In a low emission scenario, 140 million will be under water during high tide and 280 million will have flooding each year. In high emission scenario, the numbers reach up to 540 million and 640 million, respectively. Large parts of Ho Chi Minh City, Mumbai, Shanghai, Bangkok and Basra could be inundated. These figures are, on average, triple that of past estimates, and the increases are even larger for certain Asian countries.

| Country | Old estimate | New estimate |
|---|---|---|
| China | 29 | 93 |
| Bangladesh | 5 | 42 |
| India | 5 | 36 |
| Vietnam | 9 | 31 |
| Indonesia | 5 | 23 |
| Thailand | 1 | 12 |

Modeling results predict that Asia will suffer direct economic damages of US$167.6 billion at 0.47 meters of sea level rise. This rises to US$272.3 billion at 1.12 meters and US$338.1 billion at 1.75 meters. There is an additional indirect impact of US$8.5, 24 or 15 billion from population displacement at those levels. China, India, the Republic of Korea, Japan, Indonesia and Russia experience the largest economic losses. Nations like Bangladesh, Vietnam and China with extensive rice production on the coast are already seeing adverse impacts from saltwater intrusion. High-emission RCP8.5 scenario would see the loss of at least one third of Japanese beaches and 57–72% of Thai beaches.

Sea level rise in Bangladesh may force the relocation of up to one third of power plants by 2030. A similar proportion would have to deal with increased salinity of their cooling water. Recent search indicates that by 2050 sea-level rise will displace 0.9-2.1 million people. This would require the creation of about 594,000 new jobs and 197,000 housing units in the areas receiving the displaced persons. It would also be necessary to supply an additional 783 billion calories worth of food. Another paper in 2021 estimated that sea-level rise would displace 816,000 people by 2050. This would increase to 1.3 million when indirect effects are taken into account. Both studies assume that most displaced people would travel to the other areas of Bangladesh. They try to estimate population changes in different places.

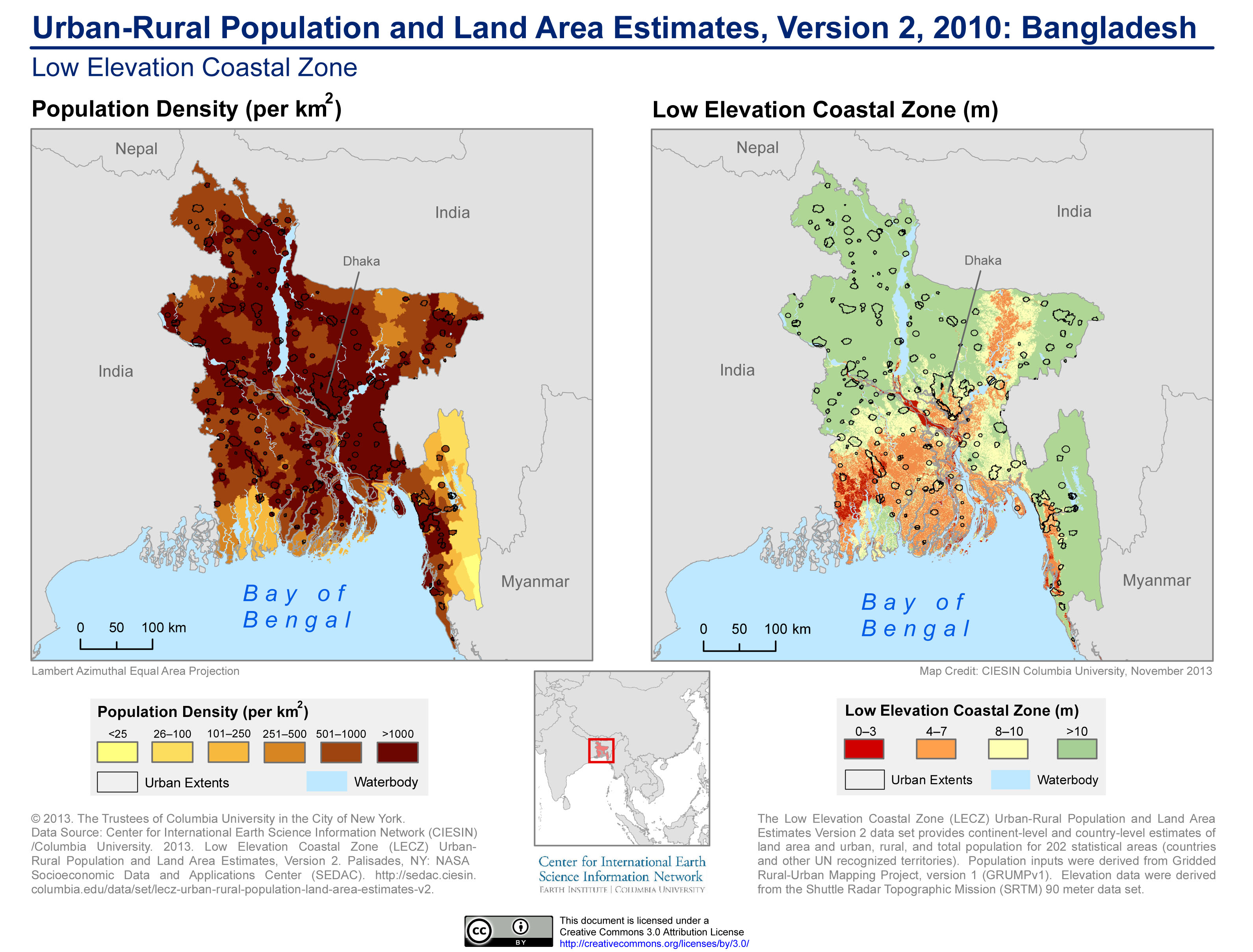
2010 estimates of population exposure to sea level rise in Bangladesh

Net Variations in the Population Due to Sea Level Rise in 2050 in Selected Districts.
| District | Net flux (Davis et al., 2018) | Net flux (De Lellis et al., 2021) | Rank (Davis et al., 2018) (Note: Refers to the magnitude of population change relative to the other districts.) | Rank (De Lellis et al., 2021) |
|---|---|---|---|---|
| Dhaka | 207,373 | −34, 060 | 1 | 11 |
| Narayanganj | −95,003 | −126,694 | 2 | 1 |
| Shariatpur | −80,916 | −124,444 | 3 | 3 |
| Barisal | −80,669 | −64,252 | 4 | 6 |
| Munshiganj | −77,916 | −124,598 | 5 | 2 |
| Madaripur | 61,791 | −937 | 6 | 60 |
| Chandpur | −37,711 | −70,998 | 7 | 4 |
| Jhalakati | 35,546 | 9,198 | 8 | 36 |
| Satkhira | −32,287 | −19,603 | 9 | 23 |
| Khulna | −28,148 | −9,982 | 10 | 33 |
| Cox's Bazar | −25,680 | −16,366 | 11 | 24 |
| Bagherat | 24,860 | 12,263 | 12 | 28 |

By 2030, major Indian cities such as Mumbai, Kolkata, Cuttack and Kochi are expected to end up with much of their territory below the tide level. In Mumbai alone, failing to adapt to this would result in damages of US$112–162 billion by 2050, which would nearly triple by 2070. Thus, the authorities are carrying out adaptation projects like the Mumbai Coastal Road, even at the likely expense of local coastal ecosystems and fishing livelihoods. Out of the 20 coastal cities expected to see the highest flood losses by 2050, 13 are in Asia. Nine of these are the so-called sinking cities, where subsidence (typically caused by unsustainable groundwater extraction in the past) would compound sea level rise. These are Bangkok, Guangzhou, Ho Chi Minh City, Jakarta, Kolkata, Nagoya, Tianjin, Xiamen and Zhanjiang.

By 2050, Guangzhou would see 0.2 meters of sea level rise and estimated annual economic losses of US$254 million – the highest in the world. One estimate calculates that in the absence of adaptation, cumulative economic losses caused by sea level rise in Guangzhou under RCP8.5 would reach about US$331 billion by 2050, US$660 billion by 2070 and US$1.4 trillion by 2100. The impact of high-end ice sheet instability would increase these figures to about US$420 billion, US$840 billion and US$1.8 trillion respectively. In Shanghai, coastal inundation amounts to about 0.03% of local GDP. But this would increase to 0.8% by 2100 even under the "moderate" RCP4.5 scenario in the absence of adaptation. The city of Jakarta is sinking so much (up to 28 cm (11 in) per year between 1982 and 2010 in some areas) that in 2019, the government had committed to relocate the capital of Indonesia to another city.

=== Natural environment ===
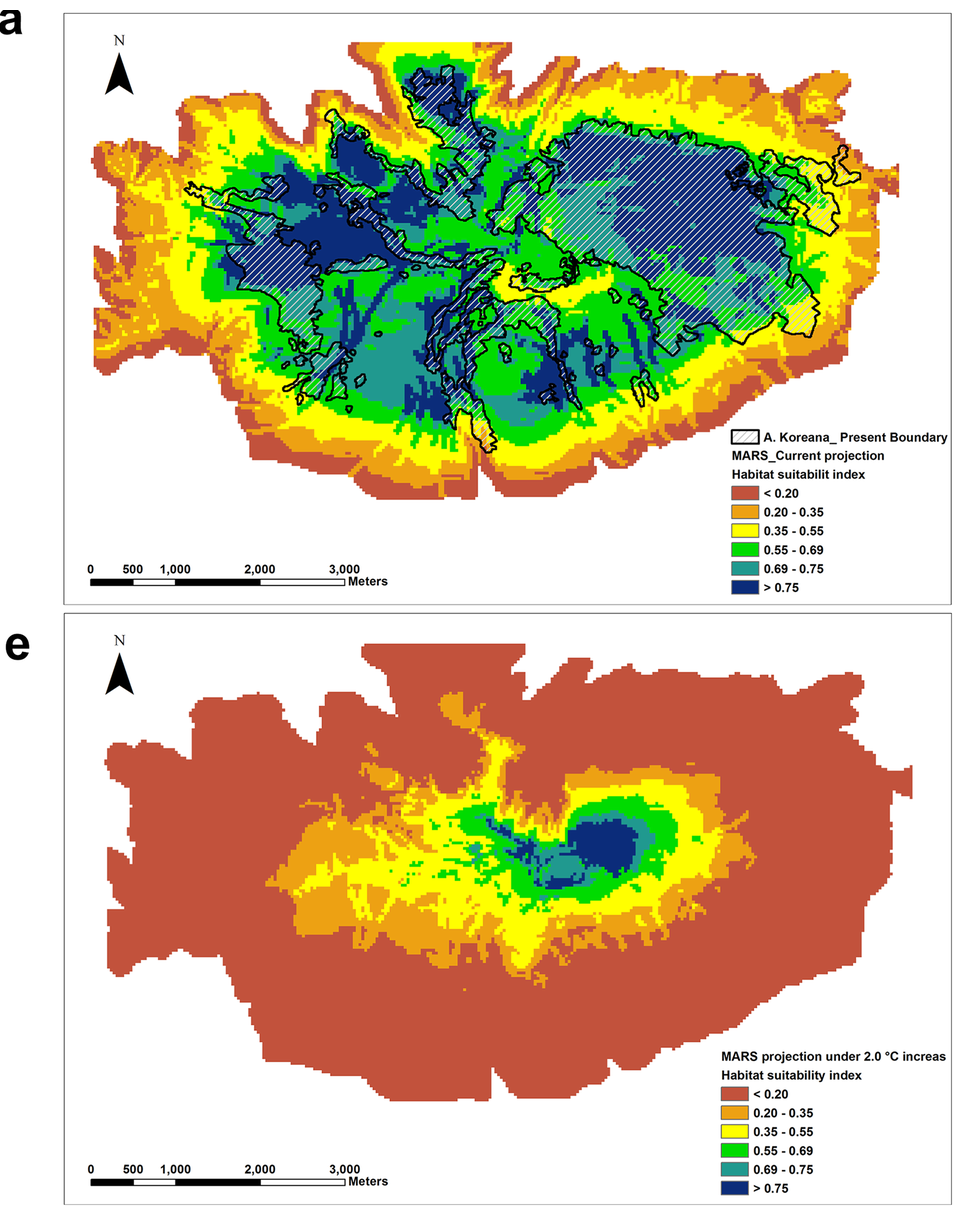
The distribution of the Korean fir in its core habitat, Mount Hallasan, will decline under the 2 °C (3.6 °F) local warming relative to the present.

Multiple biomes in Asia have already experienced visible shifts in response to climate change. These include changes in growing season length, habitat losses (particularly of the amphibian species) or greater invasive species frequency. Many animal species have been observed to move into warming areas to the north. In Siberia, tundra extent shrinks as it is gradually replaced by boreal forest (taiga). At the same time, wildfires have also become more severe in Siberia, although this is partly connected to increased pressure from mineral exploration and illegal logging. Greater warming has also generally made it easier for trees to move into the previously unsuitable mountain areas, and this trend is expected to continue in the future. This could also result in existing mountain ecosystems, such as the Korean fir forests, getting replaced by more temperate ones.

Some freshwater fish species will lose parts of their range. Many marine and coastal ecosystems at risk of irreversible loss after just of warming. Notable examples include coastal seagrass meadows, which are deteriorating at the rate of 7%/year, and the mangrove forests, 42% of which are in Asia. By 2018, over 60% of Asia's past mangrove extent and 40% of coral reefs had already been lost. At the same tide, "golden tide" blooms of Sargassum horneri might become more frequent.

In the South China Sea alone, there are nearly 600 coral species, and they have been severely impacted by climate change and other human activities. In general, the remaining coral reefs will experience irreversible losses soon after 1.5 °C (2.7 °F) of warming. That Coral Triangle is considered one of the 12 "priority" ecosystems in Asia, and research shows that they could lose up to 26% of their species under 2 °C (3.6 °F), and up to 56% under 4.5 °C (8.1 °F) warming.

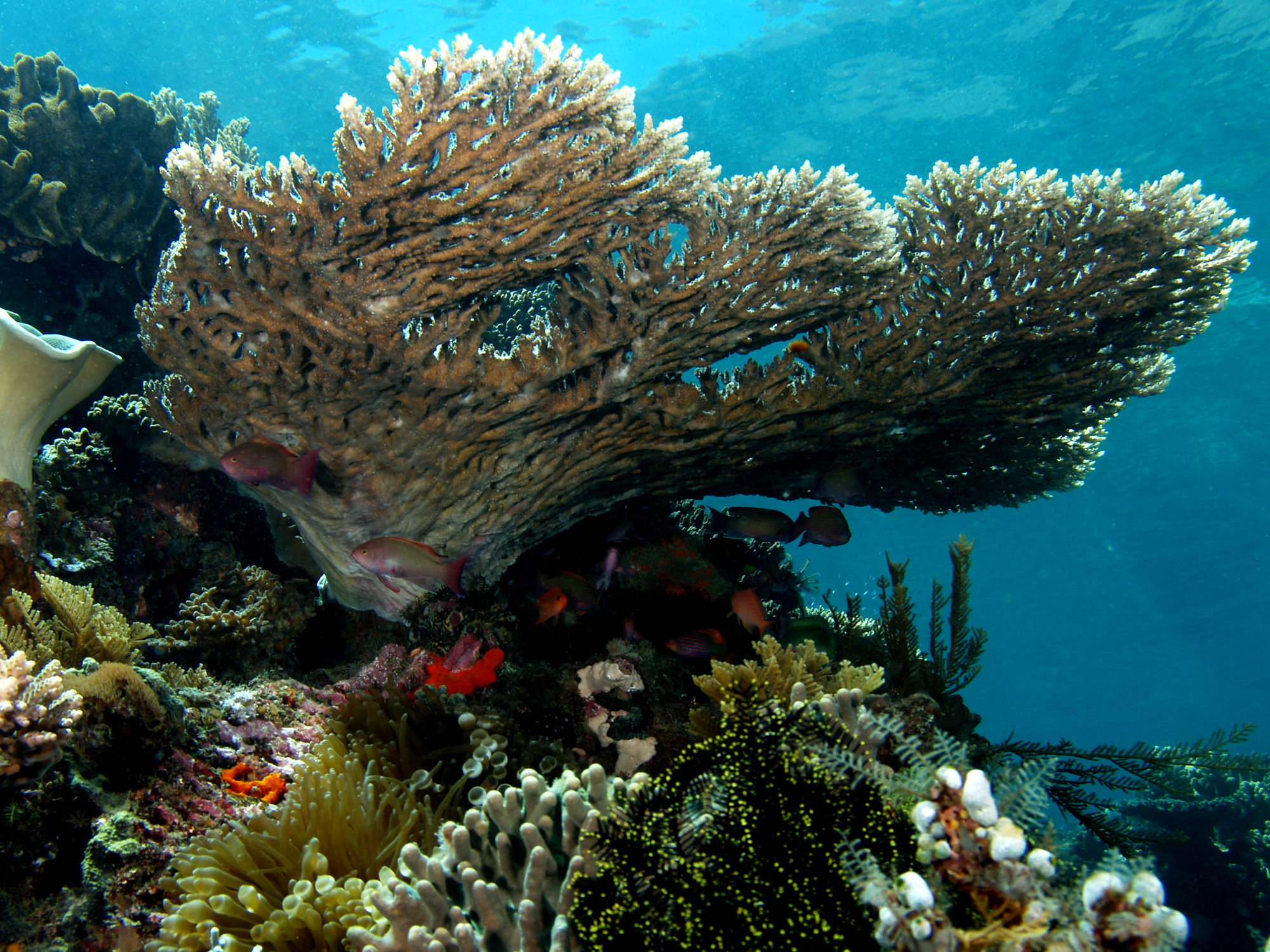
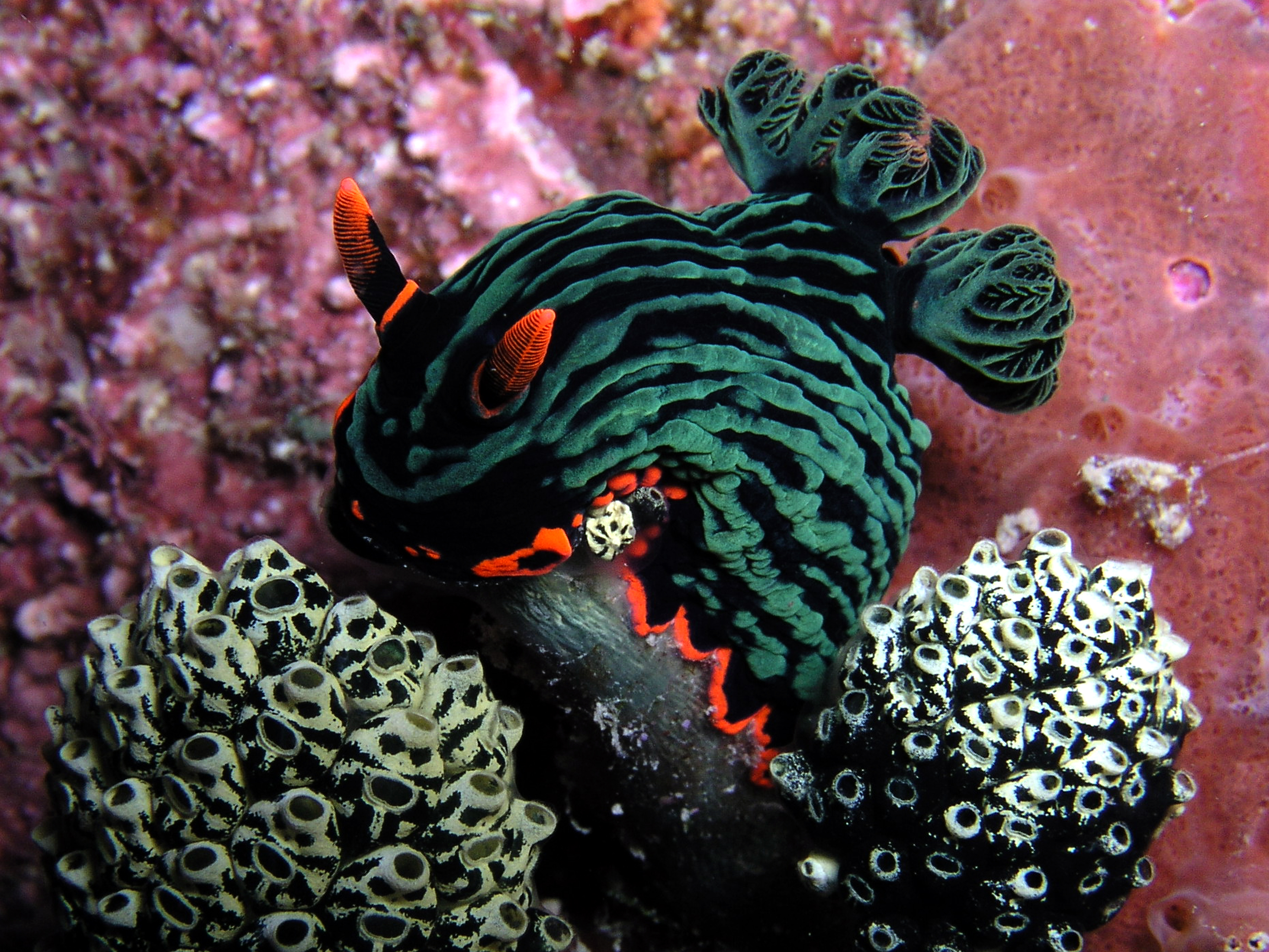
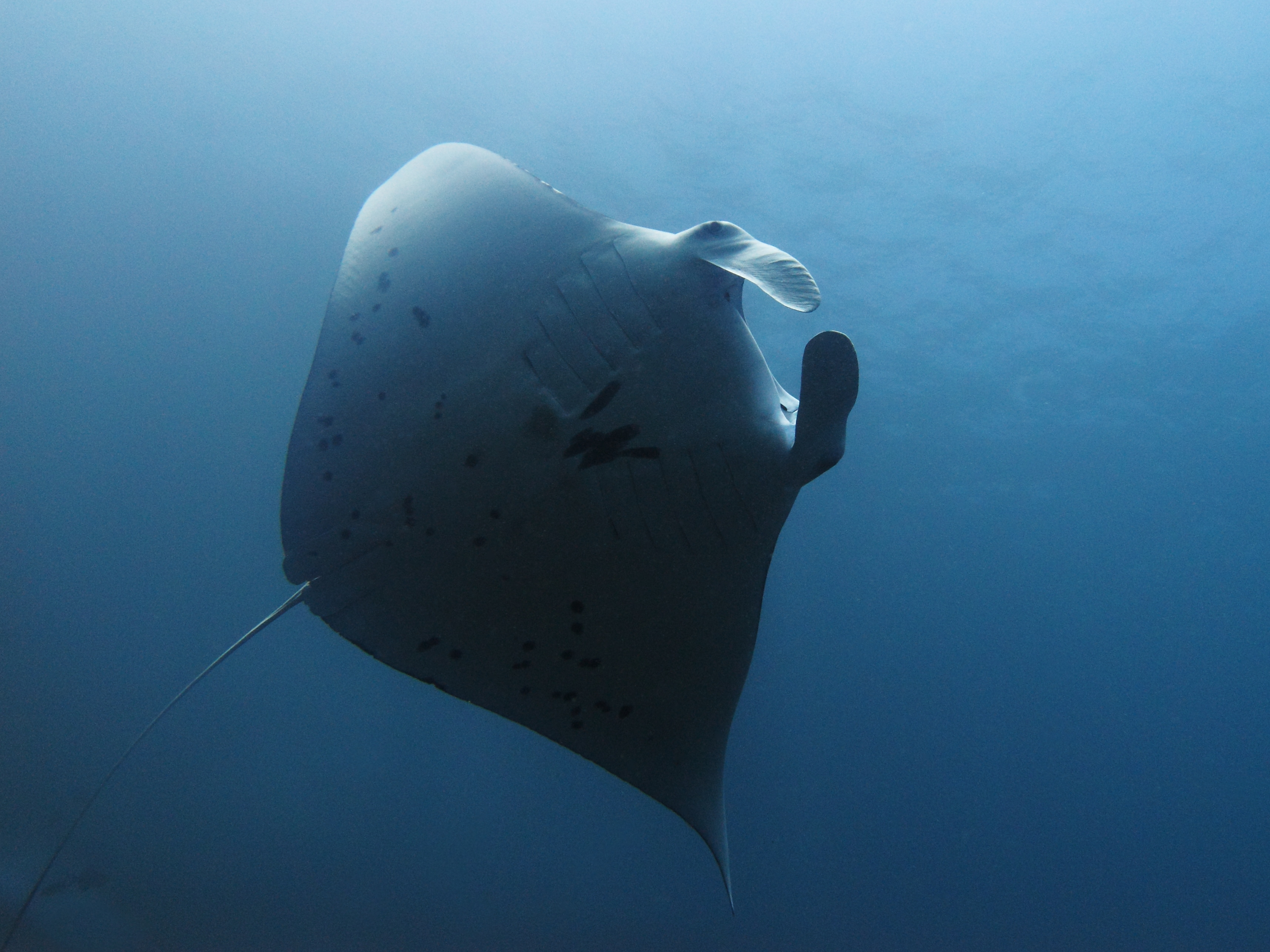
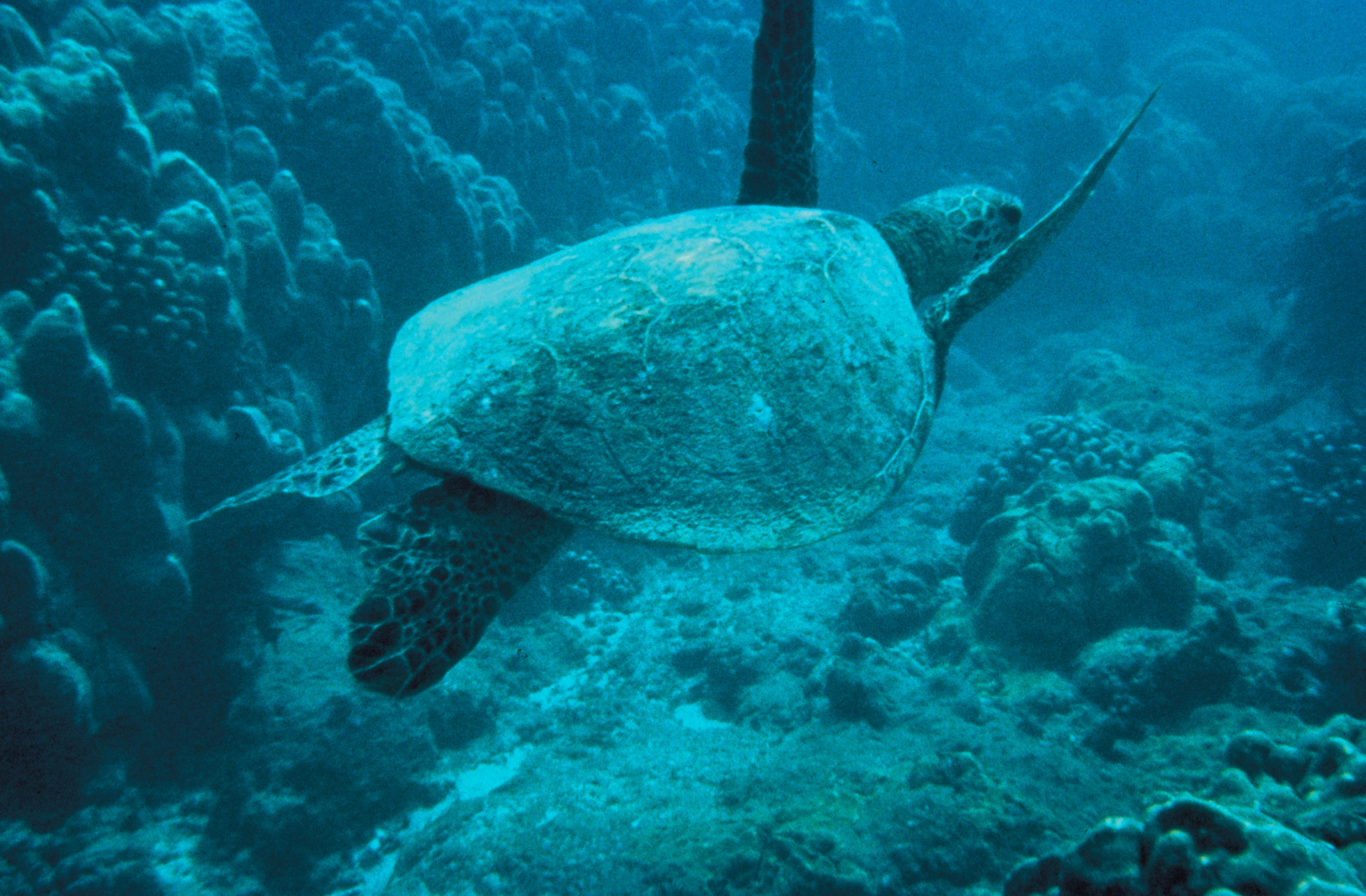
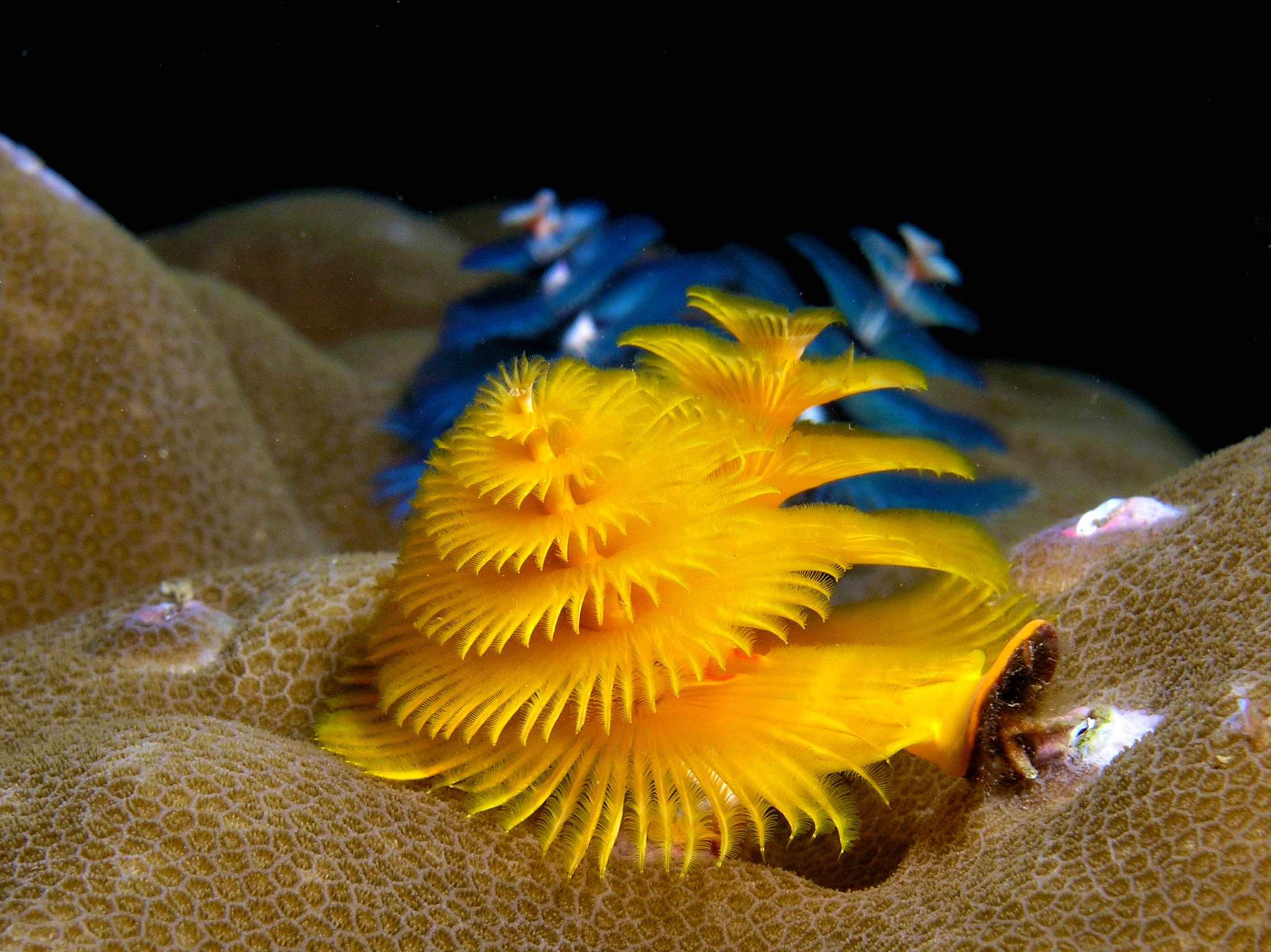
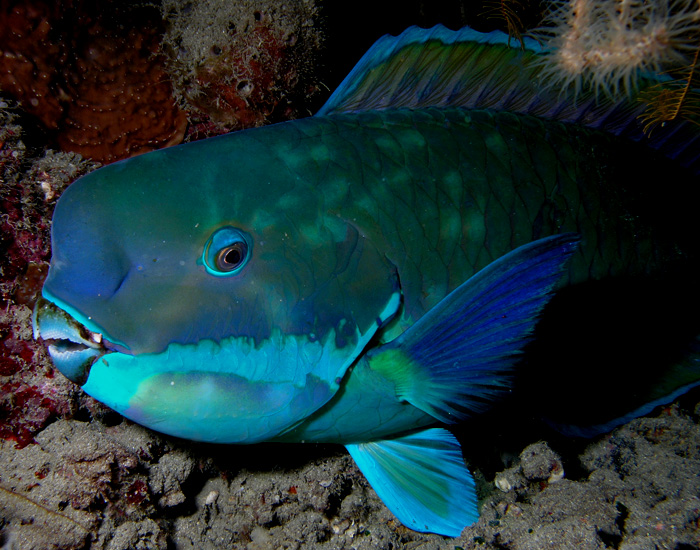
Some of the species in the Coral Triangle region. Clockwise from the left: Table coral Acropora latistella, sea slug Nembrotha kubaryana, Mobula ray, green sea turtle, Christmas tree worms (Spirobranchus giganteus) and a Parrotfish

Percentage of species at risk of disappearing from certain regions by 2080s
| Region | 2 °C (3.6 °F) | 4.5 °C (8.1 °F) |
|---|---|---|
| Altai-Sayan | 18.6 | 37 |
| Amur | 14.2 | 35.6 |
| Borneo | 17.6 | 36.8 |
| Coral Triangle | 19.2 | 41.8 |
| Eastern Himalayas | 12.2 | 29 |
| Greater Black Sea | 26.2 | 56 |
| Lake Baikal | 22.8 | 49.5 |
| Mekong River | 26.4 | 55.2 |
| New Guinea | 19.8 | 41.2 |
| Sumatra | 16.8 | 37 |
| Western Ghats | 18.8 | 41.67 |
| Yangtze River | 20 | 42.6 |

=== Agriculture, economy and society ===
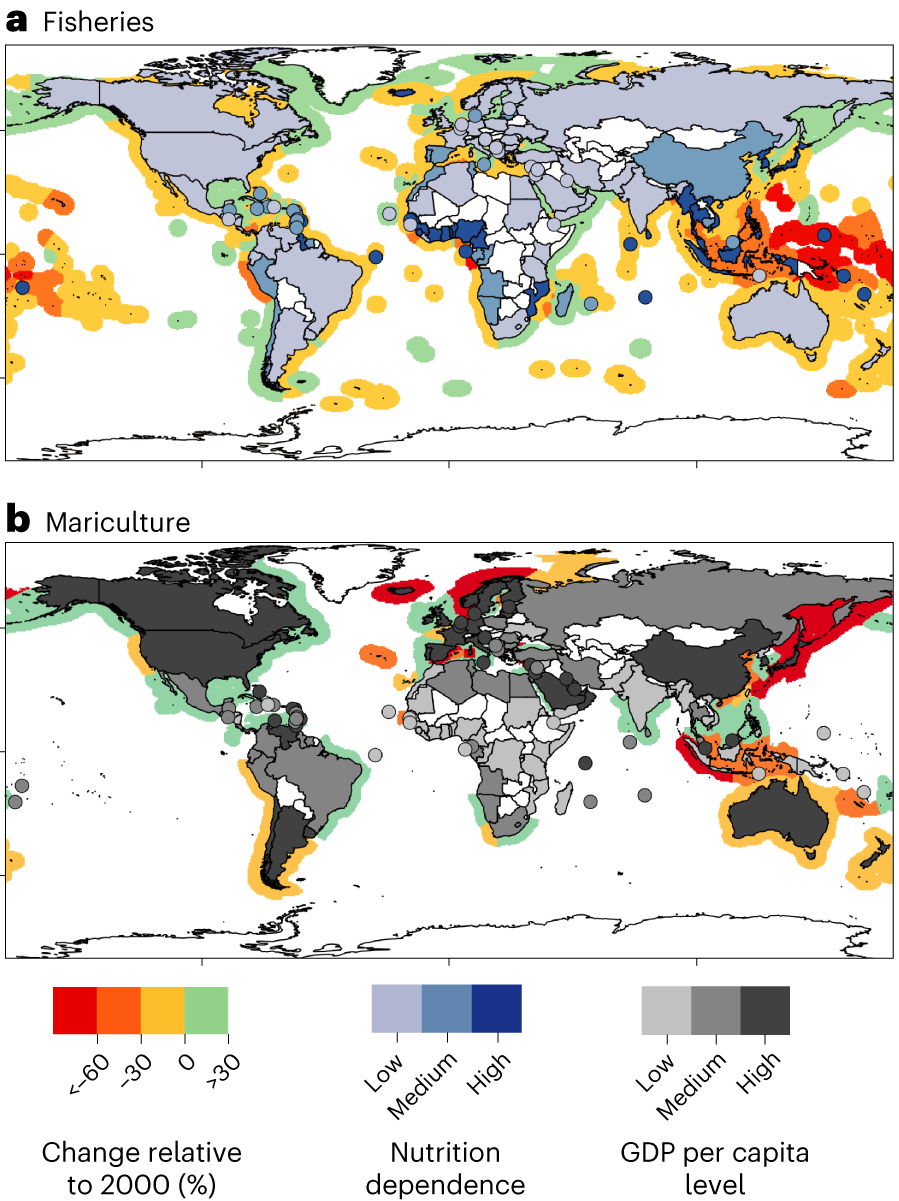
Under the highest-emission scenario, many Asian countries would see substantial reductions in seafood available from their exclusive economic zones by 2050.

In 2019, Asia as a whole was estimated to have 400 million people living in extreme poverty (below 1.9$/day), and 1.2 billion below 3.2$/day. It also accounts for two-thirds of the world's agricultural production and nearly three-quarters of the fisheries and aquaculture output. In India, Pakistan and Bangladesh, around 56%, 43% and 50% of the population work in agriculture, respectively. Even so, 11.4% of Asia's population (515 million people) were undernourished in 2017, which is the largest fraction in the world. While total food production to date had been increasing, climate risks to agriculture and food security are expected to accelerate after 1.5 °C (2.7 °F) is exceeded.

These risks will be regionally uneven, as food security is expected to improve in some countries or even country sub-regions, while declining in others. For instance, coral reefs support 1.5 million fishers in the Indian Ocean and 3.35 million in the Southeast Asia, yet they are highly vulnerable to even low-emission climate change. Southeast Asia may lose around 30% of its aquaculture area and 10-20% of production by 2050-2070. Major agricultural pests such as Colorado potato beetle and Ixodes ricinus have been able to expand their range, and other expansions, such as those of locusts and the golden apple snail are expected in the future. Livestock production in the South Asia region and the country of Mongolia is highly vulnerable to climate change. Global food price spikes and market volatility threaten to affect sociopolitical stability.

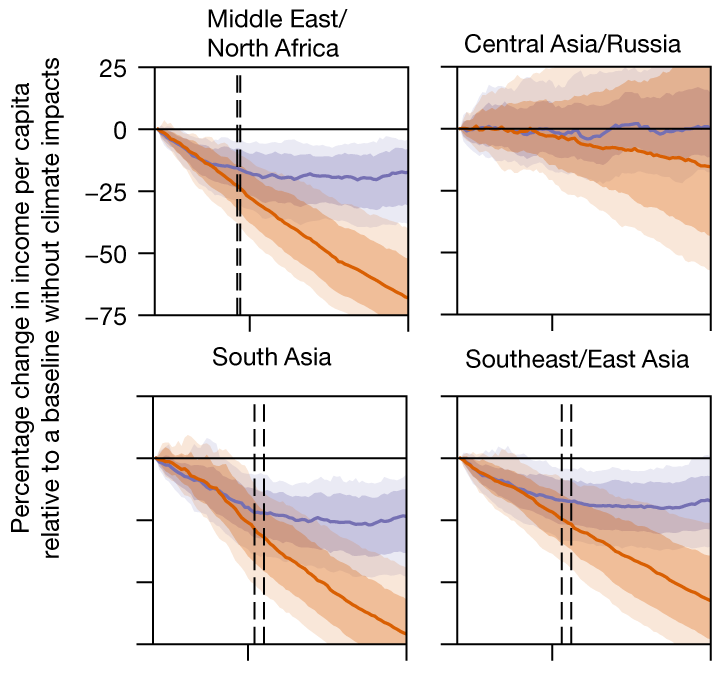
Economic impacts of climate change under high emissions (orange) are estimated to be greater compared to low emissions (blue) after around 2050 (dashed lines) at 1% statistical significance in Middle East, South, Southeast and East Asia, no statistical difference found for Central Asia/Russia region.

In the absence of intervention, malaria incidence could nearly double by 2050 in northern China, and over 100 million people are likely to become exposed to malaria in the near future. Infectious diarrhoea mortality and dengue fever incidence in South Asia is likely to increase as well. Under the high-emission scenario, 40 million people in South Asia (nearly 2% of the population) may be driven to internal migration by 2050 due to climate change. Some research suggests that South Asia would lose 2% of its GDP to climate change by 2050, while these losses would approach 9% by the end of the century under the most intense climate change scenario.

In the 2017 edition of Germanwatch's Climate Risk Index, Bangladesh and Pakistan ranked sixth and seventh respectively as the countries most affected by climate change in the period from 1996 to 2015, while India ranked fourth among the list of countries most affected by climate change in 2015. India is estimated to have the world's highest social cost of carbon - meaning that it experiences the greatest impact from greenhouse gas emissions. Other estimates describe Bangladesh as the country most likely to be the worst-affected.

== Mitigation ==
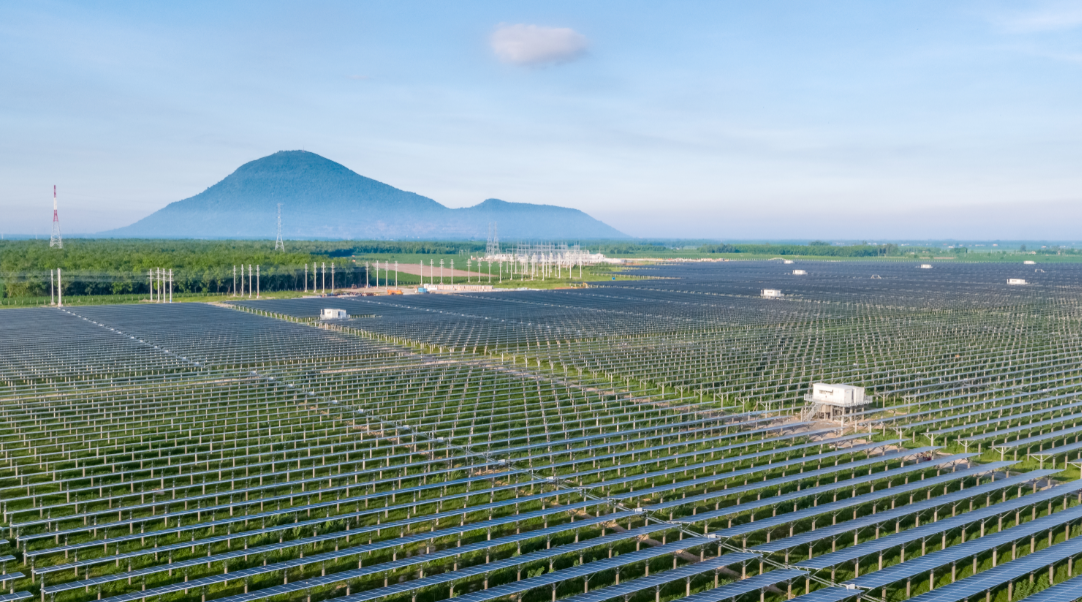
Dau Tieng Solar Power Project, a solar power farm in Tân Châu, Vietnam

Nearly half of the world's new renewable energy capacity is built in Asia. India is known to have a large potential for solar power generation which is currently largely unfulfilled. Nuclear power is also expected to become increasingly prominent in Asia. In particular, nuclear power generation in China will likely be equivalent to that of the OECD countries in 2040. Significant growth is also expected in India and Russia.

Asian countries have also undertaken various mitigation commitments. For instance, India has, as of 2019, promised to cut its emissions intensity (emissions per unit of GDP) by 33-35% by 2030 compared to 2005 levels. However, these efforts are not currently sufficient in order to reach the goals of the Paris Agreement. The most likely way to fulfil them on the continental scale would be to have the renewables account for 35% of total energy consumption in Asia by 2030.

== Adaptation ==
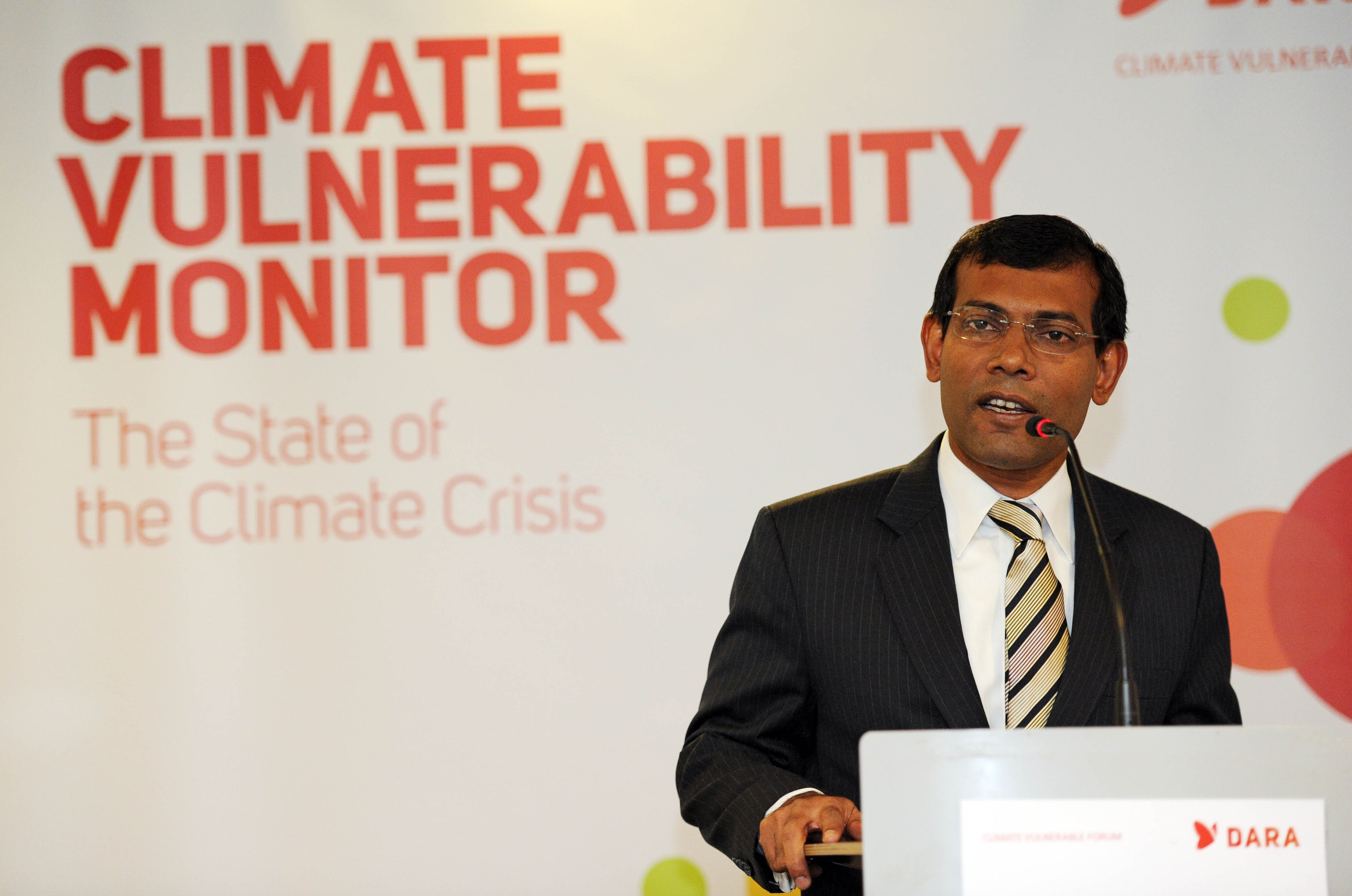
Maldives President Mohamed Nasheed at the launch of the Climate Vulnerability Monitor in 2009

Across Asia, countries and stakeholders are already undertaking a range of adaptation actions. For instance, the National Diet of Japan had passed an official Climate Change Adaptation Act in 2018, while Bangladesh has drawn up an extensive Bangladesh Delta Plan which covers all future development in the context of climate adaptation and would be funded by 2.5% of the annual GDP. Regional forums such as the Asia-Pacific Climate Change Adaption Information Platform (AP-PLAT) also exist. In China, the so-called sponge cities are designed to increase the area of green spaces and permeable pavings to help deal with flash floods from precipitation extremes.

At the same time, many adaptation measures are still limited to preparatory steps. In India, city, district and state governments have been creating Heat Action Plans, but as of 2023, most of them remain unfunded. The Bangladesh Delta Plan was also reported to be falling short of most of its initial targets as of 2020. Association of Southeast Asian Nations (ASEAN) – Brunei, Cambodia, Indonesia, Laos, Malaysia, Myanmar, the Philippines, Singapore, Thailand, and Vietnam – are among the most vulnerable to the effects of climate change in the world, but their climate mitigation efforts have been described as not commensurate with the climate risks faced.

Numerous changes have taken place in the agriculture sector in an effort to adapt to climate change - ranging from interventions like irrigation to a set of practices known as climate-smart agriculture. However, other interventions such as an increase in agricultural insurance coverage are also necessary. Natural environment can be helped to adapt to climate change by increasing the extent of protected areas and providing habitat corridors to facilitate the dispersal of vulnerable species. Mangrove restoration programs exist and tend to be effective.

== By region ==
=== Central Asia ===
- Climate change in Kazakhstan
- Climate change in Kyrgyzstan
- Climate change in Tajikistan
- Climate change in Turkmenistan
- Climate change in Uzbekistan

=== East Asia ===
- Climate change in China
- Climate change in Japan
- Climate change in North Korea
- Climate change in South Korea
- Climate change in Mongolia
- Climate change in Taiwan

=== North Asia ===
- Climate change in Russia

=== Southeast Asia ===
- Climate change in Brunei
- Climate change in Cambodia
- Climate change in Indonesia
- Climate change in Malaysia
- Climate change in Myanmar
- Climate change in Singapore
- Climate change in the Philippines
- Climate change in Thailand
- Climate change in Vietnam

=== South Asia ===
- Climate change in Afghanistan
- Climate change in Bangladesh
- Climate change in Bhutan
- Climate change in India
- Climate change in the Maldives
- Climate change in Nepal
- Climate change in Pakistan
- Climate change in Sri Lanka

=== West Asia ===
- Climate change in Armenia
- Climate change in Azerbaijan
- Climate change in Cyprus
- Climate change in Georgia (country)
- Climate change in Iran
- Climate change in Iraq
- Climate change in Israel
- Climate change in Jordan
- Climate change in Turkey
