= Climate change in Afghanistan =

Emissions, impacts and responses of Afghanistan related to climate change

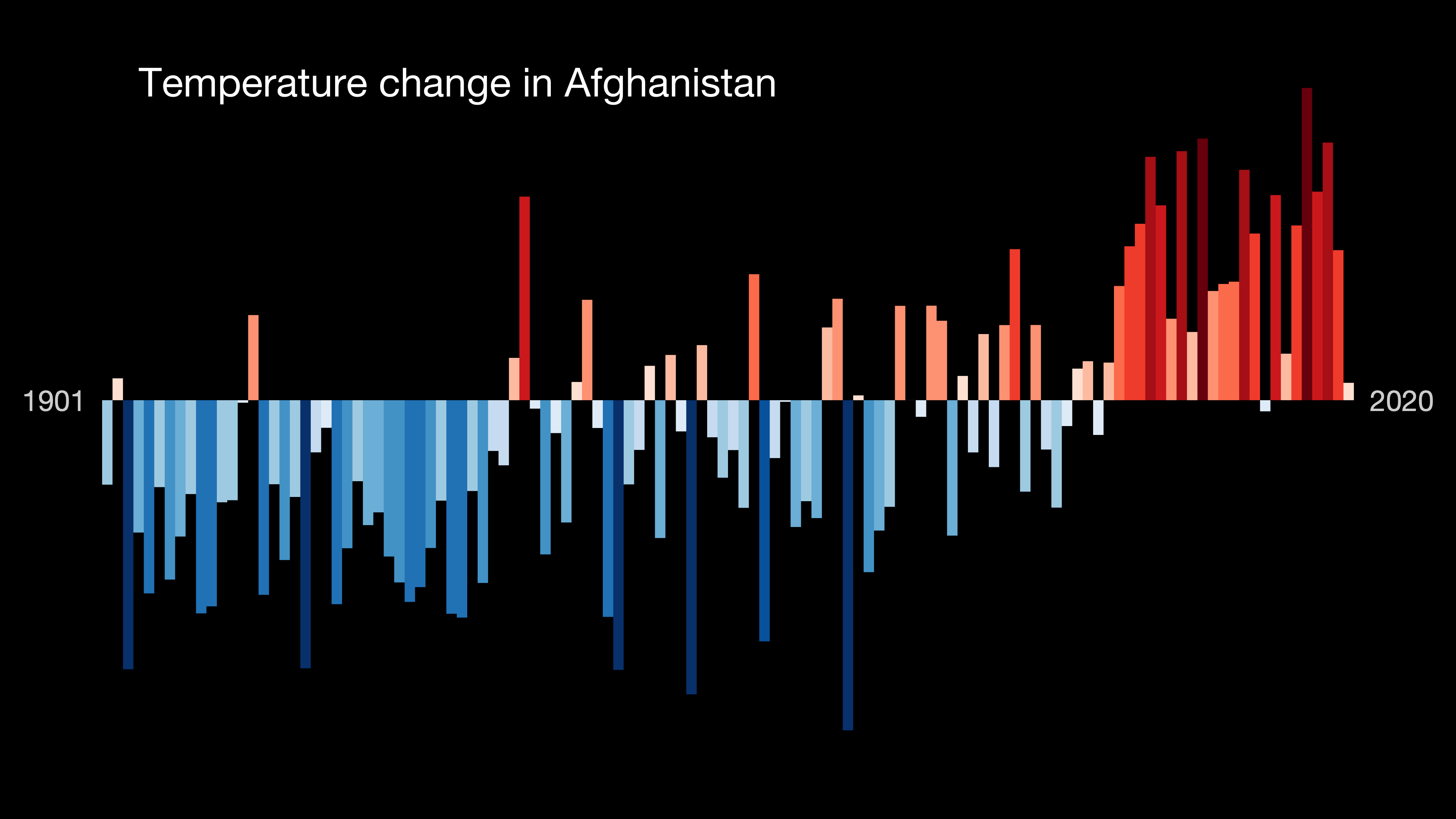
Graph showing temperature change in Afghanistan between 1901 and 2021.

In Afghanistan, climate change has led to a temperature increase of 1.8 °C since 1950. This has caused far-reaching impacts on Afghanistan, culminating from overlapping interactions of natural disasters (due to changes in the climate system), conflict, agricultural dependency, and severe socio-economic hardship.

Due to a combination of political, geographic, and social factors, Afghanistan is one of the most vulnerable nations to climate change impacts. The country ranks as the 7th least prepared to manage the impacts of climate change.

Combined with infrequent earthquakes, climate-related disasters such as floods, flash floods, avalanches and heavy snowfalls on average affect over 200,000 people every year, causing massive losses of lives, livelihoods and properties. These interacting factors, particularly protracted conflicts which erode and challenge the ability to handle, adapt to and plan for climate change at individual and national levels, often turn climate change risks and hazards into disasters.

Although the country itself contributes only very little to global warming with regard to greenhouse gas emissions, droughts due to climate change affect and will affect Afghanistan to a high degree.

== Greenhouse gas emissions ==
Afghanistan is among the lowest emitting countries on earth. In 2023, Afghanistan is estimated to have emitted 11 million tonnes of CO_{2}, or 44 million tonnes of greenhouse gas which would be about one tonne per person. For rough comparison with other countries: India over two tonnes per person, China and Germany around 10, USA and Russia around 20.

Most of Afghanistan's energy is imported from neighboring countries. Of the energy generated within Afghanistan's borders, the majority is generated by hydropower, followed by fossil fuels and solar power.

== Impacts ==
Köppen climate classification map for Afghanistan for 1980–2016

2071–2100 map under the most intense climate change scenario. Mid-range scenarios are currently considered more likely

The World Bank projects that Afghanistan will see a warming higher than the global average, with rises in maximum and minimum temperatures expected to be higher than rises in average temperature.

Afghan officials claimed in November 2022 that climate change was responsible for losses of more than two billion U.S. dollars in that year alone.

=== Drought ===
Since 1950, temperatures in Afghanistan have risen by 1.8 °C. This has led to massive droughts which will continue to worsen. Severe drought conditions affect 25 of the country's 34 provinces, impacting over half of the population.

Over the past four decades, desertification has impacted more than 75% of the land in the country's northern, western, and southern regions. This has led to reduced vegetation for grazing, accelerated land degradation, and negatively affected crop farming in communities like Hakimabad Village, Laghman Province.

Due to increased droughts related to a warming of all regions of the country by 2.0 °C to 6.2 °C by 2090 depending on scenario, Afghanistan will be further confronted with increased desertification and land degradation.

The majority of the country's population is dealing with food insecurity, and this is projected to worsen. Increasing droughts could lead to a boom of the opium production in Afghanistan, as the opium poppy is drought-resistant.

A drought in 2017 and 2018 led to a massive internal displacement within the country. ActionAid claims that by 2050 around 5 million more people could become internally displaced within Afghanistan due to climate change.

=== Floods ===
In addition to droughts, extreme rainfall over short periods will increase due to climate change, increasing the risk of flooding and landslides. In August 2022 officials from the State Ministry for Natural Disaster Management reported that flash floods across Afghanistan in the past year resulted in 511 deaths and over 3,700 injuries. The floods also destroyed over 23,000 homes and 66,700 acres of farmland, killing nearly 8,000 livestock.

The basin of the Kunduz River has seen a decrease in precipitation of 30% since the 1960s, which is compensated by increasing glacier melt. Almost 14% of Afghanistan's glacier coverage was lost between 1990 and 2015. By 2100, the Hindu Kush Himalaya region could lose 60% of its glaciers. In some regions the number of glaciers and glacial lakes has increased, probably due to the breaking up of larger glaciers as they melt. Mountainous regions such as the area at the source of the Amu Darya will be at great risk of glacial lake outburst floods. A glacial lake outburst in Panjshir Valley triggered a flash flood on 12 July 2018, resulting in the death of ten people.

== Mitigation and adaptation ==
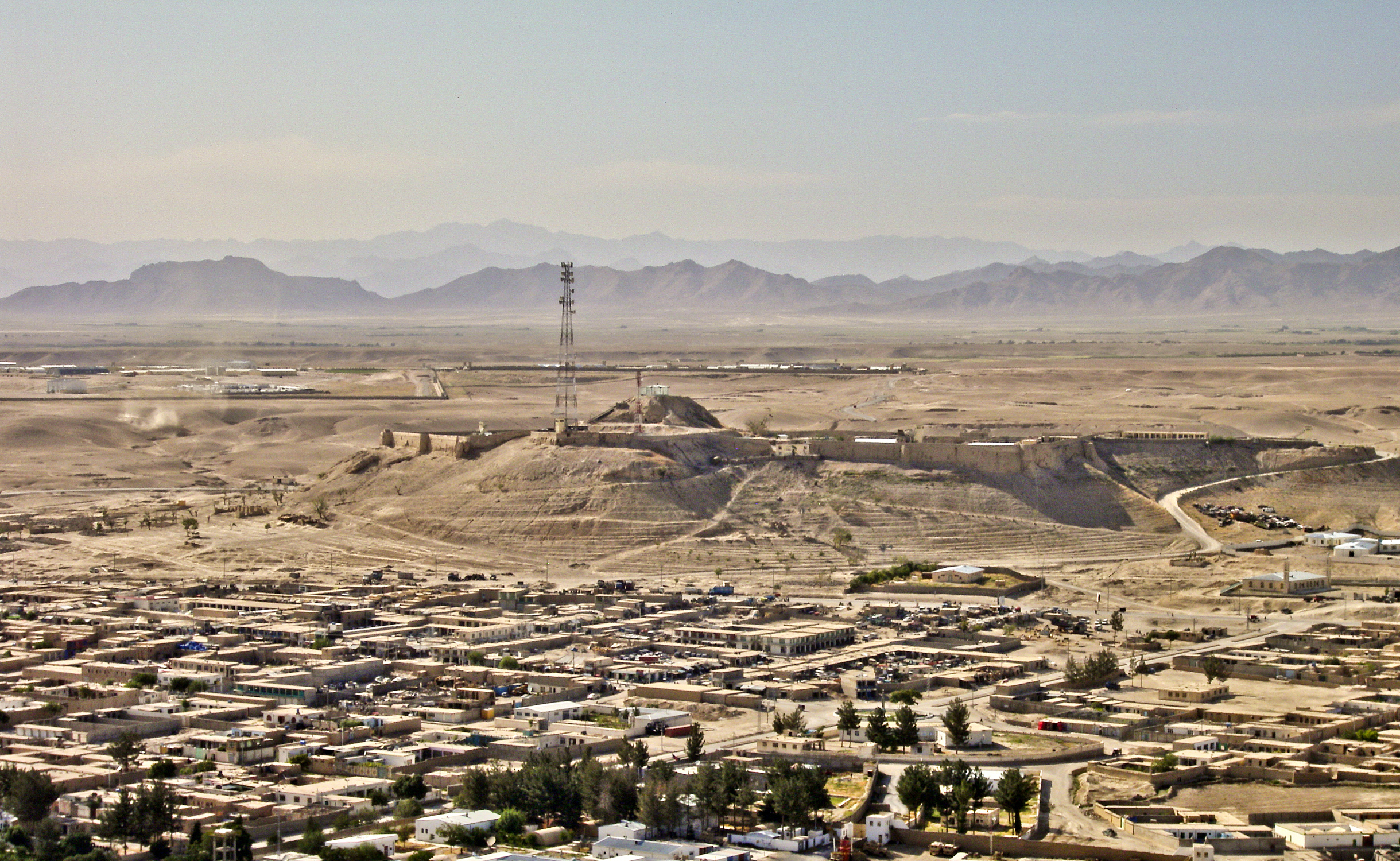
Qalat, Zabul Province in 2010

As the nation is a low emitter of greenhouse gases but highly vulnerable to climate change impacts, adaption is urgent.

In 2016, Afghanistan submitted its first Nationally Determined Contribution (NDC) plan under the Paris Agreement, pledging a "13.6% reduction in greenhouse gas emissions by 2030... conditional on external support." Agriculture, health and disaster risk management are key focuses, while the country's lack of financial resources to combat climate change was highlighted. The plan outlined that by 2030 at least 2.5 billion U.S. dollars were needed for watershed management and $4.5 billion for restoring irrigation systems.

As of 2021, the Asian Development Bank (ADB) has committed more than $900 million, for irrigation and agriculture infrastructure projects to help with food security, agribusiness, and enhancement of water resources management through a climate resilience approach.

=== International cooperation ===
Taliban officials has lamented the loss of hundreds of millions in aid money for environmental projects since August 2021, protested Afghanistan's exclusion from COP27, and has requested international aid in tackling climate change. A delegation from Afghanistan was invited to attend COP29, but not as party to the negotiations.

The Taliban has argued that the climate crisis is not a political issue. As of 2024, generally the Taliban government believes that climate change is real, foreign powers are responsible for it and it is a religious duty to fight it. The Taliban’s environmental policy is largely linked to religion. Some of them fear that climate change is at best a God’s punishment and at worst a sign of the apocalypse. The government has asked imams across Afghanistan to preach for protecting the environment.

The Taliban organized an international climate change conference in Jalalabad, but few foreign guests arrived, as Afghanistan remains a global pariah due Taliban policies such as restrictions on female education. This isolation has cut climate funding for the country, although the United Nations is still funding some projects. Consequently, the government is mostly addressing climate change independently, while blaming its impacts and slow financial aid on foreigners. Public outreach efforts include, for example, educating farmers about adaptation efforts, such as preserving natural grass cover to absorb rain, and to leave rocks that serve as natural flood barriers undisturbed.

== See also ==
- Climate change in South Asia
- Drought in Afghanistan
- Environmental issues in Afghanistan
