= Climate change in Taiwan =

Emissions, impacts and responses of Taiwan related to climate change

Climate change in Taiwan has caused temperatures to rise by 1.4 degrees Celsius in the last 100 years. Sea level rise around Taiwan is occurring at twice the global rate. The government pledged to reduce emissions by 20% in 2030 and 50% in 2050, compared to 2005 levels.

== Greenhouse gas emissions ==
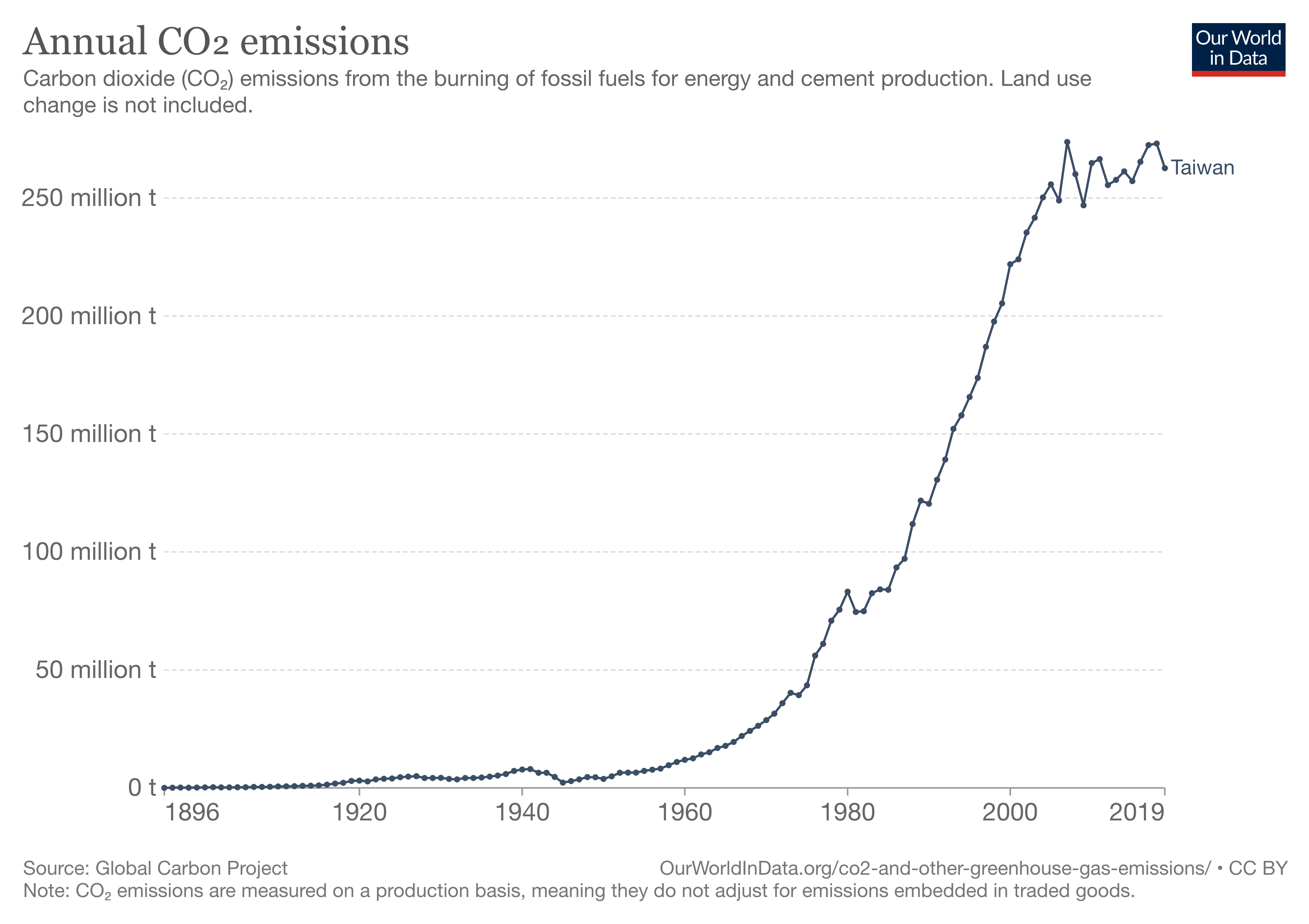
The annual CO_{2} emissions of Taiwan between 1896 and 2019.

In 2023, Taiwan was responsible for 0.69% of worldwide CO_{2} emissions with 261.15 million tonnes total and 11.47 tonnes per capita. Between 2005 and 2023, the total CO_{2} emissions decreased by 2.15% and the per capita CO_{2} emissions decreased by 4.19%. Taichung Power Plant had the fifth highest carbon emissions of any fossil fuel power plant in the world in 2018. In that year, it emitted 29.9 million tons of carbon dioxide, a rate 28% higher than other fossil fuel plants in Taiwan. The government of Taiwan has pledged to reduce emissions by 20% in 2030 and 50% in 2050 compared to 2005 levels.

== Impacts on the natural environment ==
=== Temperature and weather changes ===
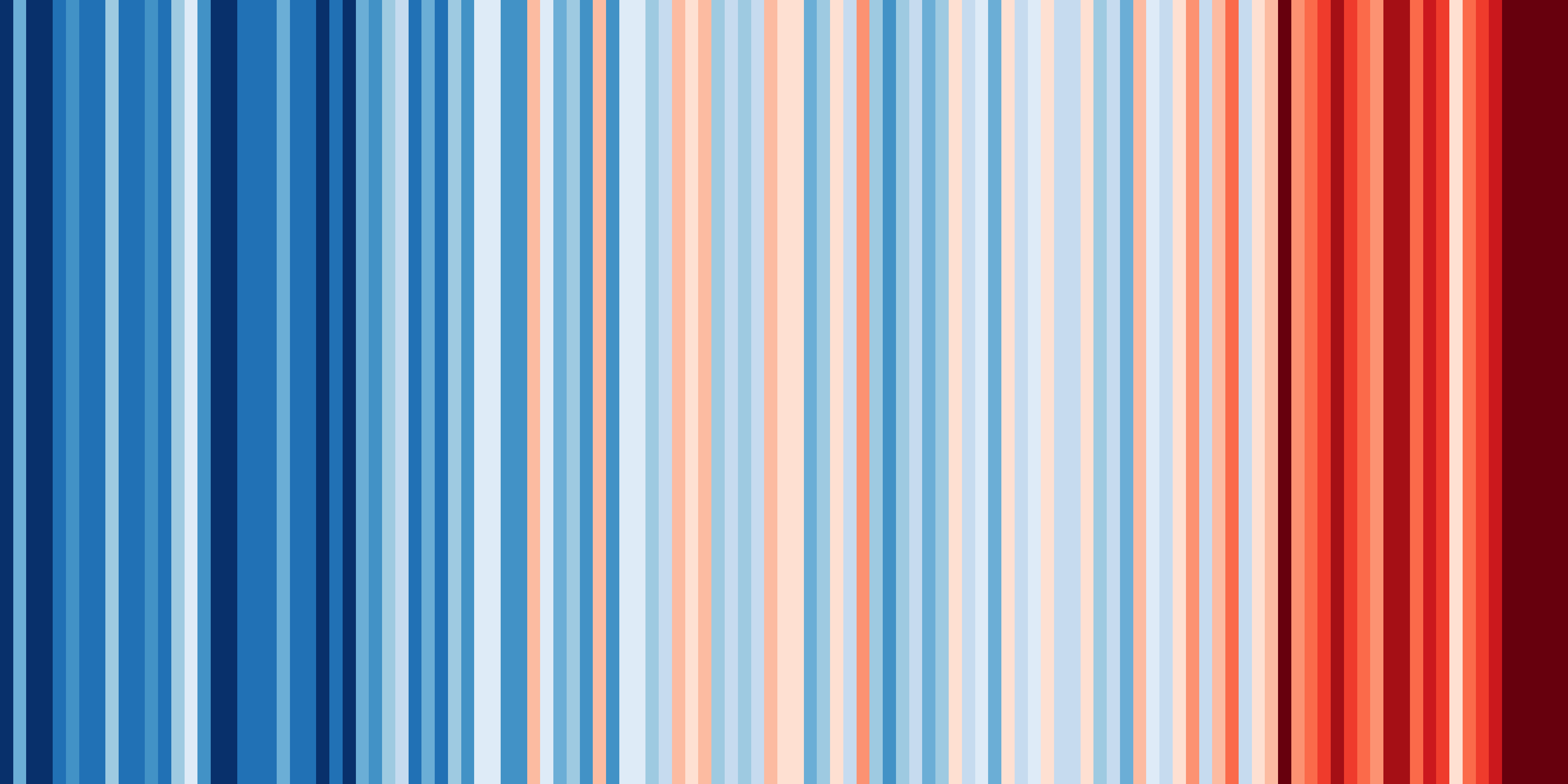
Warming stripes Taiwan from 1901 to 2019

Köppen climate classification map for Taiwan for 1980–2016

2071–2100 map under the most intense climate change scenario. Mid-range scenarios are currently considered more likely

According to the Taiwan Climate Change Projection Information and Adaptation Knowledge Platform (TCCIP), the number of days above 36 degrees Celsius in the plains of Taiwan can go from less than 1 day a year in 2021 to 48.1 days in 2100 if the global temperature rise isn't kept under 1.5 degrees Celsius. If it is kept under 1.5 degrees Celsius there would be 6.6 days a years with such high temperatures. By the end of the century, summers could be extended from 80 days to 210 days, while winters could become shortened to anywhere from 0 to 50 days, compared to 70 days in 2021. The summer of 2020 was recorded as having the hottest weather ever in Taiwan at the time. This record has since been broken, with 2024 reaching new record high temperatures.

=== Sea level rise ===
In a report that Greenpeace Taiwan published in August 2020, it was reported that the sea level around Taiwan was rising at twice the global rate. Six municipalities which account for more than 70% of the population are in danger of sea level rise and storm surges. Places like the Presidential Office Building in Taipei, Songshan Airport, and parts of Kaohsiung would be flooded. The municipality of Tainan would see the largest amount of damage due to flooding.

=== Ecosystems ===
Sea level rise in Taiwan

Coral reefs, seagrass beds, and algal beds are all at risk from coastal effects of climate change including ocean acidification, increasing temperatures, and sea level rise.

Coral reefs in Taiwan have experienced bleaching, with 2020 experiencing the worst bleaching in 22 years. Thirty one percent of coral reefs around Taiwan are dying due to high temperatures in the sea water. Fifty two percent of the coral is experiencing different levels of heat stress and 31% is dying in an irreversible process.

=== Water resources ===
Historically, typhoons made landfall three to four times a year and refilled Taiwan's reservoirs. From 2010 to 2020, the average number of typhoons to make landfall was only 2.5 a year, with 2020 seeing no typhoons make landfall for the first time in over 50 years. As a result, Taiwan faced water shortages and severe drought.

At the end of the century, conditions that cause typhoons to be less frequent will also lead to four to eight percent stronger winds and a greater quantity of rainfall per storm. Despite a predicted increase of 30 to 40 percent more rain per storm, there would be a decrease in annual rainfall overall, a situation that could increase the incidence of both flooding and droughts. Northern Taiwan could experience more frequent spring droughts between 2040 and 2060, which would have an effect on water use for the public as well as agriculture.

== Mitigation and adaptation ==
=== Policies and legislation ===
The Taiwanese government has pledged to increase renewable energy usage to 20% by 2025. The government pledged to reduce emissions by 20% in 2030 and 50% in 2050, compared to 2005 levels, which was signed to by the 2015 Taiwan Greenhouse Gas Reduction and Management Act. This would not be enough to keep global temperatures between 1.5 and 2 degrees Celsius, according to the Risk Society and Policy Research Center (RSPRC) of National Taiwan University. The government of Taiwan has invested in the wind turbine industry, Taiwan had the 8th biggest offshore wind market in the world in 2019.

==== Pricing of carbon ====
In 2009, the Chung-Hua Institution for Economic Research (CIER), which had been commissioned by the government to advise on its plan to overhaul the nation's taxes, recommended a levy of NT$2,000 (US$61.8, £37.6) per tonne of CO_{2} emissions. As a result, vice finance minister Chang Sheng-ho announced a plan for a carbon tax in starting 2011, with the revenues funding low-income families and public transport. However, Premier Wu Den-yih opposed implementing the tax, arguing it would increase public suffering during the then ongoing recession.

As opposed to the commonly adopted carbon tax, Taiwan's Climate Change Response Act has proposed implementation of a carbon fee. This would require local companies emitting more than 25,000 tonnes of carbon per year to pay a fee. The carbon fee would come into effect from 2024 or 2025 and would start with large emitters, while other carbon emitting groups would be added subsequently after the initial law is passed.

Carbon fee collection began to take effect on January 1, 2025 at the standard rate of NT$300 and must be paid by May of 2026. Lower rates are available for entities that submit carbon reduction plans. The next focus of the Ministry of Environment (MOENV) will be an emissions trading scheme (ETS).

== Society and culture ==
=== Public perception ===
According to a 2020 survey conducted by the RSPRC, 85% of Taiwanese said that they have experienced the effects of climate change on some level. When asked what the government's long term priorities should be, 38.7% of survey respondents said the government should focus on acceleration of energy transition and reduction in carbon. There is bipartisan support from the Pan-Blue camp (76.2%) and the Pan-Green camp (84%) for the proactive promotion of an energy transition. A majority (78.5%) of the respondents supported the government's target to have 20% of the country's energy come from renewable sources by 2025. Public opinion on phasing out fossil fuels was split with 44.7% in favor of it and 43.7% against it. 59.8% of respondents said that businesses should be required to have energy transition obligations if they received stimulus from the government to help them through COVID-19, 77.2% of respondents wanted the same type of obligations for airlines.

Academics and experts were the most trusted source of energy information (59.3%), environmental groups came second (37.6%), and government agencies were the third most trusted (26.6%). Respondents of the 2020 survey were asked to use a scale of one to seven to rate Taiwan's energy transition policy on fairness, planning, and urgency. Urgency received the highest score of the three, with an average of 4.32, followed by fairness (3.83), and how well planned it was (3.74).

In the 2024 RSPRC survey, 80.9% of respondents expressed concern over global warming and 90.1% thought that the government should provide resources to workers experiencing the negative effects of severe weather. However, 59.8% felt that the government did not properly take into account public opinion when deciding matters of carbon reduction policy.

== See also ==
- Plug-in electric vehicles in Taiwan
