= Environmental issues in Brunei =

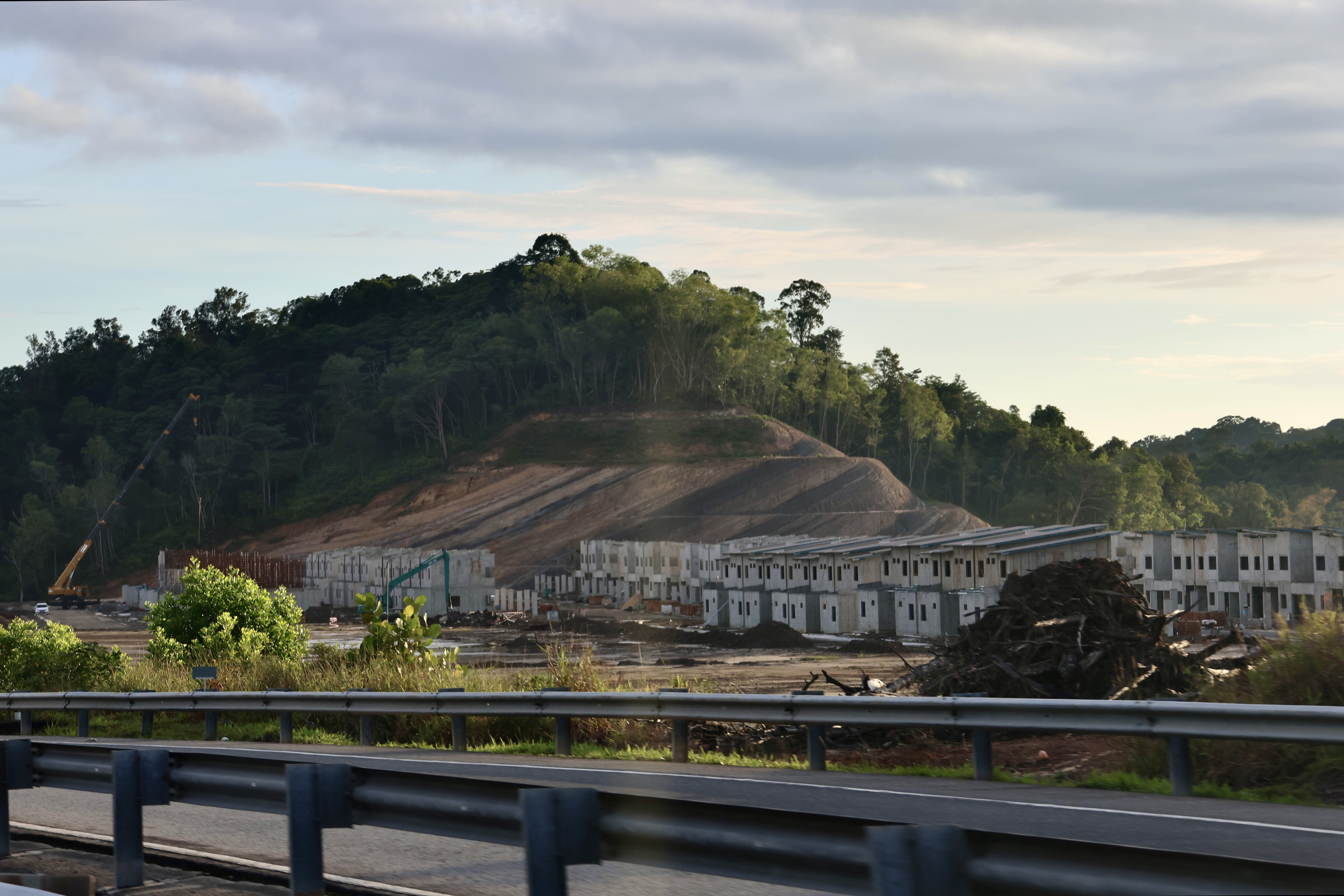
Clearing of forests and land around Lugu.

With a score of 63.57, Brunei comes in at number 53 out of 180 nations in the Environmental Performance Index (EPI). In some EPI areas, including as water and sanitation, heavy metals, air quality, and biodiversity and habitat, Brunei scores better than the average score for Asia and the Pacific. But there is still opportunity for improvement, particularly in terms of ecosystem health, such as air pollution, climate and energy, forests, fisheries and water resources. In Brunei, addressing climate change and enhancing ecosystem vitality, environmental health, and catastrophe resilience all have the potential to spur innovation and job growth in the green economy.

== Climate change ==
The government's initiative in the Sustainable Development Program began in 1991. Since that time, environmental awareness among Bruneians has increased, and the country's regional and global environmental activities have gained traction. One such is Brunei's participation in the Multilateral Environmental Agreements (MEAs), a global effort to address environmental problems. Notable agreements include Brunei's participation in the Kyoto Protocol in 2009, the Paris Agreement in 2015, and the United Nations Framework Convention on Climate Change (UNFCCC) in 2007. Finding state-level solutions to address climate change vulnerabilities that could affect Brunei's future development is the country's current challenge. Brunei has been making investments since 2007 to realize the Brunei Vision 2035.

Due to its geographical location and lengthy coastline, Brunei is exposed to a number of environmental problems. Alarmingly, due to the rise in sea level and a steady rise in temperature, the frequency of flash floods has recently increased. Some low-lying areas, including those in the Belait and Tutong districts, experienced flooding in August 2021 as a result of the unpredictability of the weather.

== Deforestation ==
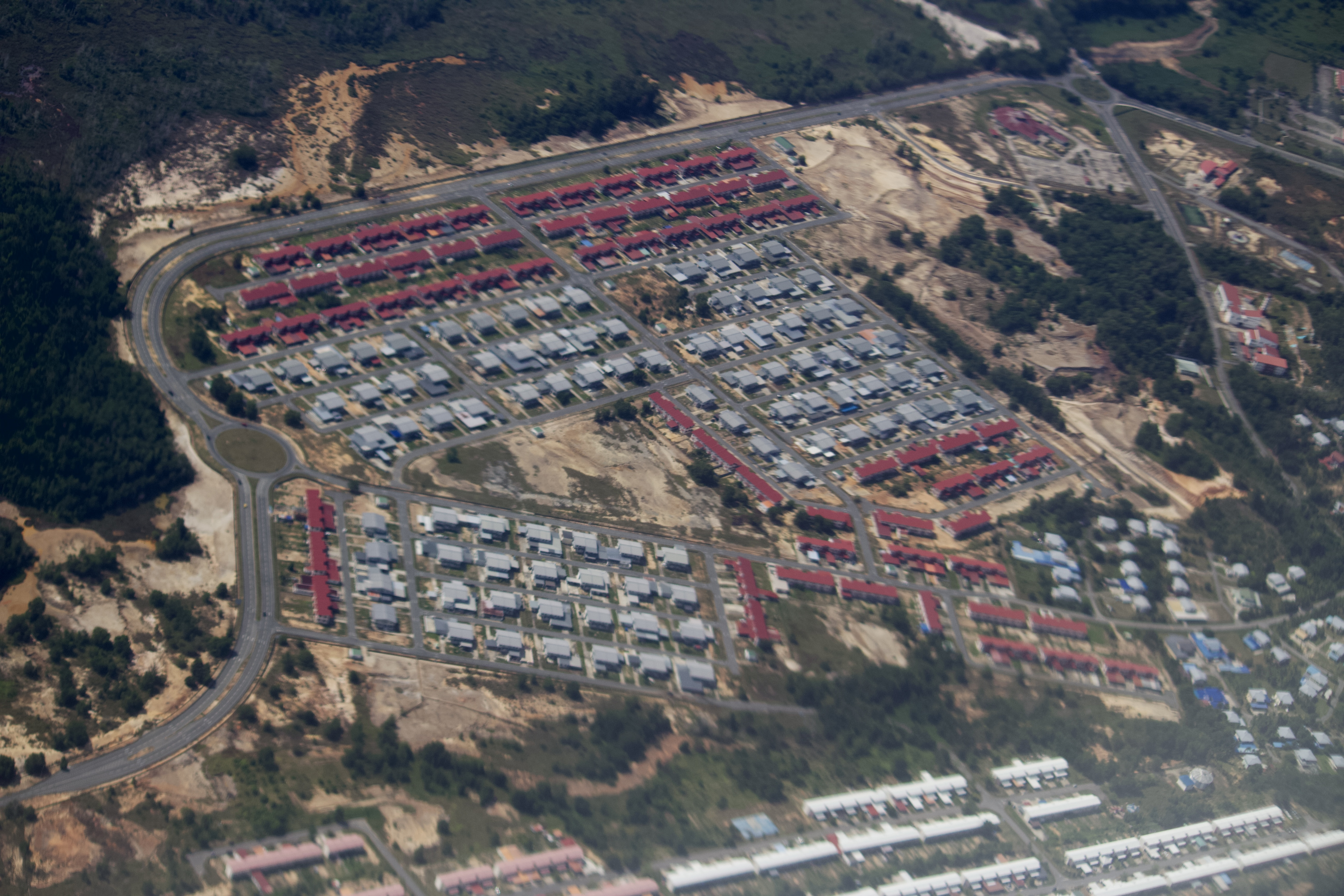
Large area of trees cleared to make way of a public housing scheme.

92% of Brunei's geographical area was covered by trees in 2010, totaling 529 kha. It lost 953 hectares (2,350 acres) of tree cover in 2021, which is the same as 645 kilotonnes (635,000 long tons; 711,000 short tons) of CO_{2} emissions. Brunei lost 14.8 kha of humid primary forest between 2002 and 2021, accounting for 52% of the country's overall loss of tree cover during that time. The total area of Brunei's primary humid forest shrunk by 3.4% over this time. Around 6.3% of the total land area's forest area was lost between 1990 and 2016. According to the World Database on Protected Areas (WDPA) published by the United Nations Environment Programme World Conservation Monitoring Centre (UNEP-WCMC), information on endangered species in Brunei as of 2017 is available. The third-largest island in the world, Borneo, which is shared by Malaysia, Kalimantan in Indonesia, and Brunei, is predicted to lose roughly 220,000 km sq. of forest between 2010 and 2030, or almost 30% of its total land area.

The Glasgow Leaders' Declaration on Forests and Land Use was endorsed by Brunei and more than 110 other nations at the 26th session of the United Nations Conference on Climate Change (COP26). Brunei has joined the effort by endorsing the declaration in order to, among other things, facilitate trade and development policies that do not promote deforestation and land degradation, reduce vulnerability, build resilience, and improve rural livelihoods, implement sustainable agriculture, hasten the transition to a resilient economy, and promote forest, sustainable land use, biodiversity, and climate goals.

=== Tree cover extent and loss ===
Global Forest Watch publishes annual estimates of tree cover loss and 2000 tree cover extent derived from time-series analysis of Landsat satellite imagery in the Global Forest Change dataset. In this framework, tree cover refers to vegetation taller than 5 m (including natural forests and tree plantations), and tree cover loss is defined as the complete removal of tree cover canopy for a given year, regardless of cause.

For Brunei, country statistics report cumulative tree cover loss of 32,437 ha (324.37 km^{2}) from 2001 to 2024 (about 6.1% of its 2000 tree cover area). For tree cover density greater than 30%, country statistics report a 2000 tree cover extent of 529,333 ha (5,293.33 km^{2}). The charts and table below display this data. In simple terms, the annual loss number is the area where tree cover disappeared in that year, and the extent number shows what remains of the 2000 tree cover baseline after subtracting cumulative loss. Forest regrowth is not included in the dataset.

Annual tree cover loss in Brunei, 2001–2024. View chart definition.
Tree cover extent in 2000 minus cumulative tree cover loss in Brunei, 2001–2024 (loss-only residual; does not account for gain). View chart definition.

Annual tree cover extent and loss
Year	Tree cover extent (km2) (Note: This residual measure does not include forest regrowth.)	Annual tree cover loss (km2)
2001	5,280.89	12.44
2002	5,270.00	10.89
2003	5,262.01	7.99
2004	5,250.05	11.96
2005	5,237.27	12.78
2006	5,227.14	10.13
2007	5,211.50	15.64
2008	5,198.49	13.01
2009	5,176.79	21.70
2010	5,167.13	9.66
2011	5,140.92	26.21
2012	5,122.55	18.37
2013	5,113.67	8.88
2014	5,091.42	22.25
2015	5,073.82	17.60
2016	5,048.10	25.72
2017	5,038.66	9.44
2018	5,030.60	8.06
2019	5,018.92	11.68
2020	5,007.26	11.66
2021	4,997.74	9.52
2022	4,988.54	9.20
2023	4,979.38	9.16
2024	4,968.96	10.42

== Air pollution ==
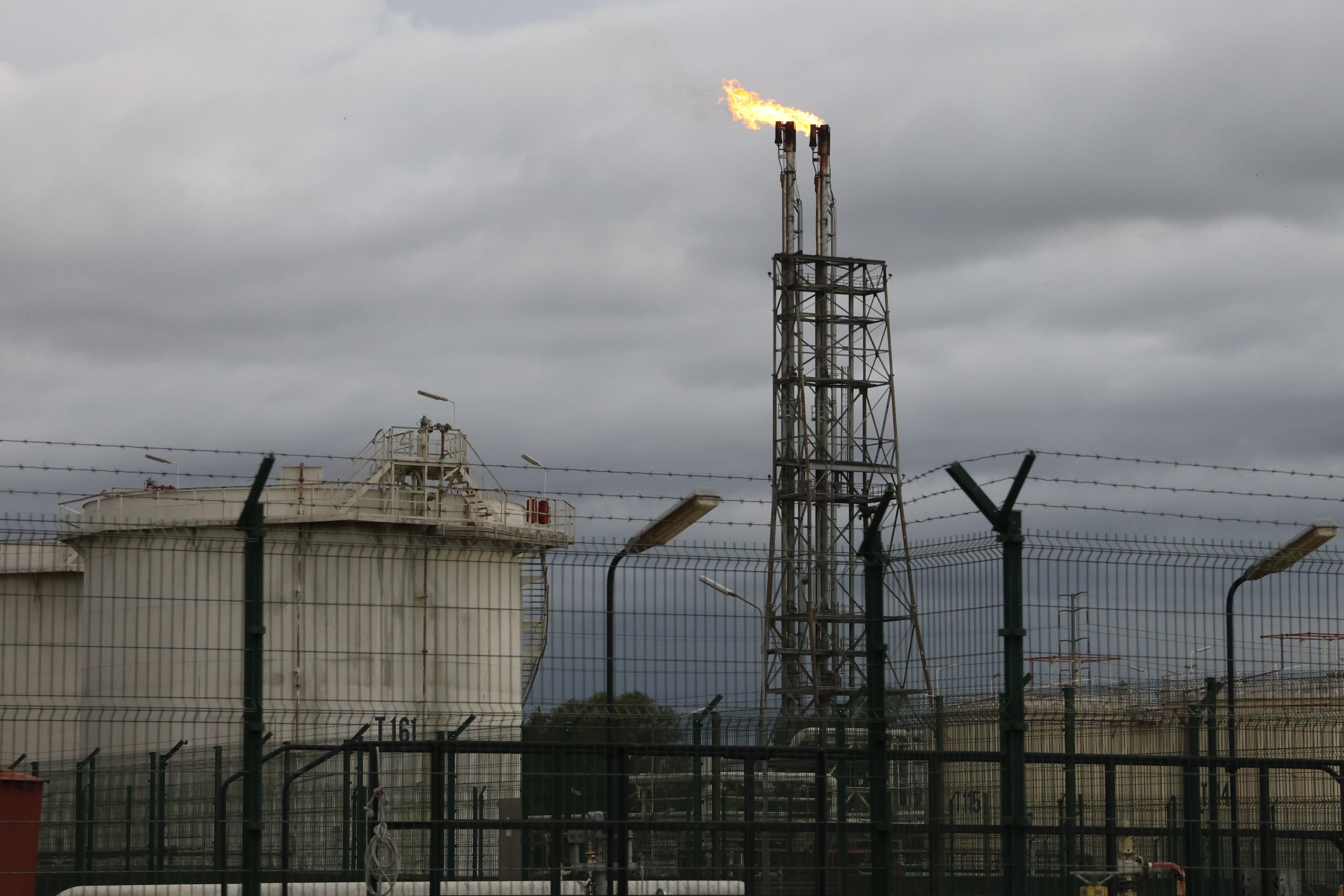
Seria oil field's refinery

From 1990 to 2014, Brunei's carbon dioxide emission levels grew by an average of 2%. The two main causes of the growth were the production of power and the use of fuel in the transportation industry. 8 In comparison to the averages for the Asia-Pacific and ASEAN since 1990, the amount of emissions is much lower. Despite that, Brunei has attained 100% air quality in the "Good" PSI range in 2022, and has access to clean air for the majority of the year.

Brunei has not yet faced significant air pollution, but there are seasonal changes, with transboundary haze from neighboring countries causing the maximum pollution levels to occur during the dry season (February to April). The industries that extract, refine, and produce electricity from petroleum can all have an impact on the air quality in Brunei. The air quality in Brunei is deemed safe by the World Health Organization's standards. The country's annual mean PM 2.5 concentration, according to the most recent statistics, is 6 g/m3, which is less than the advised maximum of 10 g/m3. Since 2003, Brunei has participated in the ASEAN Agreement on Transboundary Haze Pollution along with other ASEAN Member States. The ten ASEAN nations are obligated to control transboundary haze pollution by preventing, monitoring, and mitigating land and forest fires as parties to the agreement.

The Department of Environment, Parks and Recreation (JASTRe), Ministry of Development, is responsible for monitoring the air quality in Brunei. The Department has been running and maintaining a network of automatic real-time air monitoring stations since 2005. These stations are strategically placed in the country's four districts and provide PSI measurements every day on the Department's website. Seven monitoring stations are currently run directly under JASTRe. The central monitoring station at the Department's headquarters in Bandar Seri Begawan is connected to these stations. PM 10 and PM 2.5 pollutants are under observation.

== Water pollution ==
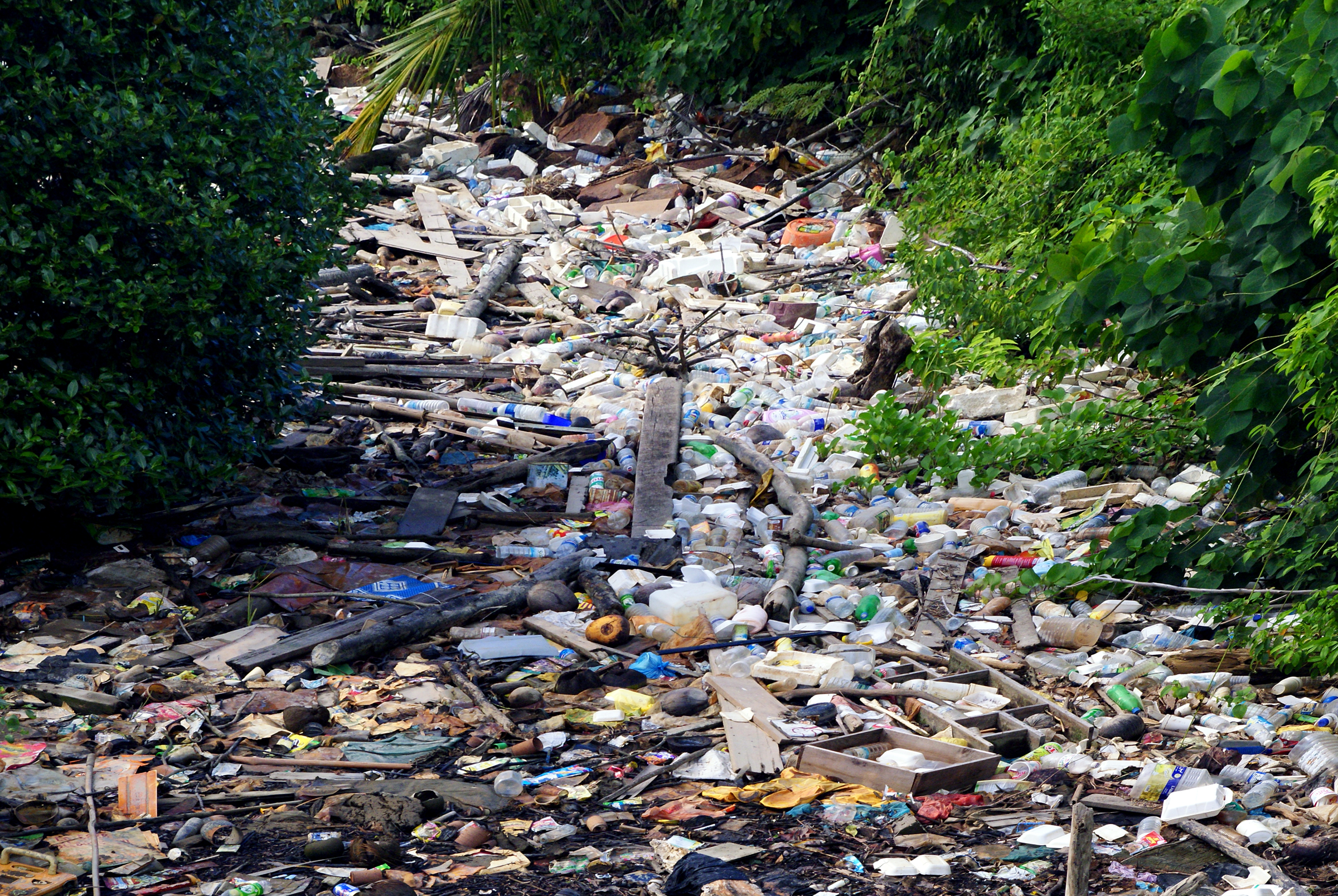
Wastes seen piling up along a stream in Kampong Ayer.

River water is the main source of Brunei's drinking water. Water supplies are under increasing stress due to population growth and industrialization, not just in Brunei but also everywhere in the world. It is crucial to manage water resources in light of the changing climate. This study set out to determine whether Brunei's recent changes in water quality might be linked to climatic change. The study looked at three-year rainfall data as well as time series data from water quality metrics. Auto-correlation and partial auto-correlation functions were used to analyze the time series data. The findings indicated that the climate had changed, as evidenced by a drop in precipitation and an increase in rainfall intensity.

In order to improve the quality of its water resources and ensure their sustainability for years to come, Brunei has a number of challenges, according to an expert who spoke at a seminar recently conducted at the Ministry of Development Training Institute. Although Brunei's point source pollution is regulated, the nation has not yet been able to control its non-point source pollution, which accounts for between 30% and 40% of the total pollutant load, Professor Guo Zhenren of Brunei's Institute of Technology (ITB) told The Brunei Times outside the seminar.

Over the previous two months, 20,000 bags of trash, primarily made up of plastic bags and bottles, have been removed from the Brunei River by contractors employed by the JASTRe. The garbage was gathered as part of a four-month operation started by JASTRe on 16 April 2018 to clean up plastic pollution in Kampong Ayer, Brunei's water village. According to the department's interim director Martinah Tamit, the campaign focused on places like Mukim Saba, Mukim Peramu, Mukim Burong Pingai Ayer, and Mukim Tamoi where trash collects on riverbanks and beneath stilt homes.

== See also ==
- Wildlife of Brunei
