= Climate change in South Korea =

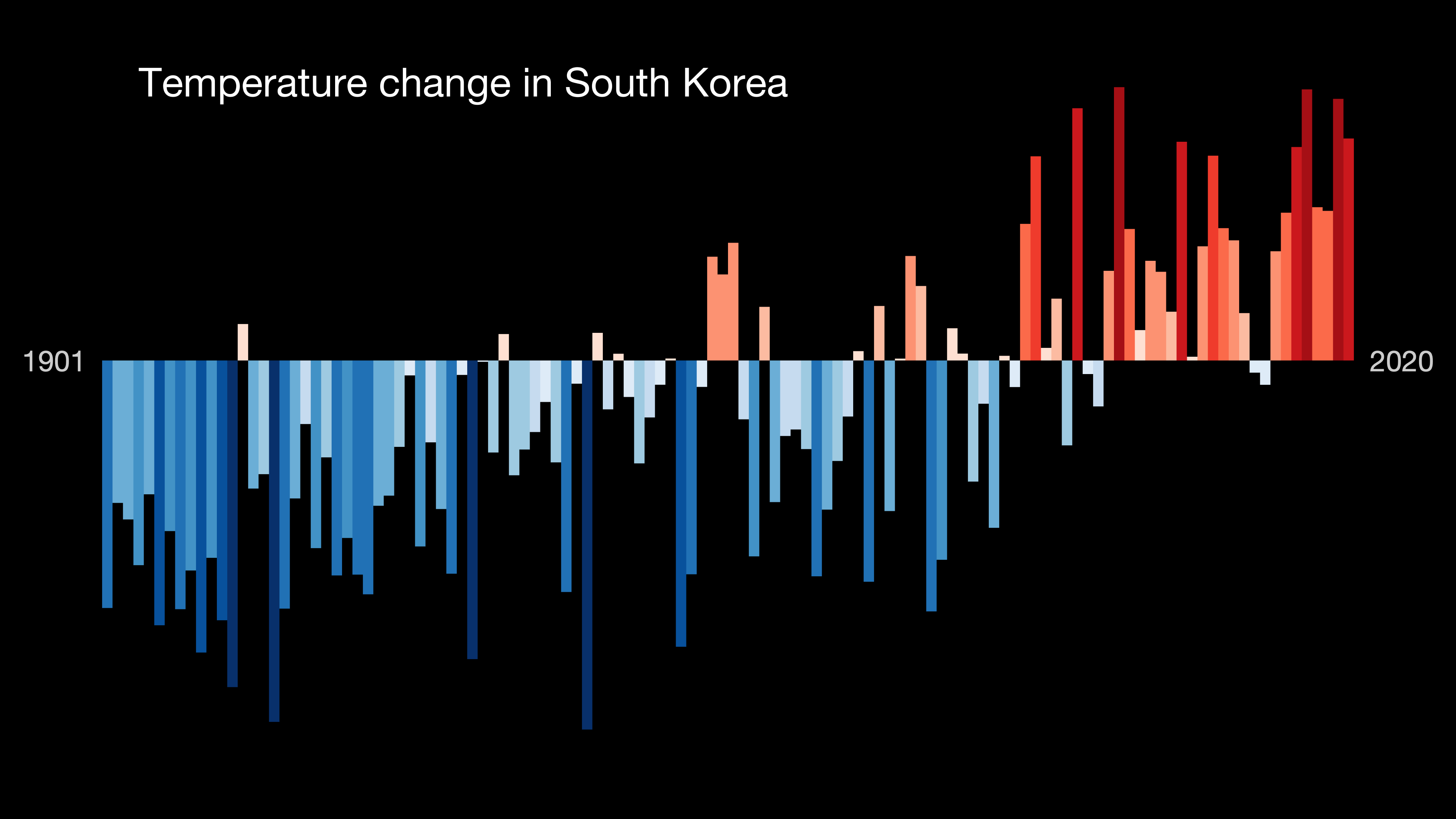
Visualisation of temperature anomaly in South Korea between 1901 and 2020.

Climate change has led to extreme weather events in South Korea that affects: social, economy, industry, culture, and many other sectors. South Korea is experiencing changes in climate parameters. Such parameters include annual temperature, rainfall amounts, and precipitation.

The most distinct climate change predicted for South Korea is an increase in the range of temperature fluctuation throughout the four seasons. The number of record minimum temperature days has decreased rapidly. The maximum precipitation during the summer has increased. The increased possibility for new types of strong weather damage evokes the seriousness and the urgency of climate change. To quickly adapt to climate change, the South Korean government began an effort to reduce greenhouse gas emissions. They are one step closer to having a low-carbon based socio-economic nation.

Industrialization and the increase in population have produced various pollutants and greenhouse gases, which are anthropogenic factors for climate change. In 2017 South Korea was the world's 7th largest emitter of carbon emissions and the 5th largest per capita.

== Greenhouse gas emissions ==
Greenhouse gas emission (especially CO_{2}) in Korea (1900~2023)

Total greenhouse gas emissions in kt of CO2 equivalent are composed of CO_{2} totals excluding short-cycle biomass burning (such as forest fires, post-burn decay, peat fires and decay of drained peatlands), all anthropogenic CH_{4} sources, N2O sources and F-gases (HFCs, PFCs and SF_{6}). The green house gas emissions of South Korea started drastically increased from the 1970s due to industrial and economical development. In 2016 was 694,479.99, and it is an increased amount 1.58% more than 2015. Also the gas emission amount was 708,429.99 and 715,500.00 in each 2017 and 2018 it increased each 1.98% and 1% more than last year. In 2019, the emission was 698,460.02, it declined 2.38% from 2018. (CO_{2} is caused by not only biomass burning such as agricultural waste burning and Savannah burning but also including other)

South Korea has among the highest carbon dioxide emissions per capita in the world.

700 million tonnes of greenhouse gases was emitted in 2019. There was a 3.5% increase in emissions of greenhouse gases after a 6.5% drop in 2020.As of 2021 Korea is funding construction of overseas coal power.

South Korea is the ninth largest emitter of carbon dioxide. Dangjin Power Station is estimated to have been the coal-fired power plant which emitted the third most carbon dioxide in 2018, at 34 million tons, and relative emissions are estimated at 1.5 kg per kWh.

=== By sector ===
	2010	2011	2012	2013	2014	2015	2016	2017	2018	2019	2020
Total amount of emissions (million ton CO_{2} equivalent)	656.1	684.8	688.0	697.3	692.1	692.6	693.7	710.6	727.0	701.2	656.2
Energy	565.7	594.7	596.0	604.5	596.9	600.3	602.2	615.6	632.6	611.6	569.9
Industry process	53.0	53.0	54.4	55.1	57.9	54.5	53.5	56.5	55.8	52.2	48.5
Agriculture	22.1	21.1	21.5	21.3	21.4	21.0	20.8	21.0	21.1	21.0	21.1
waste	15.4	16.0	16.1	16.4	15.8	16.9	17.2	17.6	17.4	16.5	16.7
Amount of greenhouse gas emissions compared to GDP (ton CO_{2} equivalent / billion)	459.9	462.9	454.2	446.2	429.1	417.7	406.4	403.6	401.2	378.5	356.7
Amount of greenhouse gas emissions per person	13.2	13.7	13.7	13.8	13.6	13.6	13.5	13.8	14.1	13.5	12.7

== Impacts on the natural environment ==
=== Temperature and weather changes ===
Köppen climate classification map for South Korea for 1980–2016

2071–2100 map under the most intense climate change scenario. Mid-range scenarios are currently considered more likely

==== Precipitation increase ====
Seoul, the capital city of South Korea, has 228 years of precipitation records, starting with traditional cheugugi rain gauges which is the longest continual instrumental rainfall collection in the world. The record of daily precipitation provides a high-resolution dataset for detecting the singularity of extreme weather events and the multiple decades of precipitation variability. Precipitation was measured with cheugugi from 1778 to 1907, and modern observation equipment was developed and has been used since 1908. Comparing the cheugugi period and the modern period, the modern period shows a significant increase in mean rainfall rate. For example, statistical data for summer precipitation at cheugugi period is 861.8 mm whereas that for the modern period mean is 946.5 mm.

As the amount of summer rainfall from 1912 to 2017 has increased by 11.6 mm/10 years, because the number of heavy rain and torrential rain events have increased in frequency, the risk of heavy rain has become much higher in the southern part of a peninsula than the central region of the Korea peninsula. A large amount of water vapour entering the southern part of the peninsula (Southern coast, Jeju Island) flows into the Yellow Sea in summer and creates a high frequency of torrential rains. On the other hand, the east coast shows a low torrential rain frequency. In addition, localized heavy rainfall during the summer months is also associated with the number of typhoons, and a clear trend of increasing frequency of typhoons affecting South Korea since the mid-1970s and mid-1990s can be observed, which leads to an increase in localized heavy rainfall. The frequency of localized heavy rainfall events with 1-hour peak precipitation of 50 millimeters or more has increased from an average of 2.4 events per year (1973~1982) to an average of 5.7 events per year(2013~2022).

However, despite the long-term trend of increasing overall summer precipitation, precipitation patterns since the mid-2010s have been different from the past. In recent years, a series of unusually low summer precipitation years have been observed. In 2015, annual precipitation was the third lowest on record, and in 2016 and 2017, August and June precipitation were the lowest and third lowest on record, respectively. In addition, the 2018 'Changma' period was the second shortest on record.

==== Changes in precipitation ====
The tropical rain belt 'Changma front' is created in the Bay of Bengal and the western North Pacific as a sub-system of the East Asian Monsoon. The northward movement of the 'Changma front' is influenced by the development of the subtropical ridge. This northward moving quasi-stationary front is called 'Changma' in South Korea, which represents the main precipitation period. The 'Changma front' takes about 4 to 5 weeks to go through the Korea Peninsula. This slow movement results in a large, but steady, amount of summer rainfall over the entire Korea Peninsula in late June and July each year. However, in recent years, since the 2000s, 'Changma' precipitation has tended to start a little later and end a little later, with a secondary precipitation peak in early August after the 'Changma' period. In particular, since the 2010s, rainfall during the 'Changma' period has been decreasing, while localized heavy rainfalls of 30 millimeters or more per hour have been increasing. Furthermore, due to climate change, 'Changma' precipitation is predicted to increase in the future and become more intense. Specifically, 'Changma' precipitation has been predicted to increase by up to 5% in the near future (2020–2039) and up to 25% by the end of the 21st century (2080–2099).

Another, late summer 'Changma' precipitation event known as the 'Fall Changma' or 'Second Changma' has been recognised by authors since 2016. Since the 1970s, the duration and rainfall of the 'Fall Changma' has increased, possibly associated with climate warming. The 'Fall Changma' starts normally in late August to early September. It occurs when a 'Changma front' that has moved up toward China collides with Siberian high pressure and passes over the Korea Peninsula. The amount of rainfall and number of rainy days in the 'Fall Changma' period is generally lower than when the front moves north in early summer. Rainfall is also very erratic from year to year. However, on occasion, torrential downpours and tropical cyclones (typhoons) can occur, damaging crops as they reach maturity.

==== Temperature increases ====
Since 1999, the Korea Global Atmosphere Watch Center located at Anmyeon-do has been monitoring major greenhouse gasses (GHG) such as carbon dioxide (CO_{2}), methane (CH_{4}), nitrous oxide (N_{2}O), and chlorofluorocarbons (CFC-11 and CFC-12). The Anyone-do station is located in a relatively pollution-free environment, an ideal site for observing the background atmosphere of Northeast Asia, including the Korean Peninsula.

Among these GHG, CO_{2} acts most to change many aspects of the climate factors. The CO_{2} concentrations at Anmyeon-do are substantially higher than the global average; the average CO_{2} concentration for 2018 was recorded as 415.2 ppm. It is an increase of 44 ppm (6.7%) relative to the annual average of 371.2 ppm for 1999 when carbon dioxide concentrations were first observed in the Anmyeon-do. And it is 7.4 ppm higher than the global average of 407.8 ppm for the same year as documented by WMO. The annual growth rate of CO_{2} for the 10 years(2008~2018) was 2.4 ppm/year, which was higher than the global average of 2.2 ppm/year.

Methane, another prominent greenhouse gas in the Korean Peninsula's atmosphere, also shows a clear increase in atmospheric concentration over the decade from 2008 to 2018. The 2018 annual average concentration of methane observed in the Anmyeon-do was 1974 ppb, which is 115 ppb higher than the global average and 100 ppb higher than the Northern Hemisphere Mauna Loa average of 1874 ppb. The 2018 methane concentration in the Anmyeon-do is 113 ppb higher than in 1999, when observations first began.

During the industrialization era (second industrial revolution) over the past few decades, people have been burning fossil fuels (coal, oil, gasoline, natural gas). This releases CO_{2} into the atmosphere which contributes the greenhouse effect. A sharp temperature contrast is shown between the urban and rural areas due to this industrialization. The mean temperatures data variations observed at ten meteorological stations in South Korea show an annual mean temperature increase at a rate of 0.52 °C per decade. During the last 29 years, the increase in the annual mean temperature was 1.5 °C for the Seoul station (found in an urban area) and 0.6 °C for the rural and seashore stations. These rate differences are significantly larger over urbanized areas.

South Korea is experiencing a rapid temperature increase. Higher daily maximum and minimum temperatures are very likely to increase in East Asia. There are more severe warm extremes, but less severe cold extremes. These mean temperature increases, especially the temperature increase rate after the 1950s is 1.5 times higher than before the 1950s. In the absence of greenhouse gas mitigation efforts (RCP8.5 scenario), between 2071 and 2100, winters are projected to be about 40 days shorter and summers about 40 days longer than in the most recent decade (2009–2018). When average temperature comparison for comparing 20th-century and 21st-century temperature averages, it is shown that there is a 4 °C increase. The mean yearly temperature for South Korea is 10~15 °C, which means that future warming will result in the expansion of a subtropical climate zone with average temperatures above 27 °C on the Korean Peninsula. The recent subtropical zone is located on the lower seaside of the Korea Peninsula, but as accelerated temperatures increase, it will result in the subtropical zone move migrating northward. Therefore, by 2100 the subtropical zone is projected to expand its region to the north end of Taebaek Mountains.

=== Extreme weather events ===
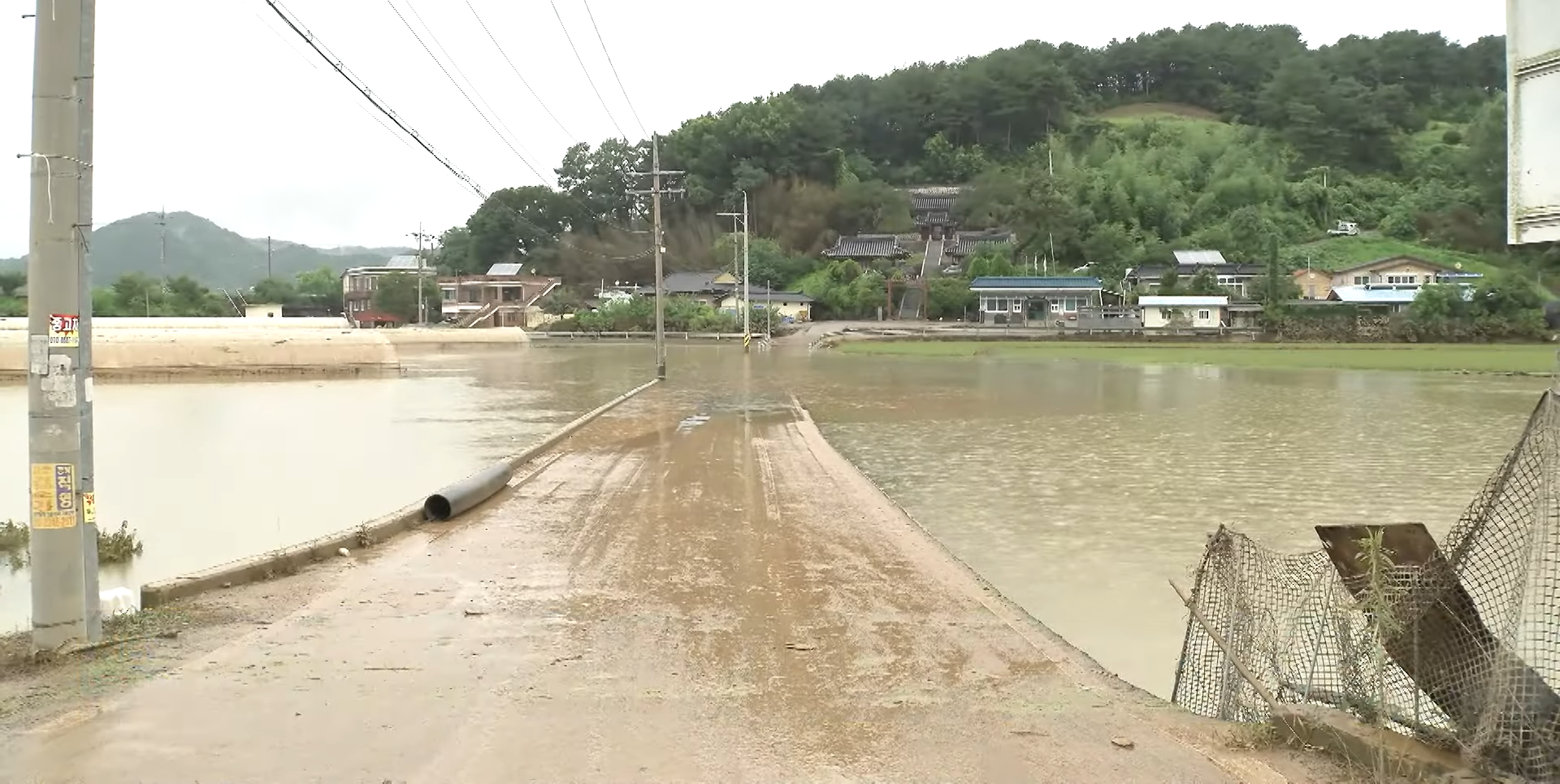
2023 South Korea floods

South Korea has been affected by climate change. Increase of flooding and typhoon, and damage from them is significant in recent few decades. The damage to property and loss of lives caused by natural disasters is a typical impact of climate change. Because of this point, decreasing the natural disaster is one of the goals for nations adapting to climate change. Increases in the frequency of flooding, typhoons, or hurricane intensity results in a steady increase of the number of large-scale natural disasters. South Korea is not an exception. Especially, damage from flooding and typhoon is significant. Despite the increasing threat, the vulnerability to natural disaster, especially typhoon, has been decreased possibly due to multiple factors, such as, improved disaster prevention, changed building codes, industrial structures, and land use.

==== Typhoons ====
There are about 25 typhoons every year in the northwest Pacific Ocean, and on average, three to four typhoons directly or indirectly affect the Korean Peninsula. When we divide the typhoons that affected the Korean Peninsula from 1977 to 2012 into two periods, we can see that the frequency and intensity of typhoons have recently increased, and the point of occurrence of typhoons has shifted westward and the turning position has shifted north. This is related to the weakening of vertical wind shear around the Korean Peninsula, the westward movement of high pressure in the Northwest Pacific Ocean, and the rising of sea temperature around the Korean Peninsula.

==== Heat waves ====
The Korea Meteorological Administration's heat wave standard is defined as a case where the daily maximum temperature of 33 °C or higher lasts for more than two days. The rise in global average temperatures, which has been accelerating since the 2010s, is increasing the frequency and intensity of heat waves throughout the world. In South Korea, too, heat waves have been frequent recently, including 2013, 2016, and 2018. In addition, the intensity of heat waves is increasing, breaking the highest record of daily high of 41 °C per day in Hongcheon and daily low of 30.3 °C per day in Seoul in 2018. Heat waves mainly occur inland in Gyeongsang-do and Jeolla-do. However, in August 2026, Yangsan recorded 42.5 °C, the highest temperature measured in South Korea since national weather observations began in 1904.

Among the weather variables, heat waves were more correlated with cloudiness than precipitation. There is a negative correlation between cloudiness and heat wave throughout the summer. Recently, local and global causes of heat waves have been actively studied. However, in order to effectively predict when, where, and how long and how strong a heat wave will last, we need to study the mechanisms for heat wave occurrence and maintenance in more detail.

==== Droughts ====
Drought is one of the weather disasters that causes enormous damage to areas that greatly affect the national economy and people's lives, such as agriculture, forests, and livestock. Since most of the annual precipitation in South Korea is concentrated in summer, drought occurs frequently in winter and spring when precipitation is relatively insufficient. From 1980 to 2015, the SPI-12 (drought index calculated from 12-month accumulated precipitation) was calculated from rainfall observation at 55 locations on the Korean Peninsula and the rate of change was calculated to confirm that the severity of drought increased statistically significantly in the northeastern coast of South Korea. And also it confirm that the frequency of drought increased in late winter, early spring, and that early fall, and the frequency of drought decreased in summer. Due to the recent rapid climate change, precipitation increases in summer, but there is no change or decrease in precipitation except for summer, while temperature increases not only in summer but also throughout the entire season. Thus, the risk of drought may increase in seasons other than summer due to a decrease in precipitation and an increase in air moisture requirement due to rising temperatures. In particular, in July–August 2018, when a high temperature phenomenon occurred nationwide, drought occurred due to an increase in evaporation on the ground due to a high temperature phenomenon.

==== Asian dust ====
Yellow dust is a phenomenon in which small sand, dust, or loess flies far away in the upper wind from deserts and loess areas in central Asia such as China and Mongolia. These airborne particulates are transported not only to Russia, Korea, and Japan, but also sometimes to the east of the United States, causing serious health problems. Yellow dust mainly affects Korea in spring. Recently, however, climate change has caused changes in the yellow dust phenomenon. As the temperature rose due to climate change, less snow piled up in the Gobi Desert and the Inner Mongolia Plateau, making it easier for yellow dust to occur when the wind blows, and sandstorms occur more frequently. Therefore, the timing and frequency of yellow dust increased, and the occurrence of yellow dust in autumn and winter increased.

==== Sea level rise ====
In the seas around the Korean Peninsula, sea levels have risen by about 10 cm over the past 40 years, and the rate of increase is 2.9 mm, which is somewhat higher than the global average every year. By region, the area near Jeju was the highest with an increase of 4.44 mm, with the east coast increasing by 3.70 mm, the south coast by 2.41 mm, and the west coast by 2.07 mm. According to the RCP 2.6/4.5/6.0/8.5 scenario, Korea's average sea level is expected to rise 37.8, 48.1, 47.7, and 65.0 cm at the end of the 21st century, respectively. In particular, in all scenarios, the southern coastal region is expected to have a higher degree of sea level rise than other regions, and the western coastal region is expected to have a lower degree of sea level rise than other regions.

The ecosystem affected by rising sea levels is the coastal ecosystem. The coast has a unique ecosystem as the boundary between land and the sea, and a wide variety of species inhabit and high productivity is maintained, performing a biologically important function. However, the coast is vulnerable to climate change because it is directly affected by rising sea levels, which is the most direct change in climate change, such as an increase in the risk of erosion and flooding. In particular, as Korea is surrounded by the sea on three sides, the damage to the coastal ecosystem will be great due to climate change and rising sea levels.

== Impacts on people ==
Due to warming, the Earth's temperature has risen by nearly 1 degree Celsius compared to before industrialization. We are already feeling the effects of climate change. Heat waves will occur more often and longer, and weather anomalies will occur more strongly and more often in various regions. Sea levels and water temperatures around the world will rise, and acidification will continue. This phenomenon still has a tremendous impact on human life and will continue to do so. More frequent extreme weather with global warming by IPCC

More frequent extreme weather with global warming by IPCC

The Intergovernmental Panel on Climate Change, an international organization that scientifically studies climate change, made it clear that climate change is an urgent problem to be solved in October 2018. The IPCC warned that in order to prevent the catastrophe of climate change, the average global temperature should not increase by more than 1.5 degrees Celsius compared to pre-industrialization.

Climate change has a tremendous impact on the well-being of mankind as well as the environment. It threatens the survival of mankind while adversely affecting the rights of life, health, food, water, housing, and livelihood. Climate change can affect to life, health, housing, water and sanitation, mental health, economic now and in the future.

=== Daily living ===
We all have the right to enjoy the highest levels of physical and mental health that can be reached. According to the IPCC, climate change increases the risk of injury, disease, and death from heat waves and fires. It increases additionally the risk of malnutrition due to reduced food production in low-income areas, diseases spread through food, water, and other media. Also, due to climate change, children who are exposed to shocking events due to worsening natural disasters suffer from post-traumatic stress disorder.

Climate change threatens housing rights, the right to live at an appropriate level for themselves and their families in various ways. Severe natural disasters such as floods and forest fires are destroying people's homes and causing victims. Droughts, landslides and floods can change the natural environment, and rising sea levels threaten millions of people living in low-lying areas.

Climate change continues to affect the quality and amount of water resources, as can be seen in temperature rise, sea ice, and sea level rise. More than a billion people are already in a situation where clean water is not available. And the situation will worsen, which will have a huge impact on hygiene and health. Severe natural disasters such as cyclones and floods can also affect water resources and water and sewage facilities. It contributes to the spread of contaminated water and waterborne diseases.

There are people who are more sensitive to the effects of climate change. In other words, children, chronically ill, the elderly, people with cognitive deficits, pregnant women, and people with psychopathological disorders are sensitive to climate change.

The effects of climate change are direct and indirect and can be short- and long-term. The effects may appear a little later and include disorders such as post-traumatic stress. It can even be transmitted to later generations (Cianconi, Betro, and Janiri, 2020).

Extreme weather phenomena such as heat, humidity, drought, forest fires, and floods has affected mental health, including psychological disorders, deterioration of the health of people diagnosed with certain mental illnesses. And it increased psychiatric hospitalization and suicide rates.

It is concluded that climate change is likely to affect mental health not only directly, but also indirectly, such as poverty, unemployment, and homelessness.

It is suggested that 25–50% of victims of natural disasters suffered from mental health problems. In addition, more than 54% of adults and more than 45% of children were seriously threatened with mental health, and insomnia, hypersensitivity, increased drug use, and depression were observed.

These immediate mental illnesses can usually persist. It is more evident in people who hide their trauma and don't ask for help. And it greatly influences their mental health.

Mental health can suffer not only from natural disasters, but also from gradual changes or pollution that the Earth experiences. It has shown that droughts, floods, rising sea levels, rising ambient temperatures, and other climate changes can indirectly increase psychological distress, including stress from economic and other conditions, social capital decline, and trauma events. In addition, It said that rising temperatures are associated with increased risk of death from exhaustion, assault, injury, and suicide. And also have suggested a link between extreme heat and increased sensitivity, aggression, and even violence.

When a person becomes uncomfortable hot, the possibility of temper tantrums, hypersensitivity, physical aggression and violence increases.

In fact, cities and regions with high temperatures tend to have more frequent violent crimes than cold areas. The same is true even after considering socio-cultural factors such as age, race, poverty, and culture (Plante and Anderson, 2017).

The tendency to increase crime and violence during the hot summer suggests a link between aggressive behavior and temperature (Haertzen et al.; Cohen et al., 2004).

=== Economic ===
Infrastructure and property damage: extreme weather events such as hurricanes, floods, and wildfires can damage buildings, roads, and other infrastructure, resulting in high repair costs.

In agriculture, changes in temperature and precipitation patterns can affect crop yields, which can affect food prices and availability.

In tourism, Climate change can destroy the characteristics of certain destinations for tourists and affect the tourism industry.

For health, Climate change can lead to an increase in heat-related diseases and the spread of diseases such as malaria and dengue, putting a strain on the healthcare system

For water resources, Changes in the availability of water due to droughts or floods can affect various industries, such as agriculture and energy production.

In insurance, as the frequency and severity of natural disasters increase, insurance premiums for companies and individuals may increase.

The fishing industry in South Korea has been impacted by warming waters, which are leading to traditional catch species migrating to other waters, and possibly in more dangerous weather.

== Biological effect of climate change ==
As a report published by ministry of environment said, because the studies on observed impact are limited in expanding the correlation and they were analyzed based on specific ecosystems and plant species, continuous long-term studies on various species and research topics are required. But about animal ecological effect of climate change, many studies have been already conducted.

Regarding to plant habitat, the onset period has risen by an average of 2.7 days/10 years from 1970 to 2013, and the time of leaf abscission has increased by 1.4 days/10 years. This means that the typical growth period has increased due to global warming. Also, with respect to plant distribution, the proportions of northern plants, such as subalpine species, and rare endemic plants have increased along with their altitudes, whereas the diversity of species was shown to decrease.

Reportedly, the distribution of animals became wider in the north, in which an inflow of new southern species was evident. This spread was also clearly demonstrated on a national scale for exotic species, such as Vespa velutina and Ricania shantungensis, and pest, including mosquitoes and ticks.

For the future projection of the climate effect on ecosystem by models, flowering time of some target species was predicted to decrease. For example, it is estimated that the flowering of cherry blossoms are 6.3 days and 11.2 days earlier after 2090, according to the future climate scenario RCP4.5 and RCP8.5.

In addition, through the studies on changes in habitat distribution and animal richness after 2050 according to different climate scenarios based on current distribution data, it was shown that habitat reduction due to climate change would most affect endangered species.

== Mitigation and adaptation ==
=== Carbon trading ===
According to icap, The Korea Emissions Trading Scheme (K-ETS) started in 2015 as an East Asia's first national-wide, mandatory flamework, and this policy covers 74% South Korea's national Greenhouse Gas emissions. This will help to become carbon neutral by 2050 which embedded in the "Carbon Neutral Frame Act" of 2021. 684 of the Korea's largest emitters in the power, buildings, waste, transport and domestic aviation sectors are covered by the K-ETS, and minimally 10% of allowance must be auctioned. The government also aims to achieve a target of 40% renewable power by 2034 and the replacement of some coal capacity with liquefied natural gas. The South Korean president Moon Jae in pledged in September 2020 that South Korea would be carbon free in 2050. 2030 goal is almost a quarter reduction from 2017 levels.

=== Green New Deal ===
The Korean Green New Deal was announced on 14 July 2020.

Investment directly related to energy will be 73.4 trillion won. People in South Korea pursue eco-friendly infrastructure like remodeling of public buildings and renewable energy production such as building smart grids.

As investments non directly related to energy, 58.2 trillion won will be invested in digital economy initiatives. A new Korean Government IT strategy project was projected to have a 20% increase in green IT and IT product by 2012 by the Ministry of Knowledge and Economy. Meanwhile, the Ministry of Public Administration and Security have already started a computational center for green energy-saving and have formulated a comprehensive plan to promote the 'energy-saving'. Through professional organizations comprehensive energy-saving, environmental protection, and budget savings procedures are in progress for energy diagnostic purposes. In addition to what has already been discussed the plan for idle shut-off, demolition equipment, and main contents as 'a green-based computational center for environmental improvement plans' will also go ahead as scheduled.

=== Energy transition ===
The South Korean Ministry of Trade, Industry, and Energy (MOTIE) has claimed that an energy transition is necessary in order to comply with the public's demands for their lives, their safety, and the environment. In addition, the ministry has stated that the direction of the future energy policy is "to transition (from conventional energy sources) to safe and clean energy sources." Unlike in the past, the keynote of the policy is to put emphasis on safety and the environment rather than on stability of supply and demand and economic feasibility and is to shift its reliance on nuclear power and coal to clean energy sources like renewables.

Progress in the Korean energy transition: policies and plans
Title	Date	Contents
Energy Transition Road Map	October 2017	· policy direction of a gradual nuclear phase-out · cancellation of plans for new nuclear reactors, no extension of lifespan of old reactors
Renewable Energy 3020 Plan	December 2017	· measures to improve renewables deployment in order to raise its share in the power generation to 20% by 2030(7.6% as of 2017)
The 8th Basic Plan for Long-term Electricity Supply and Demand	December 2017	· configuration measures for power facilities with improved environmental and safety performances by 2030
Energy Transition(Nuclear) Complementary Measure	May 2018	· follow-up and complementary measures for the neighboring areas (industry, human resources) in the process of a gradual phase-out
Solutions to Side Effects of Solar and Wind Energy	June 2018	· solutions to side effects such as environmental damage, NIMBY, real estate speculation, consumer damage, etc.
Hydrogen Economy Road Map	January 2019	· development of hydrogen industry ecosystem with hydrogen vehicles and fuel cells
Reinforcement of Renewable Energy Competitiveness	April 2019	· laying the groundwork for domestic renewable industry and strengthening its global competitiveness
The Third Energy Master Plan	June 2019	· a mid- and long-term vision of energy transition with respect to energy generation, distribution, consumption, industry, etc.
The National Plan for Energy Efficiency Innovation	June 2019	· a mid- and long-term plan to innovate the energy consumption structure by 2030
The 9th Basic Plan for Long-term Electricity Supply and Demand	TBA	TBA
The 5th National Basic Plan for New and Renewable Energy	TBA	TBA

In 1981, the primary energy was sourced predominantly by oil and coal with oil accounting for 58.1% and coal 33.3%. As the shares of nuclear power and liquefied natural gas have increased over the years, the share of oil has decreased gradually. The primary energy broke down as follows in 1990: 54% oil, 26% coal, 14% nuclear power, 3% liquefied natural gas, and 3% renewables. Later on, with efforts to reduce greenhouse gas emissions in the country through international cooperation and to improve environmental and safety performances, it broke down as follows in 2017: 40% oil, 29% coal, 16% liquefied natural gas, 10% nuclear power, and 5% renewables. Under the 8th Basic Plan for Long-term Electricity Supply and Demand, presented at the end of 2017, the shares of nuclear and coal are getting decreased while the share of renewables is expanding.

In June 2019, the Korean government confirmed the Third Energy Master Plan, also called a constitutional law of the energy sector and renewed every five years. Its goal is to achieve sustainable growth and enhance the quality of life through energy transition. There are five major tasks to achieve this goal. First, with regards to consumption, the goal is to improve energy consumption efficiency by 38% compared to the level of 2017 and to reduce energy consumption by 18.6% below the BAU level by 2040. Second, with respect to generation, the task is to bring a transition towards a safe and clean energy mix by raising the share of renewable energy in power generation (30~35% by 2040) and by implementing a gradual phase-out of nuclear power and a drastic reduction of coal. Third, regarding the systems, the task is to raise the share of distributed generation nearby where demand is created with renewables and fuel cells and to enhance the roles and responsibility of local governments and residents. Fourth, with regards to the industry, the task is to foster businesses related to renewables, hydrogen, and energy efficiency as a future energy industry, to help the conventional energy industry develop higher value-added businesses, and to support the nuclear power industry to maintain its main ecosystem. The fifth task is to improve the energy market system of electricity, gas, and heat in order to promote energy transition and is to develop an energy big data platform in order to create new businesses.

=== Adaptation ===
Amid major flooding in 2023, President Yoon Suk Yeol proposed the country overhaul its disaster preparedness as climate change causes more frequent extreme weather events.

=== Education ===
The Republic of Korea has a number of policies and initiatives supporting environmental education. In 2008, the Environmental Education Promotion Act encouraged the development of environmental education. It aimed to raise national environmental awareness, to encourage people to develop research and inquiry skills, and to put what they learn into action.

The Ministry of Environment, in its 2011-2015 Environmental Education Master Plan, proposed a policy agenda for environmental education to be implemented through formal education, social environmental education and educational infrastructure approaches. The various approaches in the formal education area include:

- 'Environment and Green Growth' as an elective subject in middle and high school curricula, and classes in elementary school designed to integrate environmental education;
- the establishment of the Natural Environmental Studies Institute that offers interactive youth programmes for environmental studies;
- Environment Model Schools, designed to demonstrate best-practice;
- 'Low Carbon Challenge' involving ten universities;
- in-service training for teachers to upskill, specializing in environmental education.

== See also ==
- East Asia Climate Partnership
- Energy in South Korea
- Environmental issues in South Korea
- Environmental policy of South Korea
- Climate change in North Korea
- Plug-in electric vehicles in South Korea
