= Environmental issues in Korea =

Environmental issues in Korea may refer to:

- Air pollution in South Korea
- Climate change in South Korea
- Environment of Korea
- Environment of North Korea
- Environment of South Korea
- Pollution in Korea
