= Bongjungnori =

Korean traditional game

Bongjungnori (Korean: 봉죽놀이) is a traditional Korean game in fishing villages played on the 14th day of the New Year. It is a collective dance game that is woven with sound and dance while praying for a big catch.

In the morning, sailors gather at the playground. When the drummer and the Gugwari catch the beat, the leader stands in the middle and makes a sound, signalling the sailors to respond. People dance with excitement as the sound of the song and the rhythm of the choruses harmonize. After a rest, people perform various songs, as well as gopsa dance and bracken dance.

Bongjungnori usually lasts about a week. In Hwanghae Province and some areas of Gyeonggi Province, catching a lot of fish indicates that they have received bongjuk. It is widely practised in Pyeongan-do, Hwanghae-do, Gyeonggi-do, Yeonpyeong-do, Cheonsu-man, and Anmyeon-do.

This game is deeply related to early catching on the west coast. The purpose of the game is to pray before the god General Im Gyeong-eop, to keep the boat safe and catch a lot of fish.

== Bonjuk ==
Bongjuk refers to a flag wrapped in straw in the middle of a long bamboo pole, and a paper flower and five-coloured flags. The flag is attached to a 2 – 3 meter-long bamboo pole, split into several parts and decorated with artificial flowers. To make a bongjuk using bamboo, straw, and paper, or clothes requires ten to twenty people.

== History ==
Bongjungnori and its dance was inspired by seaside people and their livelihood has different names in different regions. It is said to have originated from the superstitious custom of keeping virgins in the sea. This was done under the excuse of guaranteeing the safety and prosperity of sailing. The sea spirit received a maiden as an offering every year. In modern times this was replaced by a scarecrow stored in seawater.

Bongjungnori reflects a strong tie with croaker fishing. Boats with a bongjuk were often witnessed during the croaker season. The ships that caught an abundance of croakers used to return to a port with a hoisted bongjuk while playing instruments. The height of the flag could indicate the catch of the day. When the flag hung high, the haul was of a little amount, while the flag's lower positioning would indicate a more successful catch.

== Rituals ==
Bongjungnori has two ritualistic elements, primarily in the west coast region. One of the rituals involves people rejoicing and playing instruments when a boat with bountiful fish returns to the port. The other involves people participating in this tradition relating to the other rituals of the village.

As per common belief, the dance musters courage and boldness within the fishermen. Villages of Hwangdo, in South Chungcheong Province, gather together under their dangsan tree (sacred guardian tree) to hold a ritual on the 15th of the first lunar month. They wish for a rich harvest of fish. Residents held a bongjuk (or a bunggi, per their regional dialect), and dance while rendering a traditional Korean song called Bunggi Taryeong. In general, bongjungnori is a custom blending dancing and singing with Bongjuk Taryeong as the main song.

During bongjungnori, all participants dance spontaneously to the rhythm of the farmers' music as the dance has no definite form.
