= Dongbok Dam =

- Location within South Korea
- Country: South Korea
- Location: Hwasun County
- Coordinates: 35.08°N 127.1°E
- Status: Operational
- Construction began: 1969
- Opening date: 1971
- Owner: Gwangju City Waterworks

Dam and spillways
- Type of dam: concrete-lined rockfill
- Impounds: Dongbok cheon, or Tongbek-ch'on
- Height: 45.5 m (149 ft)
- Length: 202 m (663 ft)

Reservoir
- Surface area: 6.6 km²

The Dongbok Dam is a water supply dam in South Korea. It is also transliterated into English as Dongbog Dam or Dongbogdaem. The dam provides municipal and industrial water supply to nearby city of Gwangju.

It drains an area of 190 km^{2} in Hwasun County. The dam was renovated in 1985 in response to increased water demand for Gwangju city.

In late 2022, water levels in Dongbok Lake were very low due to drought.

In the summer of 2023, high water levels in Dongbok Lake raised concerns for downstream flooding. See 2023 South Korea floods.

Residents have called for redesign of the dam to increase its flood control capacity.
