= Recycling in South Korea =

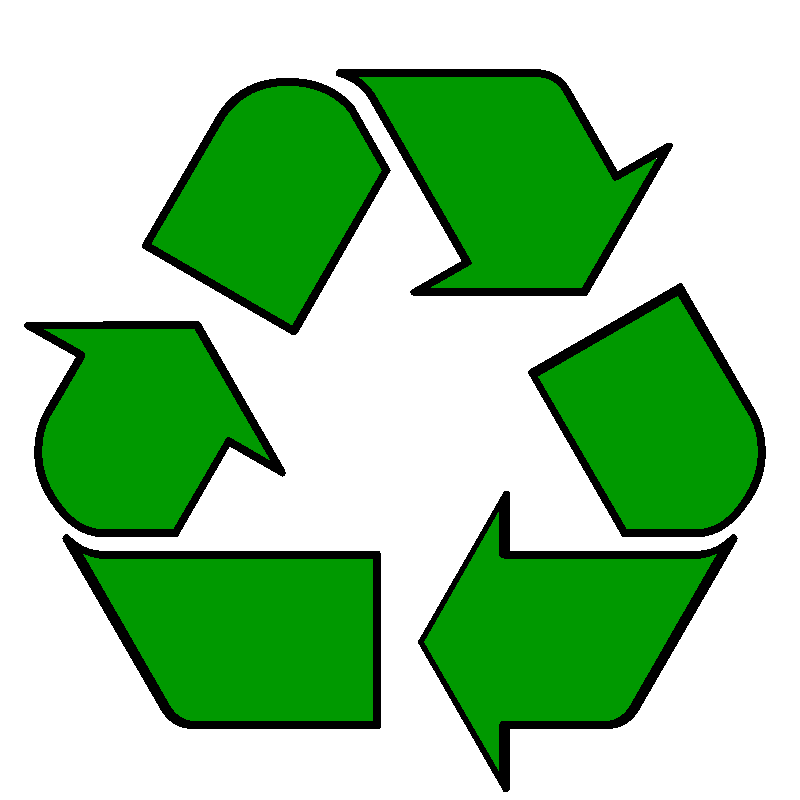
Recycling symbol

South Korean waste disposal policy (known as "jongnyangje") operates under the Ministry of Environment. Waste is required to be separated into four parts: landfill waste, organic waste, recyclable waste, and large waste items. Recyclable waste such as: paper, plastics and glass, should be separated before disposal. Fines are applicable to violations of the policy.

== Circular economy in South Korea ==
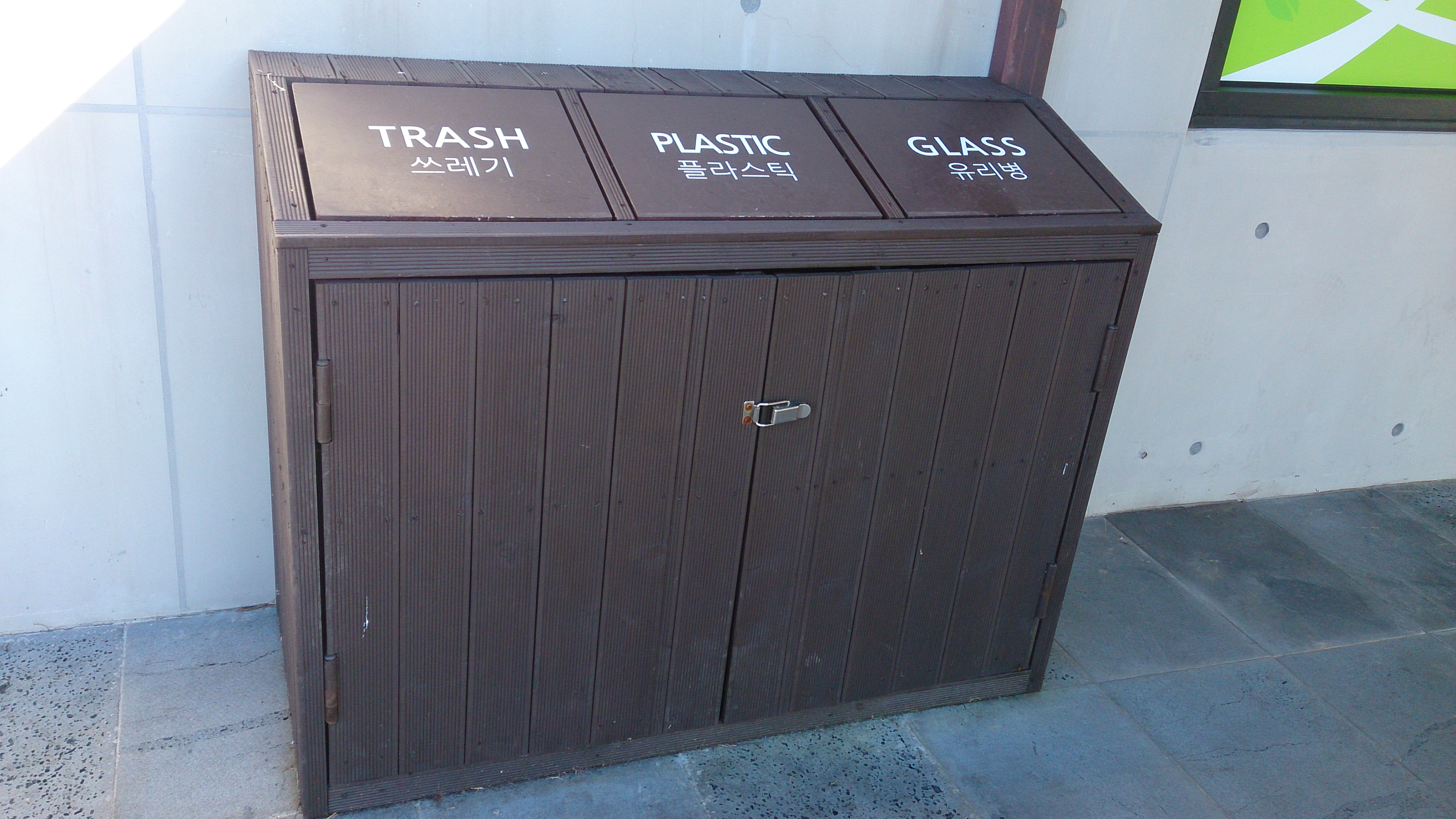
Recycling bins in Jeju Province

A Circular economy is one which minimizes waste and makes the most of resources. It means "a production and consumption model which involves reusing, repairing, refurbishing and recycling existing materials and products to keep materials within the economy whenever possible", while also considering waste as a resource, "minimizing the actual amount of waste". South Korea was ranked as the second highest recycling country among the OECD countries, at a rate of 59% in 2013.

On January 1, 2018, the Ministry of Environment announced that they would enact the "Basic Law on the Resource Circulation". The law includes systems for resource recycling, recycling performance management, evaluation of product cycle utilization, and set waste disposal fees. The 'resource recycling performance management system' is applied to businesses that discharge over 100 tons of designated waste per year or over 1,000 tons of other waste. If the producer has difficulty in implementing such a recycling system, a 'circulation availability assessment system' will be introduced. Every three years, evaluation plans will be established and results for particular businesses revealed on the internet. The waste disposal fees of 10 ~ 30 won/kg of landfill or incinerated waste are charged to the municipalities and businesses unless they are 'recyclable resources' which are not environmentally harmful.

The government of South Korea provided data regarding a large decline in the amount of waste generated in a day by households from 1.3kg in 1994 to 0.94kg in 2013. The buried waste rate fell from 81.2 per cent to 9.6 per cent; burned waste fell from 15.3 per cent to 6.4 per cent, and recycled waste grew from 15.3 percent to 83.2 percent from the year of 1994 to 2013. This enabled South Korea to accelerate economic growth by saving money.

Previously, coated paper (such as in cups) couldn't be recycled due to the presence of polyethylene (PE) on the surface of the paper. However, Repaper, a venture company in South Korea, developed and marketed recyclable coated cups by using the component of acrylate instead of PE. This advancement in methods has been shared not only with South Korea but with Europe and United States also.

== Food waste in South Korea ==
One of the largest sources of food waste are small dishes known as Banchan (반찬). South Korea creates food wastage over 130 kilograms per person every year.

From 1995, the country separated the food waste collection system from households in order to decrease the amount of food waste going to landfill. The system requires households to purchase particular garbage bags to throw general waste separately from food waste. Response to this initiative was lukewarm, as a high rate of separation of food was not achieved.

According to the Ministry of Environment in 2005, total food waste created was about 13,000 ton per day. This is approximately over 27% of the municipal solid waste total. Food waste in South Korea has a higher moisture content than in other countries due to the nature of national cuisine; this presents serious threats to groundwater and soil contamination in landfill. It also has high salinity and low pH. Greenhouse gases are produced during decomposition, and therefore landfills would require gas collection facilities. Since 2005 food waste going to landfill has been prohibited in South Korea and a food waste recycling system was implemented. Food waste is now turned into feed-stock for animals and fertilizers. However, ocean water can be affected by the disposal of Food Waste Leachate (FWL), and at the same time organic load in plants increases as sewage treatment plants usually discharge to the sea. Disposal of organic waste to the ocean has been banned since 2012.

The country has implemented other measures, such as smart bins that can measure the weight of food wastage through Radio Frequency Identification (RFID). According to its weight, citizens are charged through their identification cards. 47,000 tonnes of food were reduced in 6 years. 6,000 of these smart bins are placed in Seoul.

The South Korean population readily embraced these measures, and actively participate in said programs. The food waste recycling rate was 2% in 1995; since 2013 food waste recycled through biodegradable bags has been mandatory, and fees collected from payment for the bags are reinvested into recycling food waste. South Korea's food waste recycling rate grew to 95%.

=== Process ===
Solid food waste goes through a crusher then a crusher and screen. It is passed to a screw press then dryer, composter, curing facility, and finally moved to storage or turned into fertilizer. The liquid food waste is processed in a different way than solid food waste. The FWL is applied to food waste in the aforementioned step to turn the mixture into fertilizer. Leachate is processed by 99.9 tonnes a day by the two Korean facilities that control 130 tonnes of food waste in total every day.

== E-waste in South Korea ==
The Law for Promotion of Resources Saving and Reutilization (LRSR) was enacted in 1992 by the recycling management of South Korea. However, the system termed Producer Deposit-Refund (PDR) actually managed e-waste. The PDR system ran from 1992 to 2002, and was meant to increase the economic responsibility of manufacturers to promote e-waste recycling. It involved the Korea Recycling Corporation (KORECO), Ministry of Environment (MOE), and producers. The MOE received prepaid deposits from manufacturers corresponding to their outputs for the previous year - this sum was meant to cover the costs of recycling said outputs. The actual recycling costs were higher than the prepaid deposit which resulted in manufacturers choosing to make prepaid deposits instead of actually striving to recycle the e-waste. Some argue its method of recycling e-waste through municipalities was inappropriate.

As South Korea joined the OECD in 1996, recycling strategies were developed in the line of OECD publications and other developed countries. The South Korean government enacted laws in 2003 wherein consumer electronics manufacturers were made fully responsible for the recycling of end-of-life (EOL) goods. When not able to fulfill their recycling quotas, they are charged. This is known as a Producer Recycling (PR) system. Every appliance (e.g. televisions or computers) has specific recycling goals set between 55-70% in relation to its weight. There are three types of methods which producers can choose to achieve the goal. The first method is producers creating their individual techniques and systems of recycling. The second method consists of outsourcing the recycling process. Lastly, a third method exists wherein manufacturers can join the Producer Responsibility Organization (PRO), which in turn completes the recycling process for them. A 2 year trial period was set to initiate the PR system in June 2000 by the MOE; 3 large companies chose to join the project voluntarily: Samsung, Daewoo and LG. During the trial producers were ordered to build recycling facilities in lieu of making monetary contributions. This initiative saw the construction of the Asan Recycling center in 1988 by Samsung, Chilseo Recycling center in 2001 by LG, and the Metropolitan Electronics Recycling Center in 2003.

A report by the MOE in 2003 showed that e-waste increased as South Korea's economy grew. Many home appliances are recyclable and those materials can be used to create other products. About 40% of e-waste is collected at a local government level, while about 50 percent is collected at companies' logistic centers, the rest being from second hand goods centers and dealers. The report stated that from collected waste home appliances 12% of them were reused, 69% were recycled and 19% were taken into incineration and landfill.

== Plastic waste ==
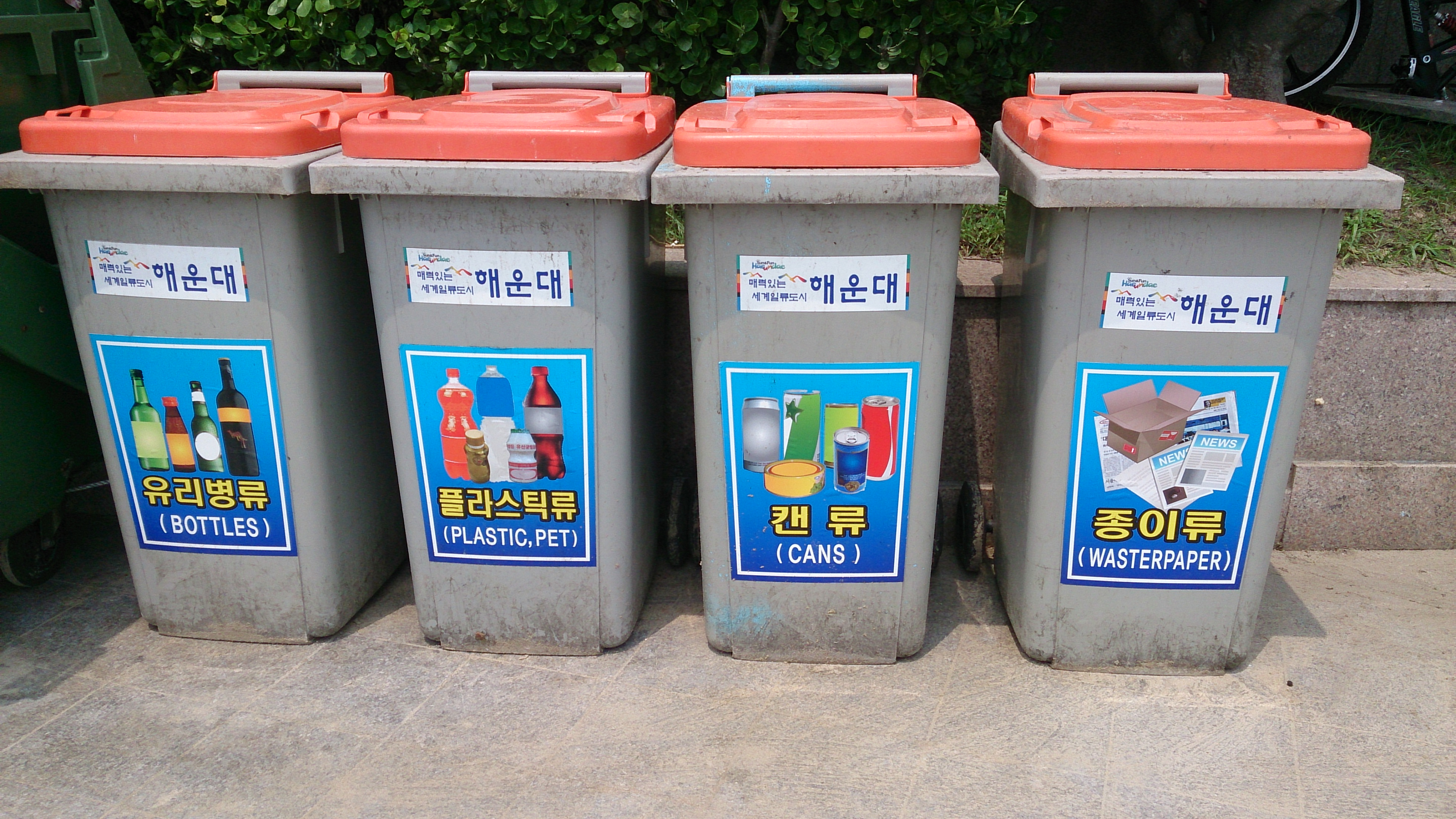
Recycling bins in Haeundae Beach in Busan. From left, glass bottles, plastic, cans, paper

China was the largest reusable items importer in the world until it stopped buying plastic waste from 2018. Due to its value, the 48 recycling businesses present in South Korea stopped collecting plastic waste, causing it to be piled up. In April 2018, the government took action to financially support these businesses. The Ministry of Environment decided to decrease plastic waste by 50% while increasing the rate of recycling from 34 to 70% before 2030. The Ministry of Environment would prohibit the production of colored plastic bottles in 2020, given their higher recycling cost. The government has also discussed the possibility of banning unnecessary packaging, as well as goods that contain materials such as polyvinyl chloride. In addition, plastic bag use would be discouraged, and plastic straws and disposable cups will be eliminated before 2027. The usage of plastic cups in cafes became illegal in August 2018 except for take-out orders. A penalty of 2,000,000 won applies. Businesses are not allowed to provide customers with plastic umbrella covers, instead of being encouraged to purchase water-absorbent carpets and/or umbrella dryers. Citizens are discouraged to use plastic bags by businesses offering paper bags instead, with non-compliant businesses charged 300,000 won (Indeed, plastic bags are not considered as a recycling material in South Korea).

Moreover, a regulation to collect colorless transparent PET bottles separately from other plastic recycling materials. This was implemented from December 25, 2020, and applied for nationwide households from December 25, 2021.

Since 2015, the local Seoul government introduced a new prohibition of paper and/or plastic in common garbage bags. This gave rise to some confusion, given items such as tissue paper and diapers were also categorised as paper. The government has since clarified that they were not going to be recycled.

== See also ==
- Environment of South Korea
- Pollution in Korea
- Recycling
