= Climate change in North Korea =

Emissions, impacts and responses of North Korea related to climate change

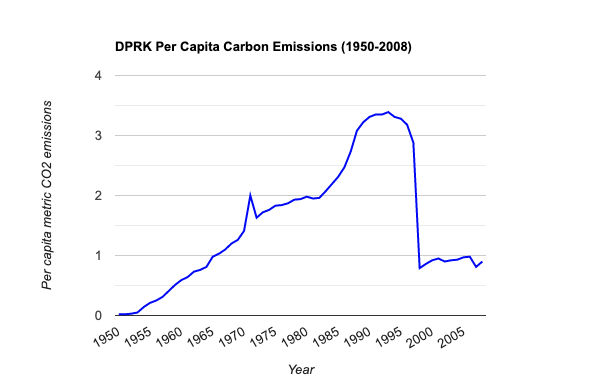
Per capita CO_{2} emissions of North Korea (1950-2008)

North Korea is highly vulnerable to the effects of climate change due to its weak food security, which in the past has led to widespread famine. The North Korean Ministry of Land and Environmental Protection estimates that North Korea's average temperature rose by 1.9 °C between 1918 and 2000. In the 2013 edition of Germanwatch's Climate Risk Index, North Korea was judged to be the seventh hardest hit by climate-related extreme weather events of 179 nations during the period 1992–2011.

North Korean carbon dioxide emissions are estimated to be roughly 56.38 million metric tons of CO_{2} in 2021. The vast majority of this is due to North Korea's reliance on coal for energy production. As a result of its mountainous geography as well as the onset of sea level rise and increasing frequency of extreme weather events, the biggest climate change-related concern for North Korea is food security. Low food production in 2017 and 2018 resulted in undernourishment in an estimated 10.3 million people. This has created a high dependency on foreign nations to fulfil food demands. This challenge - along with disruption to economic growth as a result of climate change - might undermine the totalitarian rule of the North Korean government and may be a cause for regime change in the future.

== Greenhouse gas emissions ==
Due to lack of consistent reporting, North Korean greenhouse gas (GHG) emissions are largely based on estimates, with most recent figures estimating that North Korean emitted roughly 56.38 million metric tons of CO_{2} in 2021. Despite the inconsistency between estimates, the general consensus is that North Korean GHG emissions peaked in the early 1990s; according to UN statistics, emissions have declined by roughly 70% since 1993. Additionally, due to low energy consumption, North Korean CO_{2} emissions account for only 0.15% of global emissions; this is down from its peak of 0.93% in 1989. This period of high emissions was largely due to the Chollima Movement, a government incentive that encouraged mass industrialisation and economic growth, while the subsequent drop in emissions is largely due to the famine of the 1990s and its associated energy and economic crisis.

=== Energy consumption ===
The majority of the DPRK's energy production is generated from coal combustion, and as a result roughly 85% of its 2019 emissions were from the burning of coal. North Korea's economic is highly dependent on coal exports, which generated $1.4 billion in revenue in 2013 (10% of the country's GDP), is of particular environmental concern to the international community, since the DPRK is using its coal and oil reserves to insulate it from international pressure over its nuclear weapons regime. Since higher-quality anthracite is reserved for export, the majority of domestic coal burned is of very low quality leading to high rates of air pollution. In addition to regional health and environmental effects - North Korea's pollution-related mortality rate is the highest in the world - this increased coal consumption is impacting regional pollution levels, with an estimated 20% of air pollution in South Korea having originated from North Korea.

== Impacts on the natural environment ==
=== Temperature and weather changes ===
Köppen climate classification map for North Korea for 1980–2016

2071–2100 map under the most intense climate change scenario. Mid-range scenarios are currently considered more likely

North Korea consists largely of mountains on the north and east coast. The largest range in the North is the Hamgyong Mountains; on the east coast, the Taebaek Mountains extend into South Korea and form the main ridge of the Korean Peninsula. These mountains form the country's largest watershed, where rivers such as the Yalu, Tumen and Taedong flow into the Korea Bay and the Sea of Japan. By contrast, North Korea's plains are relatively small, with the largest - the Pyongyang and Chaeryŏng plains - each covering roughly 500 km^{2}.

=== Sea level rise ===
In its Intended Nationally Determined Contributions under the UNFCCC, North Korea reports that sea levels are projected to rise by 0.67m to 0.89m by 2100, which it estimates will cause a coastline retreat of 67m to 89m on the East Coast and 670m to 890m on the West Coast. In its Special Report on the Ocean and Cryosphere in a Changing Climate, the United Nations' Intergovernmental Panel on Climate Change says that rising sea levels will have major impacts on flooding, coastal erosion and soil salinity, changes in which would further damage North Korea's farmlands.

== Impacts on people ==
=== Economic impacts ===
==== Agriculture ====
In its Environment and Climate Change Outlook Report, the North Korean government acknowledge that extreme weather events, such as droughts and flooding, pest outbreaks, forest and land mismanagement and industrial activities have degraded soil productivity on a large scale. Additionally, there was an increasingly significant variation in seasonal temperature between 1918 and 2000, with winter temperatures increasing by an average of 4.9 °C and spring temperatures by an average of 2.4 °C. In contrast to other scientific observations, the North Korean government views this as beneficial to agriculture, as the growing season is becoming more extended and agricultural growing conditions are improving.

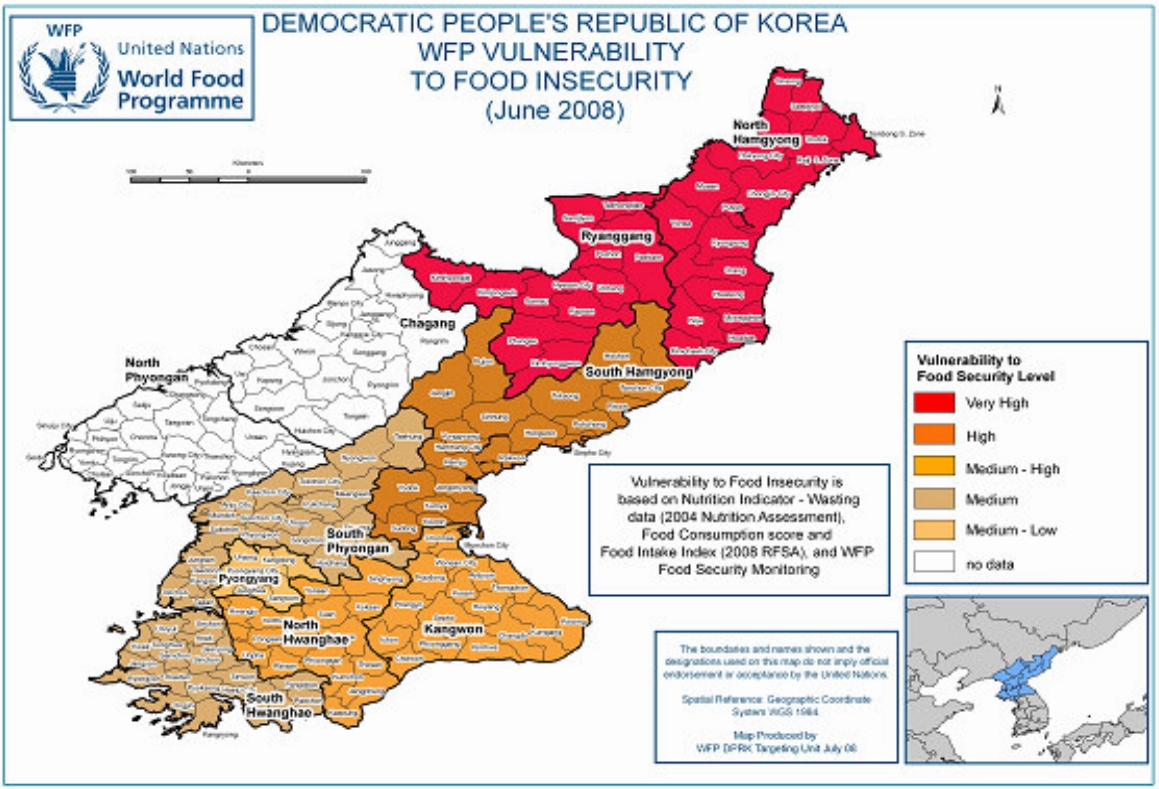
Map of DPR Korea Food Vulnerability and Insecurity 2008

Climate change in North Korea has had the greatest impact on agriculture and food production - according to Paul Chisholm of NPR:

The roots of what is known as "food insecurity" lie partly in the geography and climate of the country. Mountains cover most of the nation, leaving few places to farm. North Korea is also beset by widespread erosion and frequent drought. In addition, many of the country's farmers do not have access to modern agricultural machinery like tractors and combines. Add it all up, and you're left with a country that is reliant on neighbors for much of its food.

As a result of the impacts of climate change on North Korea's agricultural production, there has been a considerable reduction in food security for North Korean citizens. The famine that ran from 1994 to 1998 was largely caused and exacerbated by withdrawal of aid from allies, flooding and failed food distribution systems, and is estimated to have caused between 240,000 and 2 million deaths. Following an 18-month drought in 2014, the North Korean government declared national emergencies in 2017 and 2018 due to low food production in key provinces, resulting in major shortages across the country. As a result of these climate change-induced food shortages, the Red Cross estimates that 10.3 million North Koreans are undernourished and 20% of children under the age of 5 face stunted physical and cognitive growth as a result of malnourishment. According to a report by the UN's Food and Agriculture Organization, North Korea would require 641,000 tonnes in food aid in 2019, up by 40.57% from the previous year.

== Mitigation and adaption ==
=== Policies and legislation ===
North Korea's political ideology of Juche views the environment in the context of socio-political issues, which has resulted in the belief that a revolution from capitalism to communism is necessary to solve environmental issues. As such, the government of North Korea views pollution reduction, effective land management and environmental protection as integral to a socialist society. This led to the creation of the Environmental Protection Law of 1986, which discussed the importance of environmental protection in building communism and outlined the responsibilities of the government and the people in ensuring the preservation of the natural environment, especially in regards to pollution. Climate change has become a feature of anti-American propaganda, with the state media increasingly referencing American obstructionism within the United Nations Framework Convention on Climate Change (UNFCCC) as well as the USA's relatively large greenhouse gas emissions.

=== International cooperation ===
As a party to the UNFCCC, North Korea has ratified both the Kyoto Protocol and the Paris Agreement. Under the Paris Agreement, North Korea has pledged to an 8% reduction of its carbon dioxide emissions by 2030; however, it notes that with international financial support and investment, it could achieve a 40% reduction in the same time period. This compliance and international cooperation on climate change comes partially from a genuine concern for environmental protection, but is also a vehicle for receiving foreign assistance and aid. This international compliance is a result of the parallels between international climate politics and the survival imperatives of the DPRK's government.

North Korea has registered several Clean Development Mechanism projects to the UNFCCC in order to reduce its emissions - these include hydropower stations and methane reduction programs. These projects have been facilitated by $752,000 in UN funding which was approved in December 2019 and will allow the North Korean government to address the structural barriers to its engagement in climate mitigation.

In November 2021, North Korean Ambassador to the UK Choe Il attended COP26 in Glasgow, Scotland; though Ambassador Il did not comment on whether North Korea in climate talks with officials from South Korea or the USA, the North Korean delegation was present for a speech by South Korean president Moon Jae-in on reforestation on the Korean peninsula. The United Nations Climate Change conference is one of the few high-level international meetings that North Korean delegates regularly attend.

== Society and culture ==
=== Political stability ===
Despite concerns of unrest following the death of Supreme Leader Kim Jong-Il in 2011, Kim Jong-Un has been able to achieve domestic stability through an aggressive foreign policy and the establishment of advisory agencies and committees. However, climate change is posing a risk to this stability. North Korean totalitarianism, which is based on total control by the state, is largely unable to deal with major disruptions to economic growth, food production and energy generation resulting from climate change as totalitarian control requires more resources than more common decentralised governance - as such, climate change limits the ability of the regime to uphold its governance functions. In years to come, North Korea is expected to experience greater migration, government corruption and even the erosion of the Juche ideology itself as a result of climate change. In his 2021 report to the 8th Congress of the Workers' Party of Korea, President Kim noted progress in "establishing a national system for disaster prevention and crisis management", displaying a commitment to improving future resilience to climate change and environmental degradation.

While the effects of climate change on political stability are expected to be primarily domestic, there is also concern that regional stability will be impacted by climate change in North Korea. Food insecurity and extreme weather may result in mass migration to neighbouring states, primarily China - this may strain relations between North Korea and China which has the potential to marginalise North Korea, resulting in increased nuclear weapons buildup and threat perception by the Kim regime. Additionally, the increasing environmental impacts on coastal military facilities may result in climate mitigation efforts being misinterpreted by adversaries as a change in military strategy, thus potentially eroding diplomatic relations or increasing the potential for armed conflict.

== See also ==
- Climate of North Korea
- Climate change in South Korea
