= Environmental policy of South Korea =

The environment policy of South Korea is governmental actions regarding pollution or greenhouse gas issues, which South Korea has sought to reduce. The preservation of the environment is a constitutional right in South Korea. South Korea enacted their first environmental law in 1963, although there wasn't any funding allocated to it. The Ministry of Climate, Energy and Environment enforces South Korea's environmental policy. As of 2024, South Korea is the world's 13th largest emitter of greenhouse gases.

== History ==
The Pollution Prevention Law was enacted in 1963. The law was mostly symbolic because there wasn't any agency to enforce it, nor any budget allocated by it. Then President Park Chung Hee expressed concerns about pollution problems caused by industry at his New Year’s Press Conference in 1977. In response to the pollution problem, he spearheaded the Environmental Preservation Law, which replaced the Pollution Prevention Law. The law also created the Bureau of Environmental Management to administer it. Enforcement of environmental law was fragmented among many different ministries at the time, and the government's environmental budget was only 0.077% of its total budget.

The environmental law was amended in 1979 to give the Environment Administration authority to enforce environmental laws. Chun Doo-hwan declared the preservation of the environment a constitutional right in 1981. In the same year, the Emission Charge System was enacted. The system imposed a tax based on the volume of emissions. The Solid Waste Management Bureau was also established alongside several local environmental offices in Seoul, Busan, Daegu, Gwangju, Daejeon, and Wonju in 1986. During the 1980s, several businesses opposed pollution regulations. Business associations, which represented many of these businesses against pollution regulation, like the Federation of Korean Industries and Korean Federation of Small Business, were some of the louder critics.

Several environmental laws were passed by South Korea in the 1990s. South Korea's concerns about sustainable development first developed after the Earth Summit of 1992. The Ministry of Environment released its plan to preserve the environment, which was called “Green Vision 21” in 1996.

South Korea's Green Korea plan, which was launched in 2008, focuses on renewable energy development, energy conservation, and energy efficiency to reduce greenhouse gas emissions. The plan aims to decrease energy produced by fossil fuels to 61% and renewable energy being 11% of South Korea's energy.

The left-wing in South Korea is 8% more likely to believe climate change is a threat.

The National Assembly passed the Framework Act on Carbon Neutrality and Green Growth for Coping with Climate Change in 2021, which pledged large reductions in greenhouse gases by 2030 and full carbon neutrality by 2050. Enactment of the provisions within the law were slow. In the same year, South Korea pledged to cut its plastic use by 60% before 2030 and eliminate all plastic use by 2050.

In 2025, the South Korea's Constitutional Court ruled that the current law didn't protect citizen's rights. The court required that the National Assembly to amend the law to set carbon reduction targets for 2031 to 2049 by February 2026. The lawsuit was one of many over four years' time with 255 plaintiffs. The first lawsuit was filed by Youth 4 Climate Action, who filed in March 2020. In the same year, South Korea merged its Ministry of Environment into the Ministry of Climate, Energy and Environment.

== Issues ==
Köppen climate classification map for South Korea for 1980–2016

2071–2100 map under the most intense climate change scenario. Mid-range scenarios are currently considered more likely

In 2019, Korea emitted the 9th largest amount of greenhouse gases in the world, with 611 million metric tons of emissions. According to the Institute for Climate Change Action, even if South Korea meets its Nationally Determined Contribution goals, it will become the largest emitter of greenhouse gases among the 10 nations with the largest economies. As of 2024, South Korea is the 13th largest emitter in the world, emitting 654 million tons of greenhouse gases in 2022, which was 1.35% of global greenhouse gas emissions.

As of 2024, South Korea's steel industry is responsible for 16.7% of its emissions. South Korea's climate reduction goals do not meet what is needed to meet the Paris Climate agreement's goals, which would require a 59% reduction of emissions.

During the COVID-19 Pandemic, a suspension of restrictions against single-use plastics in restaurants to stop second-hand contamination led to a 18.9% increase in plastic waste between 2019-2020.

=== Extreme weather events ===
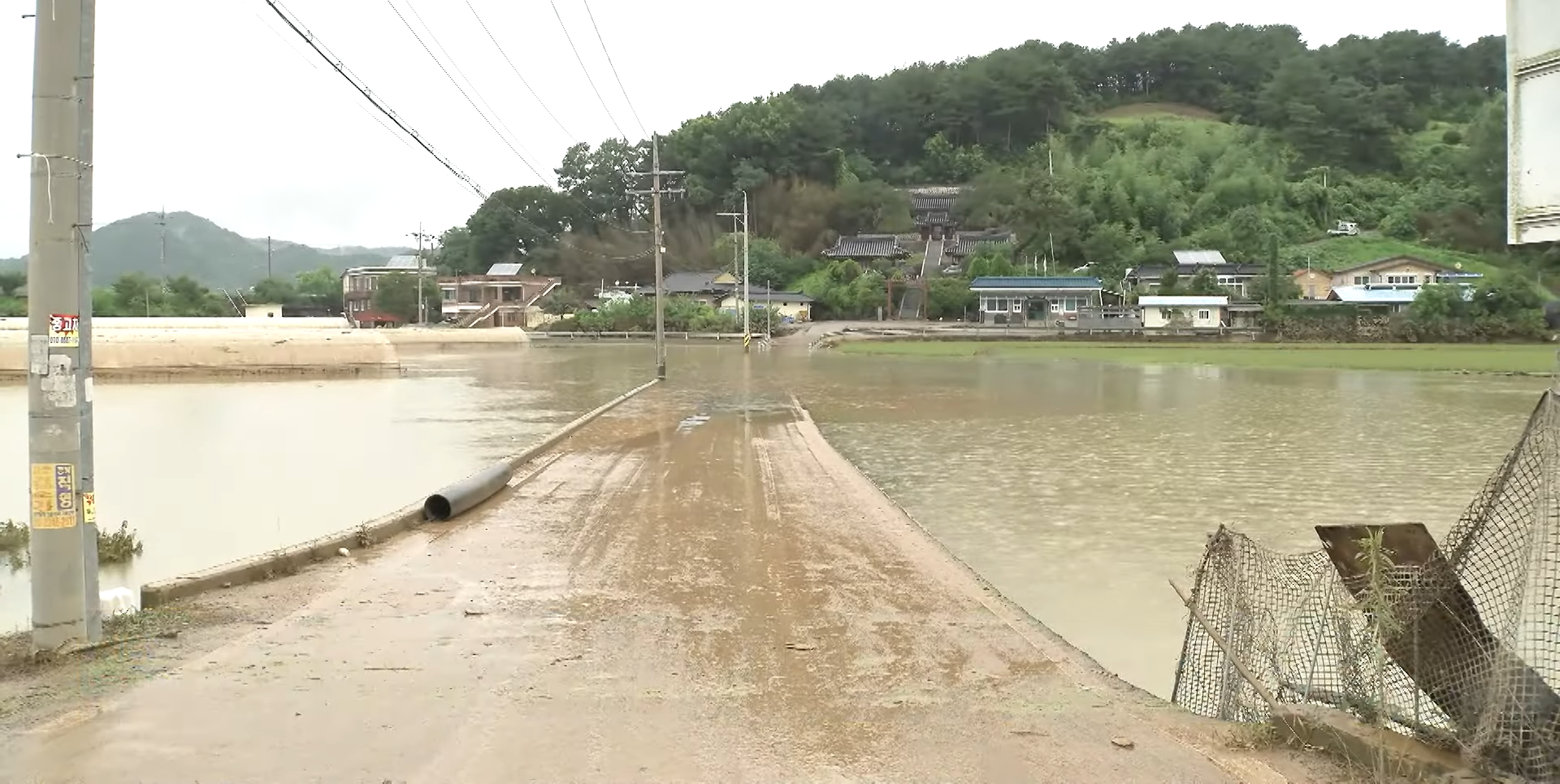
2023 South Korea floods

South Korea has been affected by climate change. Increase of flooding and typhoon, and damage from them is significant in recent few decades. The damage to property and loss of lives caused by natural disasters is a typical impact of climate change. Because of this point, decreasing the natural disaster is one of the goals for nations adapting to climate change. Increases in the frequency of flooding, typhoons, or hurricane intensity results in a steady increase of the number of large-scale natural disasters. South Korea is not an exception. Especially, damage from flooding and typhoon is significant. Despite the increasing threat, the vulnerability to natural disaster, especially typhoon, has been decreased possibly due to multiple factors, such as, improved disaster prevention, changed building codes, industrial structures, and land use.

==== Typhoons ====
There are about 25 typhoons every year in the northwest Pacific Ocean, and on average, three to four typhoons directly or indirectly affect the Korean Peninsula. When we divide the typhoons that affected the Korean Peninsula from 1977 to 2012 into two periods, we can see that the frequency and intensity of typhoons have recently increased, and the point of occurrence of typhoons has shifted westward and the turning position has shifted north. This is related to the weakening of vertical wind shear around the Korean Peninsula, the westward movement of high pressure in the Northwest Pacific Ocean, and the rising of sea temperature around the Korean Peninsula.

==== Heat waves ====
The Korea Meteorological Administration's heat wave standard is defined as a case where the daily maximum temperature of 33 °C or higher lasts for more than two days. The rise in global average temperatures, which has been accelerating since the 2010s, is increasing the frequency and intensity of heat waves throughout the world. In South Korea, too, heat waves have been frequent recently, including 2013, 2016, and 2018. In addition, the intensity of heat waves is increasing, breaking the highest record of daily high of 41 °C per day in Hongcheon and daily low of 30.3 °C per day in Seoul in 2018. Heat waves mainly occur inland in Gyeongsang-do and Jeolla-do. However, in August 2026, Yangsan recorded 42.5 °C, the highest temperature measured in South Korea since national weather observations began in 1904.

Among the weather variables, heat waves were more correlated with cloudiness than precipitation. There is a negative correlation between cloudiness and heat wave throughout the summer. Recently, local and global causes of heat waves have been actively studied. However, in order to effectively predict when, where, and how long and how strong a heat wave will last, we need to study the mechanisms for heat wave occurrence and maintenance in more detail.

==== Droughts ====
Drought is one of the weather disasters that causes enormous damage to areas that greatly affect the national economy and people's lives, such as agriculture, forests, and livestock. Since most of the annual precipitation in South Korea is concentrated in summer, drought occurs frequently in winter and spring when precipitation is relatively insufficient. From 1980 to 2015, the SPI-12 (drought index calculated from 12-month accumulated precipitation) was calculated from rainfall observation at 55 locations on the Korean Peninsula and the rate of change was calculated to confirm that the severity of drought increased statistically significantly in the northeastern coast of South Korea. And also it confirm that the frequency of drought increased in late winter, early spring, and that early fall, and the frequency of drought decreased in summer. Due to the recent rapid climate change, precipitation increases in summer, but there is no change or decrease in precipitation except for summer, while temperature increases not only in summer but also throughout the entire season. Thus, the risk of drought may increase in seasons other than summer due to a decrease in precipitation and an increase in air moisture requirement due to rising temperatures. In particular, in July–August 2018, when a high temperature phenomenon occurred nationwide, drought occurred due to an increase in evaporation on the ground due to a high temperature phenomenon.

==== Asian dust ====
Yellow dust is a phenomenon in which small sand, dust, or loess flies far away in the upper wind from deserts and loess areas in central Asia such as China and Mongolia. These airborne particulates are transported not only to Russia, Korea, and Japan, but also sometimes to the east of the United States, causing serious health problems. Yellow dust mainly affects Korea in spring. Recently, however, climate change has caused changes in the yellow dust phenomenon. As the temperature rose due to climate change, less snow piled up in the Gobi Desert and the Inner Mongolia Plateau, making it easier for yellow dust to occur when the wind blows, and sandstorms occur more frequently. Therefore, the timing and frequency of yellow dust increased, and the occurrence of yellow dust in autumn and winter increased.

==== Sea level rise ====
In the seas around the Korean Peninsula, sea levels have risen by about 10 cm over the past 40 years, and the rate of increase is 2.9 mm, which is somewhat higher than the global average every year. By region, the area near Jeju was the highest with an increase of 4.44 mm, with the east coast increasing by 3.70 mm, the south coast by 2.41 mm, and the west coast by 2.07 mm. According to the RCP 2.6/4.5/6.0/8.5 scenario, Korea's average sea level is expected to rise 37.8, 48.1, 47.7, and 65.0 cm at the end of the 21st century, respectively. In particular, in all scenarios, the southern coastal region is expected to have a higher degree of sea level rise than other regions, and the western coastal region is expected to have a lower degree of sea level rise than other regions.

The ecosystem affected by rising sea levels is the coastal ecosystem. The coast has a unique ecosystem as the boundary between land and the sea, and a wide variety of species inhabit and high productivity is maintained, performing a biologically important function. However, the coast is vulnerable to climate change because it is directly affected by rising sea levels, which is the most direct change in climate change, such as an increase in the risk of erosion and flooding. In particular, as Korea is surrounded by the sea on three sides, the damage to the coastal ecosystem will be great due to climate change and rising sea levels.
