= Environment of Korea =

The environment of Korea is the natural environment of the Korean Peninsula. Some environmental conditions are relatively uniform throughout Korea, while others differ by region, and particularly between the peninsula's two countries: North Korea and South Korea.

== Wildlife ==
The wildlife of Korea belongs to the Palearctic realm. Native or endemic species of the Korean Peninsula include Korean hare, Korean water deer, Korean field mouse, Korean brown frog, Korean pine and Korean spruce. The Korean Demilitarized Zone (DMZ) with its forest and natural wetlands is a unique biodiversity spot, which harbours eighty two endangered species such as the red-crowned crane and the Amur leopard. Overall, DMZ is home to about 70 mammalian species, more than 300 birds and about 3,000 plants.

At the same time the populations of bears, lynxes, tigers, panthers and leopards, which once inhabited the Korean Peninsula, are presently very rare. The local wildlife sustained some damage during the Japanese occupation in 1910–1945 and subsequent Korean War, particularly due to overhunting of tigers.

== Regional differences ==
=== North Korea ===
While North Korea was once flourishing with forests, the environment of the country took a serious hit first in the Korean War, when numerous forests were burnt down. It took another blow in the 1990s, when a few natural disasters swept the country. Wanting to rectify the problem, the North Korean government has since started planting trees on a regular basis.

=== South Korea ===
The national flower of South Korea is the Hibiscus syriacus, a species of hibiscus that blooms continually from July through October. In South Korea, it is known as mugunghwa (무궁화), meaning "eternal flower". The unofficial national animal is the tiger, for the peninsula seems like a tiger in a point of view. The unofficial national bird is the Korean magpie, which was chosen in 1964 through a poll organized by the Hankook Ilbo.

In 2011, the island of Jeju was voted as one of the New7Wonders of Nature.
