= Plug-in electric vehicles in South Korea =

As of June 2022, there were about 299,000 electric vehicles registered in South Korea. As of September 2022, 11.8% of new cars registered in South Korea were electric.

The South Korean government has provided strong support for electric vehicles including tax breaks, financial aid, and expenditures in research and development.

== Charging stations ==
As of November 2022, there were 170,000 public charging stations in South Korea.

== Manufacturing ==
As of 2021, South Korea was the world's fourth-largest exporter of electric vehicles. Kia, a South Korean auto manufacturer, has announced that it intends to expand EV production in South Korea to 1.51 million units by 2030.

== By province or city ==
=== Gyeonggi ===
As of December 2020, there were 548 public DC charging stations in Gyeonggi Province.

=== Seoul ===
As of September 2022, there were 35,216 public charging stations in Seoul.

=== Ulsan ===
As of August 2022, there were 4,184 electric vehicles registered in Ulsan.

As of August 2022, there were 1,992 public charging stations in Ulsan.
