= East Asia Climate Partnership =

Korean partnership for regional development

The East Asia Climate Partnership (EACP) is Korea's international initiative for global cooperative development. Led by the Korea International Cooperation Agency (KOICA), a Korean government agency responsible for providing overseas grant aid, the EACP helps tackle climate change in developing countries and promotes green growth in Asia.

== Overview ==
=== The impact of climate change and the vulnerability of developing countries ===
Climate changes have serious impacts on both the ecosystems and human well-being. Global warming caused by greenhouse gas emissions directly impacts temperature and precipitation. It also has indirect effects on water resources, agriculture, food security, human health, living conditions, eco-products and services.

Since significant portion of the population is concentrated in low-income class, the living environments of developing countries are more vulnerable to climate change. Especially, damages caused by climate change are the most critical among developing countries where people heavily depend on agriculture and lack sufficient infrastructure.

Impact of global warming
	Impact	Damages by sector
Global Warming	Temperature: Increasing temperature; Changes in seasonal patterns; Rising sea-surface temperature; Rising land-surface temperature and increasing dry land	Water resources: Severe water scarcity due to drought and flood; Low water quality and decrease in usable water due to drought and saltwater intrusion
Global Warming	Temperature: Increasing temperature; Changes in seasonal patterns; Rising sea-surface temperature; Rising land-surface temperature and increasing dry land	Agriculture and food security: Shrinking crop area due to land desolation; Decreasing key crop yields
Global Warming	Precipitation: Heavy rainfall; Glacier melting; Rising sea level	Human health and living conditions: Contagion of dengue fever, malaria, waterborne infection; Death and dislocations from community due to natural disasters
Global Warming	Climate anomalies: Heat wave, torrential rain, localized rainfall; Frequent tropical cyclone strikes; Tsunami; Severe drought	Eco-products and services: Loss of habitats and biodiversity; Loss of marine lives (coral reef bleaching, etc.); Tsunamis and coastal erosion
Global Warming	Climate anomalies: Heat wave, torrential rain, localized rainfall; Frequent tropical cyclone strikes; Tsunami; Severe drought	Economy: Economic damage from extreme weather conditions; Shrinking output in agriculture, forestry, and fishing

=== Official Development Assistance (ODA) to assist developing countries in Asia to counteract climate changes ===
Prior to entering the 21st century, the UN General Assembly announced eight international development goals, called the Millennium Development Goals (MDGs) in 2000, which include eradicating extreme poverty and developing a new framework for international cooperation. As many developed countries reached consensus that eradicating poverty and environment problems in developing countries are common challenges for the world and as a result, increased the UN target for official development assistance (ODA) to developing countries.

Global regulations to counteract climate change often impact economic growth for developing countries. In contrast, green growth paradigm reduces greenhouse gas emissions and environmental pollutions, and promotes sustainable development, which enables developing countries to tackle climate change in their pursuit of both economic development and poverty reduction.

=== Korea's efforts – East Asia Climate Partnership ===
Korea has become the first nation to turn into an aid-donor from an aid-recipient country by joining the Development Assistance Committee (DAC) of the OECD in November 2009. With growing interests in ODA, Korea's grant aid for developing countries increased by more than five times from 159 million USD in 1996 to 752 million USD in 2005.

In order to raise the amount of Korea's ODA up to the developed countries' level, the Korean government announced a national initiative to commit 0.25 percent of its gross national income into ODA by 2015.

Led by KOICA, a government agency dedicated to providing grant aid programs for developing countries, the East Asia Climate Partnership (EACP) was launched in 2008 to help developing countries in Asia to fight climate change and promote green growth. Proposed at the G8 Extended Summit in June 2008, Korea has committed to provide a total of 200 million USD for the time period of 2008 - 2012 through the EACP in the form of ODA. Through the EACP, Korea seeks to take the lead in promoting green growth in Asia and global cooperation in response to climate change, the most pressing problem for the international community. Currently, the KOICA is providing grant aid supports for 21 projects in 10 countries.

== Five Priority Areas ==
The East Asia Climate Partnership (EACP) designated five priority areas based on the regional characteristics, the needs of partner countries and the effectiveness in mitigating climate changes.

Priorities	Background	Major projects
Water resources management	Rapid increase in the number of natural disasters, such as flood, typhoon, and drought due to climate changes; Increased importance of stable water resources management by heavily depending on the primary industry, population explosion, and rising food demand	Water supply facilities (water intake sources, water supply pipelines, water purification systems); Sewerage facilities (sewage pipelines, enhanced sewage treatment facilities); Recycling of sewage for forestation (artificial streams, forestation)
Waste management	Serious waste problems due to rapid industrialization and urbanization; A growing need for more environment-friendly waste management	Landfills for household wastes; Solid waste treatment facilities; Biogas production from livestock manure
Low-carbon energy	The high dependence on fossil fuels resulting in rising greenhouse gas emissions and other serious environmental problems; Growing expectations for new and renewable energy sources such as wind power and solar power	Feasibility studies and pilot projects for solar power plants; Feasibility studies and pilot projects for wind power plants; Bio-ethanol and bio-diesel power plants; Enhancing the efficiency of electricity
Low-carbon cities	A growing need to reduce greenhouse gas emissions in partner countries amid rapid economic growth and industrialization; Green industry, a path to new growth engines and sustainable growth	Master plan for the development of low-carbon cities; Green buildings; Smart public transportation system
Forestation and biomass	Rainforest deforestation in many parts of Asia due to reckless development and rapid industrialization; Ongoing forestation projects in Asia and a growing demand for biomass energy	Forestation and forest management; Development of wood pellets; Prevention of forest destruction and depletion

== Key Projects under the East Asia Climate Partnership ==
The East Asia Climate Partnership (EACP) aims to develop and implement projects that serve the needs of partner countries and is currently working on the following key projects:

=== Water Management Landmark Project ===
To join the international efforts in addressing water shortages in poor countries, the EACP provides ODA worth 78 billion KRW to Mongolia, Azerbaijan, and the Philippines by 2015.

=== Projects customized to partner countries ===
At the end of 2009, the EACP implemented preparatory works for 15 projects designed to the needs of nine partner countries. It also works to develop three new projects for three partner countries in 2010.

=== Other partnership projects ===
The EACP is working closely with a wide range of international organizations, conducting research on ways to address climate change in East Asia, and supported establishing the Global Green Growth Institute (GGGI), which also hosted the East Asian Climate Forum. As part of the efforts to cooperate with international organizations, the EACP is currently supporting the research projects of the Asian Development Bank (ADB), the United Nations Environment Programme (UNEP), and the United Nations Economic and Social Commission for Asia and the Pacific (UNESCAP).
