= 2023 South Korea floods =

Natural disaster in South Korea

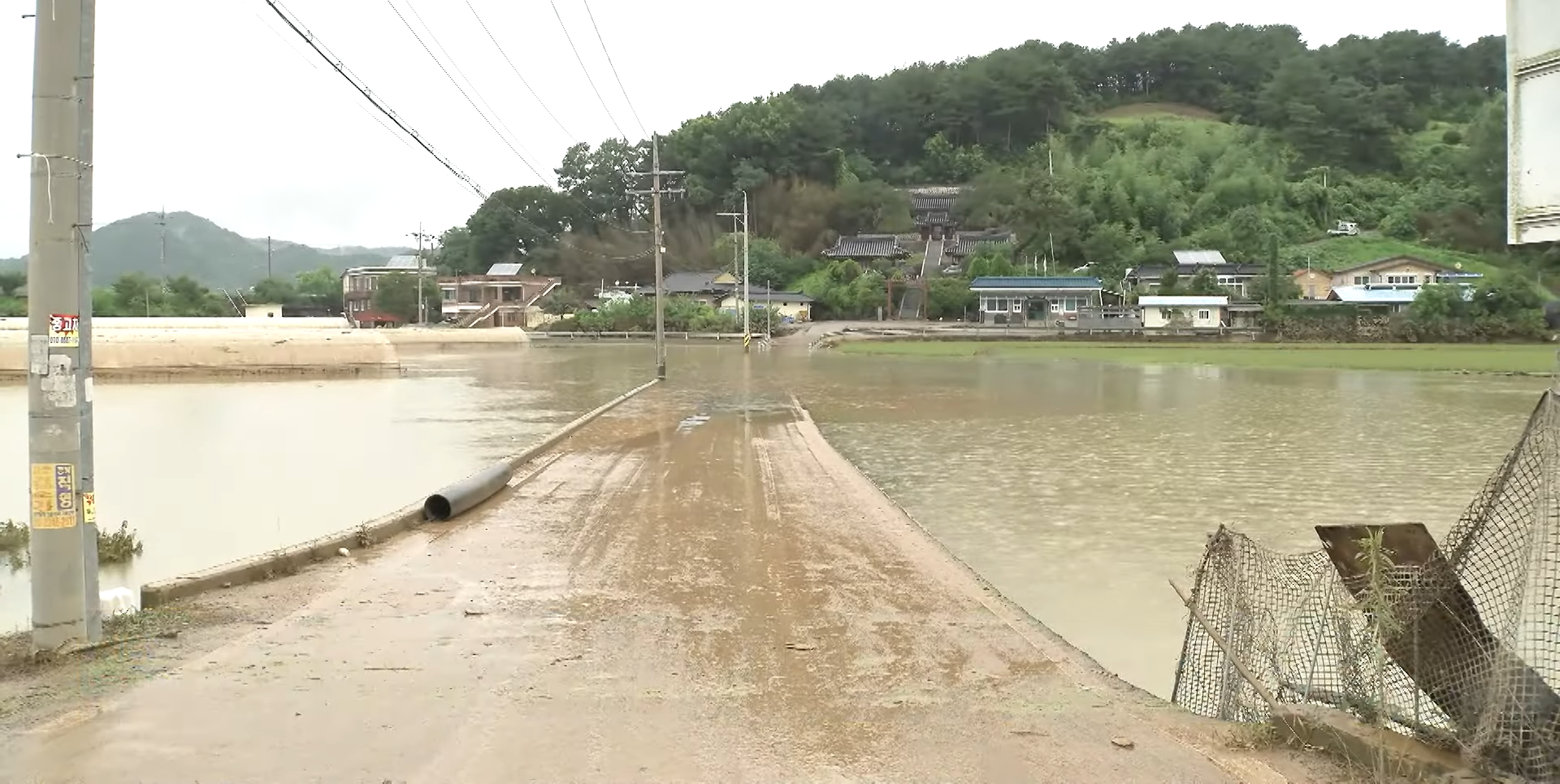
- A flooded road in South Korea
- Cause: Heavy rain

Meteorological history
- Duration: 25 June 2023 – 26 July 2023 (1 month and 2 days)

Flood
- Maximum rainfall: 372.8 mm in Gunsan on 14 July

Overall effects
- Fatalities: 47
- Missing: 3
- Damage: $590 million (2023 USD)
- Areas affected: North Chungcheong, North Gyeongsang, South Chungcheong

Heavy rainfall during the 2023 East Asian rainy season resulted in severe flooding and landslides across South Korea, primarily affecting residents in the provinces of North Chungcheong and North Gyeongsang. At least 47 people were killed and three are still missing as of 22 July 2023. The downpour is the heaviest in South Korea in 115 years and marked the third heaviest rainfall on record in South Korea.

== Background ==
The South Korean monsoon season usually begins in June and ends in the beginning of August. The country normally experiences heavy monsoon rains and its mountainous topography increases its vulnerability to landslides; however, the reported casualties this season are higher than usual. According to the Korea Meteorological Administration, the annual monsoon season began on 25 June 2023 and ended on 26 July 2023, with an average precipitation of 648.7 millimetres (25.54 in).

Flooding expert Cheong Tae Sung of South Korea's National Disaster Management Research Institute said that the fact that the rains occurred in the rural parts of the country, which are harder to monitor and reach, could be a reason for the higher death toll. He additionally stated that climate change was a possible cause, as rain in South Korea has been coming in more intense bursts rather than spread out over a longer period of time due to warming, making it harder to prepare for floods. Scientists have also mentioned that the climate warming situation has likely resulted in more floods across the world as extreme floods have also hit India, Japan and China.

== Impact ==
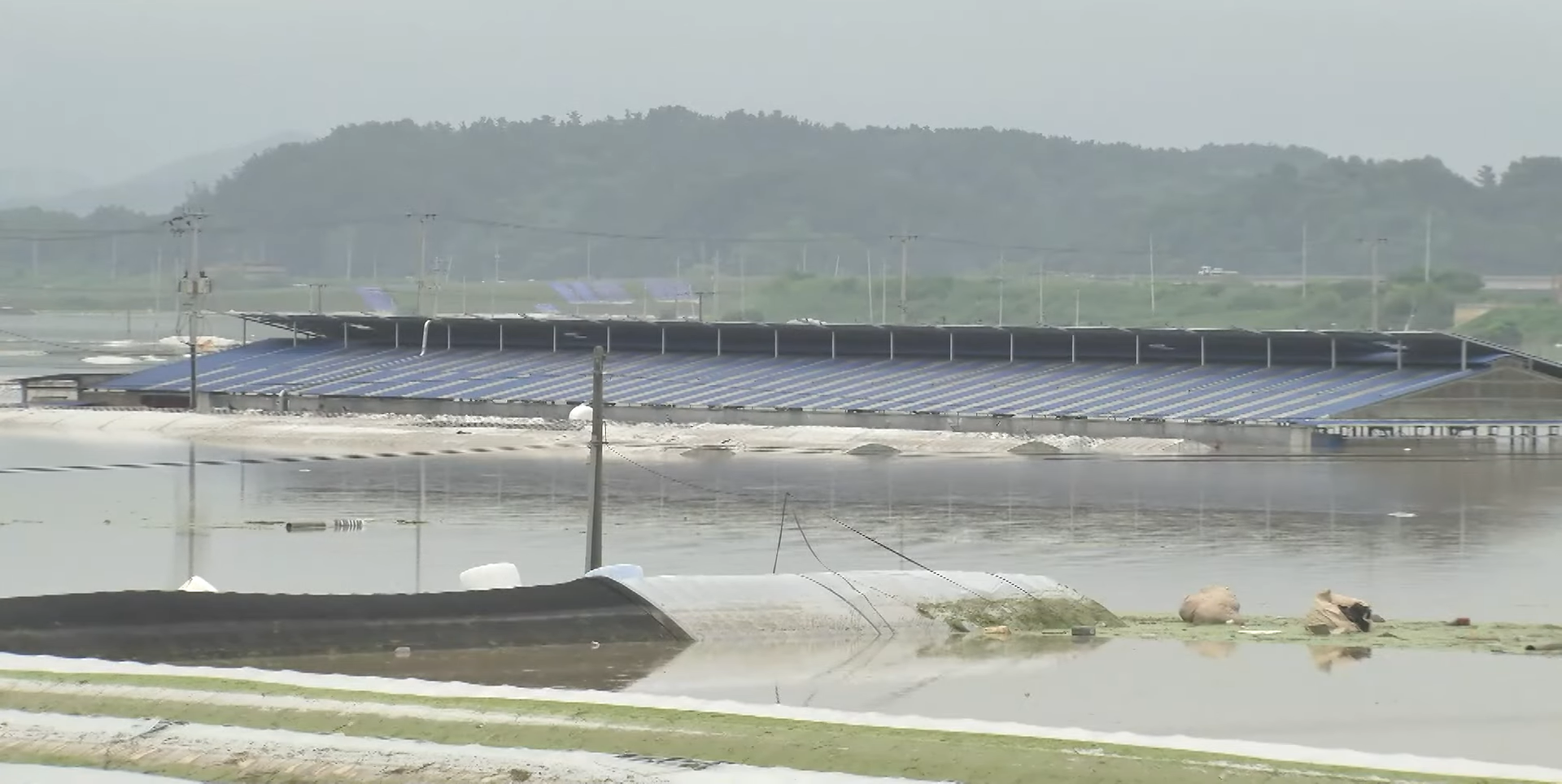
Flooded farmland

Many people were injured when torrential rains caused landslides and the overflow of a dam in North Chungcheong, and prompting the evacuation of over 9,200 homes and over 14,400 people nationwide. According to the Ministry of the Interior and Safety, over 34,000 hectares (84,000 acres) of farmland were damaged or flooded and 825,000 livestock were killed.

On 17 July, Yonhap News Agency reported that 628 public facilities and 317 private properties were damaged by the heavy rain. On 19 July, Yonhap reported that 1,101 public buildings and 1,047 private buildings were damaged by the floods, especially around South Chungcheong Province. On 22 July, the reported damage increased to 6,064 public facilities and 2,470 private properties, as reported by the Central Disaster and Safety Countermeasure Headquarters. Yonhap also reported that 471 homes were submerged and another 125 were damaged.

At least 22 people were killed in North Gyeongsang and four others were killed in South Chungcheong Province. On 15 July, a landslide occurred in the village of Baekseok-ri, Hyoja-myeon, Yecheon County, North Gyeongsang, which killed five seniors. One is currently considered missing. Damage of the flooding reached ₩751.3 billion (US$590 million).

=== Gungpyeong No. 2 Underpass incident ===
In Osong, a town near Cheongju, 14 people were killed when their vehicles became trapped in the Gungpyeong No. 2 Underpass after the banks of Miho River broke on 15 July. Fire officials estimated that the tunnel had filled with water in two to three minutes, trapping 15 vehicles in the underpass. Nine hundred rescuers, including divers, were involved in the tunnel search.

A flood warning had been issued four hours before the accident, leading some to criticize the local authorities and the provincial government for not closing the tunnel. On 28 July, 36 local government and fire officials were referred for investigation in connection with the incident.

=== Dam overflows ===
In Hwasun County, the Dongbok Dam, which provides water supply for nearby Gwangju city, had an overflow of some 800,000 tons per hour. The Hwasun County recommended evacuation to its 10 low-altitude villages. This incident is a repetition of a similar event from 2020, where another overflow caused 30 homes to be flooded. Because of the dam's limited flood control capability (it is primarily a water supply dam), residents have called for redesign of the dam.

=== Cultural heritage sites ===
Fifty Intangible Cultural Heritage sites were damaged by the torrential rain including Joseon-era hanok houses in North Gyeongsang Province, the Manhoe Historic House in Bonghwa County, which suffered damage as a result of a landslide, and the Choganjeong pavilion in Yecheon County. Other damaged sites included Gongsanseong Fortress and Mungyeong Saejae.

== Government response ==
Prime Minister Han Duck-soo called for the deployment of the Republic of Korea Armed Forces to conduct search and rescue operations due to the disruption of rail services in South Korea. President Yoon Suk Yeol pointed to climate change as a possible cause, stating that "this kind of extreme weather event will become commonplace ... we must accept climate change is happening, and deal with it." He added: "We can no longer call such abnormal weather abnormal." He also called for the need to upgrade systems to monitor water levels. Yoon designated thirteen areas "special disaster zones", which would make them eligible for financial support in relief efforts. At a press conference, the Ministry of Unification requested that the North Korean government notify the South Korean government of any plans to release water from the Hwanggang Dam.

Since 15 July, general trains and KTX service in affected areas has been suspended. Korail, the railroad operator, announced the affected trains will be resuming operation as soon as the checks for structural damage have been completed. On 17 July, President Yoon visited North Gyeongsang Province. On the same day, his government launched an audit looking into the handling of the flooding, particularly in the underpass incident. On 27 July, the National Assembly passed a bill for preventing flood damage, revising the River Act.

== Death of Chae Su-geun ==
On 19 July, Chae Su-geun, a South Korean marine, died during a search and rescue operation in Yecheon County. After being re-assigned from ground searches to an underwater search without proper safety equipment, notably missing a life jacket, he was swept away by the floods. The death and subsequent attempts at investigations provoked significant controversy in South Korea and damaged the public approval of the presidency of Yoon Suk Yeol.

The initial investigation by the Marine Corps accused eight people, including Chae's commander, of negligence and potential manslaughter. Despite initially approving the investigations findings, Minister of Defence Lee Jong-sup subsequently ordered that the handover to the police be halted, and then charged the head of the Marine Corps investigation with insurbodination. A revised version of the report approved by the Ministry of Defence reduced the number of accused to two.

In March 2024, Lee Jong-sup was appointed as ambassador to Australia. However, he resigned the position after less than a month due to the ongoing controversy over Chae's death. In September 2024, the Legislation and Judiciary Committee of the South Korean Parliament passed a bill calling for a special counsel probe into allegations of government interference into the investigations on Chae's death. President Yoon had previously vetoed similar bills.

== See also ==
- 2020 Korean floods
- 2022 South Korean floods
- 2024 Korea floods
- Climate change in South Korea
