= Pollution in Korea =

Overview of pollution in the Korean Peninsula

Pollution in Korea has become diversified and serious due to rapid industrialization and urbanization since the 1960s. The causes of environmental pollution, both in South and North Korea, can be found in population growth, urban concentration, and industrial structure, similar to the rest of the world.

== Pollution in South Korea ==
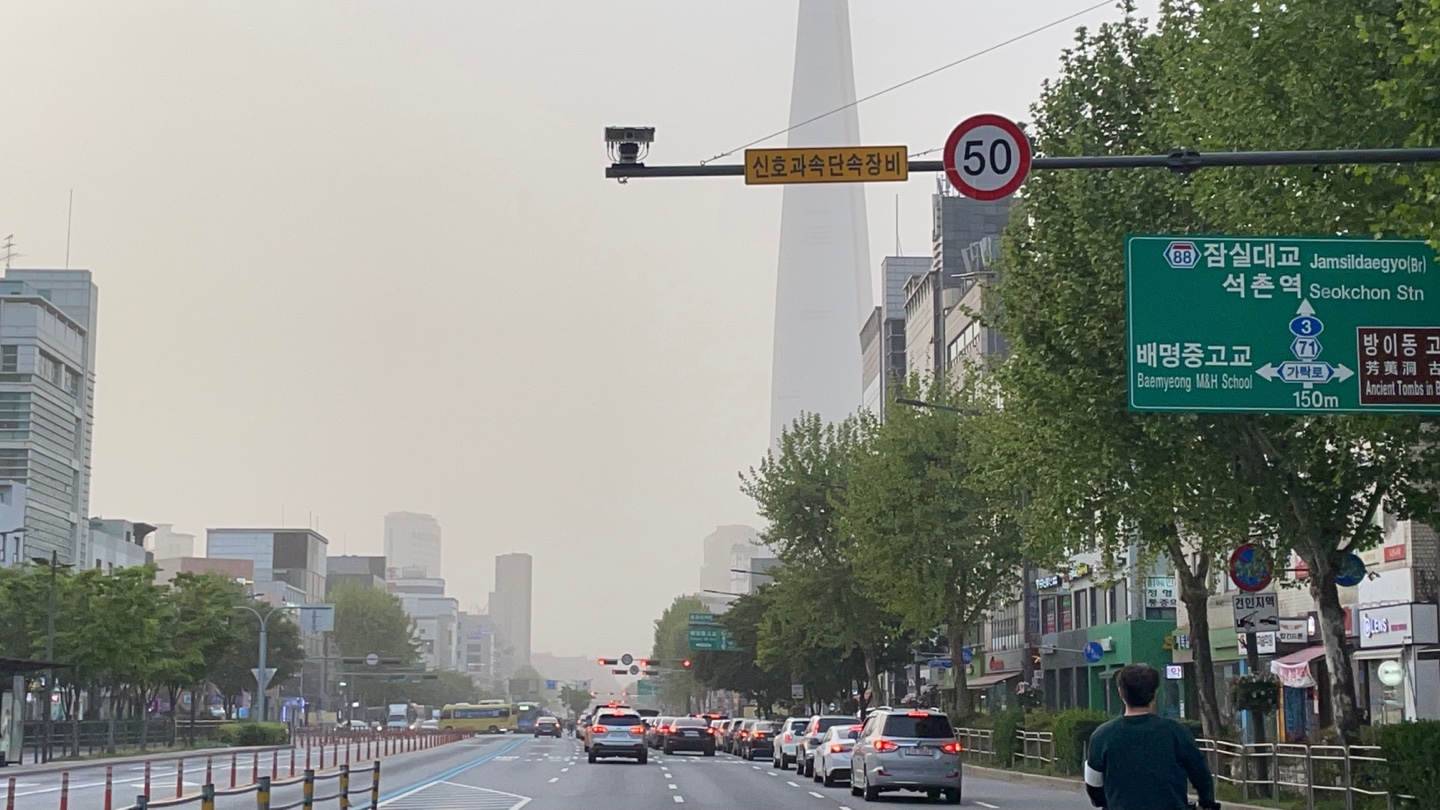
This is the appearance of downtown Seoul on May 7, 2021, when there was a lot of fine dust.

=== Air pollution ===
Air pollution refers to the fact that the constituents of the atmosphere change due to the excessive presence of pollutants emitted artificially and naturally, and their quality deteriorates, which adversely affects the life activities of humans and animals, and plants. Air pollutants can be broadly divided into gaseous substances and particulate matter. Gaseous substances are generated by the combustion, synthesis, and decomposition of substances. Particulate matter occurs when the material is crushed, sorted, transported, or otherwise mechanically treated or burned, synthesized, or decomposed. When air pollutants are classified according to the generation process, they can be divided into primary and secondary pollutants. Primary pollutants are emitted directly into the atmosphere from the chimneys of factories or automobiles, and secondary pollutants are generated by chemical reactions and photochemical reactions in the atmosphere of the discharged pollutants.

In the 1960s and 1970s, the use of fossil fuels and the reckless attraction of industries as a growth-oriented development logic caused air pollution in Korea. According to an analysis of the "2019 World Air Quality Report" published by AirVisual, a global air pollution investigator, Korea ranked first in ultrafine dust pollution concentration among OECD members, showing that it is the worst air pollution country. Air pollution in Korea is becoming more serious. The main cause of fine dust generation in Korea is a coal power generation and the use of fossil fuels (oil) in the transportation sectors. Thus, reductions in fossil fuels and greenhouse gases, and air pollutants should be continuously considered.

In addition, there is no border in the air. Air pollutants in Northeast Asia, such as China and Japan, are threatening the air environment in South Korea. According to the International Joint Study on Long-distance Air Pollutants (LPT) in Northeast Asia, China's air pollutants have an average effect of 32% on ultrafine dust in three Korean cities.

Fine dust (PM10) refers to dust with a particle size of 10μm or less and ultrafine dust (PM2.5) refers to dust with a particle size of 2.5μm or less. Common dust is large in particle size, so most of it is filtered out of the nasal hair or bronchial mucosa, which has a very small impact on the human body, but fine dust accumulates better in the body without filtering out the human nose hair, mouth, or bronchial tubes. The International Cancer Research Institute under the World Health Organization(WTO) has designated fine dust as a first-degree carcinogen.

Comparison of days by the concentration of ultrafine dust in Seoul in 2018 and 2019
	2018	2019
Very bad	4 days	9 days
Bad	57 days	53 days
Normal	174 days	192 days
Good	130 days	111 days

- Very bad (76μg/m^{3}): 9 days (+ 5 days)
- Bad (36-75μg/m^{3}): 53 days (−4 days)
- Normal (16-35μg/m^{3}): 192 days (+18 days)
- Good (0-15μg/m^{3}): 111 days (−19 days)

If you look at the annual trend of days with fine dust concentration above "bad," the number of days with "bad" is decreasing every year, while the number of days with "very bad" is increasing every year. The 'very bad' days of 2019 were concentrated on January (3rd) and March (6th). The reason for the increase in fine dust concentration more than "bad" than in the past is that the number of days when ultrafine dust generated abroad and in Korea has accumulated in the air due to air congestion has increased.

==== Government's response to the air pollution ====
From February 5, 2019, a special law on fine dust reduction and management was implemented. This refers to emergency measures to improve air quality in a short period when a high concentration of fine dust (PM2.5) lasts for a certain period. If emergency reduction measures are implemented, the public should actively participate in restricting the operation of vehicles, and businesses and construction sites should take measures to reduce fine dust, such as adjusting operating hours. In case of violation, a penalty will be imposed.

=== Water pollution ===
Water pollution sources are largely classified as domestic sewage, industrial sewage, and livestock wastewater. Among them, the proportion of domestic sewage is overwhelmingly high. The main causes of water pollution include domestic sewage, industrial wastewater, and agricultural and livestock wastewater, but among them, domestic sewage occupies the largest proportion as the main source of pollution. 60% of the total amount of wastewater generated is domestic sewage, followed by industrial wastewater, agricultural, and livestock wastewater. Domestic sewage contains food waste, synthetic detergent, and septic tank manure. These substances cause turbidity, eutrophication, and lack of dissolved oxygen, and if not purified, they contaminate lakes and rivers, destroying the water ecological environment.

==== Domestic sewage ====
Major pollutants that generate domestic sewage include households, lodging, food service, and public baths. The main contaminants are suspended solids and nutrient dyes.

==== Industrial sewage ====
Industrial wastewater is generated as a result of various industrial activities.

This is of high concentration and contains a lot of harmful substances such as heavy metals.

==== Livestock wastewater ====
Livestock wastewater is a liquid or solid pollutant discharged from livestock breeding.

Since it contains a lot of high-concentration organic substances, it increases water pollution if not properly managed and treated.

==== Cases of water pollution ====
===== March–April 1991 Phenol contamination =====
30tons of phenolic liquid leaked from Doosan Electronics in Gumi Industrial Complex into Nakdong River.

A pipe ruptured in a phenol stock storage tank at Doosan Electronics in Gupo-dong, Gumi-si, Gyeongsangbuk-do. 30 tons of phenol flowed into Okgyecheon, a tributary of the Nakdong River, and then went to the water intake plant of Daegu citizens. As a result, when Daegu citizens reported that tap water smelled, the water intake plant added a large amount of chlorine disinfectant without properly identifying the cause, making the situation worse. The water intake site responded with simple disinfection by adding a large amount of chlorine disinfectant. However, when phenol is combined with chlorine, it undergoes a chemical reaction and turns into chlorophenol. As a result, the tap water of Daegu Metropolitan City was quickly contaminated with phenol. In addition, phenol flowed along the Nakdong River and was detected in Haman and Miryang downstream, and eventually, phenol was also detected in the water supply source of Busan Metropolitan City, causing contamination of the Nakdong River basin with phenol.

Doosan officials apologized for the pollution and vowed to "restore tap water to normal." Government prosecutors condemned the company and other factories for water pollution and instituted an immediate 70-day crackdown; they also arrested six Doosan officials.

===== September 1991 Sulfuric acid pollution =====
A tanker truck carrying 20tons of sulfuric acid crashed in the upper stream of the Nakdong River, killing a group of fish.

===== January 1994 Nakdong River odors =====
Water pollution waves, starting with the smell of tap water in Dalseong, Daegu, benzene, and toluene were detected in the Nakdong River water system.

===== June 1994 Dichloromethane contamination =====
Dichloromethane, a Carcinogenic substance, was detected more than 5300 times the standard value, and water intake at 12 water purification plants in the Nakdong River was stopped.

===== June 1994 Waste oil pollution =====
The wastewater storage tank of the Seongseo Industrial Complex was deteriorated, causing corruption and urgent repair. It is the case of discharging 20 tons of waste oil that were being stored in the wastewater storage tank by using the rain gap during the rainy season.

=== Soil pollution ===
It refers to a phenomenon in which various harmful substances are injected into the soil according to industries and production activities, and various plants, especially agricultural products, absorb harmful substances, causing harm to humans or animals ingesting them, or impeding the physical and chemical properties of the soil. The size of the economy is growing year by year. Waste generation is increasing as consumption increases. If these are not handled properly, they can cause water pollution and soil pollution. South Korea defines 16 substances that cause soil pollution, including cadmium, copper, arsenic, mercury, oil, and organic solvents, as regulated soil pollutants. For each substance, a soil pollution concern standard is established, which are soil pollution levels that are feared to interfere with human health and property and the growth of animals and plants. Starting with the enactment of the Soil Environment Conservation Act in 1995, a full-fledged soil pollution investigation and purification project began.

==== Summary of soil pollution survey results for 2018 ====
As a result of a survey of 2,512 locations nationwide, 50 locations exceeded the level of concern for soil contamination, and the excess detection rate increased by about 0.2% compared to the previous year (1.8% in 2017, 2.0% in 2018). The detection rate of each city and province based on soil pollution concerns is high in the order of Gyeonggi, Seoul, and Busan. (Daegu, Daejeon, Ulsan, Sejong, Gyeongbuk, Gyeongnam, and Jeju have not found any points exceeding the standard.)

Status of soil pollution concerns exceeded by local governments in 2018
Sortation	Sum	Seoul	Busan	Daegu	Incheon	Gwangju	Daejeon	Ulsan	Sejong	Gyeonggi	Gangwon	Chungbuk	Chungnam	Jeonbuk	Jeonnam	Gyeongbuk	Gyeongnam	Jeju
Survey area score	2,512	317	104	116	89	95	85	65	15	293	222	134	199	155	158	250	165	50
Number of samples	3,417	347	165	116	89	95	125	83	15	920	232	134	199	155	218	272	198	108
Exceeded Region Score	50	10	9	—	2	3	—	—	—	17	3	1	2	1	2	—	—	—
Excess rate (%)	2.0	3.2	8.7	—	2.2	3.2	—	—	—	5.8	1.4	0.7	1.0	0.6	1.3	—	—	—

== Pollution in North Korea ==
In general, North Korea's environment is known to be less polluted than South Korea's, but North Korea is also in a serious state of environmental pollution due to its lack of awareness, investment, and technological conditions, and reckless development that destroys nature. So far, little has been known about North Korea's environmentalist policies, but the North Korean representative participated in Rio Summit and expressed his intention to respond to inter-Korean consultations on environmental issues. It became known to the world by acknowledging it. However, the environmental situation in North Korea is still not well known to the outside world, and related damage is only being reported intermittently.

=== Air pollution ===
North Korea mainly uses low-quality coal and wood as its main fuel and burns household waste to heat and cook, which is expected to expose it to considerable air pollution during the winter months. The World Health Organization (WHO) announced that the death rate from air pollution in North Korea is the highest in the world. The current status of air pollution in North Korea is estimated to vary greatly depending on air pollutants and regions. In the case of industrial districts, air pollution seems to be quite serious because air pollution regulations or pollution treatment devices are underdeveloped, or pollution treatment facilities are not operating properly due to a lack of electricity and parts. Also, air pollutants emitted a lot from coal combustion, which is the main energy source in North Korea, the concentration tends to be high mainly in densely populated metropolitan areas and industrial districts. The WHO reported that the death rate from home and background air pollution per 100,000 people in North Korea was 238.4, indicating that the use of air pollution multi-emissions fuel has a significant negative impact on the health of North Koreans.

=== Water pollution ===
The biggest source of water pollution in North Korea is industrial wastewater dumped from factories and mines. This pollutes not only rivers in the industrial complex but also coastal waters and groundwater. In areas where the population is dense, such as the Taedong River and the Tumen River, and industrial activities are high, water pollution in rivers is believed to be quite serious due to untreated sewage. The seasonal water quality of the Taedong River does not exceed environmental standards, but chlorine and Escherichia coli are significantly higher than environmental standards. In the case of the Taedong River, about half of the sewage and excrement flows into it without being purified, so that residents who drink the tap water are complaining of stomach pain. In the case of the Tumen River, coal mine wastewater, bleach, and domestic sewage flow from the Musan coal mine, Hoeryeong paper plant, and Gaesantun pulp plant in China, and it is in a serious state of water pollution. It is estimated that North Korea's major rivers passing through large cities and factories and mining areas are severely polluted. The reason for the water pollution problem in North Korea is, above all, that environmental basic facilities such as sewage treatment plants that can handle water pollutants are not properly established.

=== Waste ===
North Korea generates less waste from its living system due to a lack of supplies. Most of the solid waste generated in Pyongyang is coal ash, accounting for 64% of the total. In addition, fruits and grains consist of 10%, glass 2%, metal 5%, paper waste 5%, plastic 2%, cloth 2%, etc. Reusable materials are mainly paper, glass, iron, rubber, clothing, plastic, bottles, and Non-ferrous metals, whose reuse is limited by a lack of technology. This composition is quite different from that of a typical city in South Korea. According to North Korean defectors, most of the waste generated in life is reused as much as possible, and most of the final waste discharged is used as heating and cooking fuel due to a lack of fuel. North Korea's waste disposal method can be inferred from the amount of greenhouse gas emissions in the waste sector. It is assumed that most of the wastes in North Korea are incinerated or open-air incinerated, so it seems that the collection and treatment of wastes are not performed properly. When incinerated, waste is transferred to air pollution, whereas when disposed of on land, it can cause soil and groundwater pollution.

== See also ==
- Energy in North Korea
- Energy in South Korea
- Environment of North Korea
- Environment of South Korea
- Health in North Korea
- Health in South Korea
- Korea Federation for Environmental Movements
- Recycling in South Korea
