= Anmyeondo =

Island in Taean County, South Korea

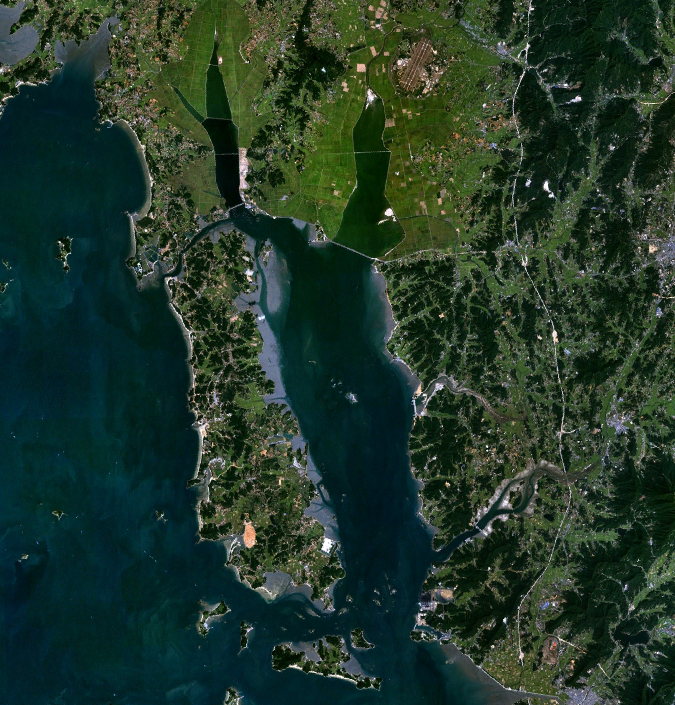
- Satellite view of the island
- Interactive map of Anmyeondo

Geography
- Coordinates: 36°30′N 126°22′E

Korean name
- Hangul: 안면도
- Hanja: 安眠島
- RR: Anmyeondo
- MR: Anmyŏndo

Anmyeondo (Korean: 안면도; Hanja: 安眠島; lit. rest peacefully island) is the sixth-largest island in Taean County, South Chungcheong Province, South Korea.

It is known for its nature, particularly that on its western coast, and its agriculture. Its local economy is predominantly based on agriculture; its fishing sector is relatively weaker.

It was originally a peninsula part of the mainland and it became an island after a canal was constructed to improve grain transportation. In 1638, Yeonguijeong Kim Yuk ordered the flooding of the area between Changgiri (Anmyeoneup) and Sinonri (Nammyeon) to protect tax sent to Hanyang (now Seoul) from plunder by Japanese pirates. In 1970, the Anmyeongyo bridge (length 208.5 metres) was constructed to connect the island to the mainland.

== Geography and natural features ==
The island hosts Korea's only maritime national park and is renowned for its fourteen beaches and the Anmyeondo Recreation Forest. Anmyeondo is also home to a "Population of Golden Rain Trees," designated as a Natural Monument.

== History ==
Anmyeondo features a 100-year-old pine forest, historically managed by the royal family during the Goryeo Dynasty. Since 1965, the forest has been under the management of Chungcheongnam-do Province.

== Recreation and facilities ==
The Forest Exhibition Hall in Anmyeondo Recreational Forest showcases the wood production process, uses of wood, and the value of forests in an accessible way. Additional facilities, including the Forest Cabin and Forest Recreation Center, offer cooking utensils, gas stoves, and shower facilities for visitors.
