= KDB Daruttaqwa =

Darussalam-class Offshore Patrol Vessels

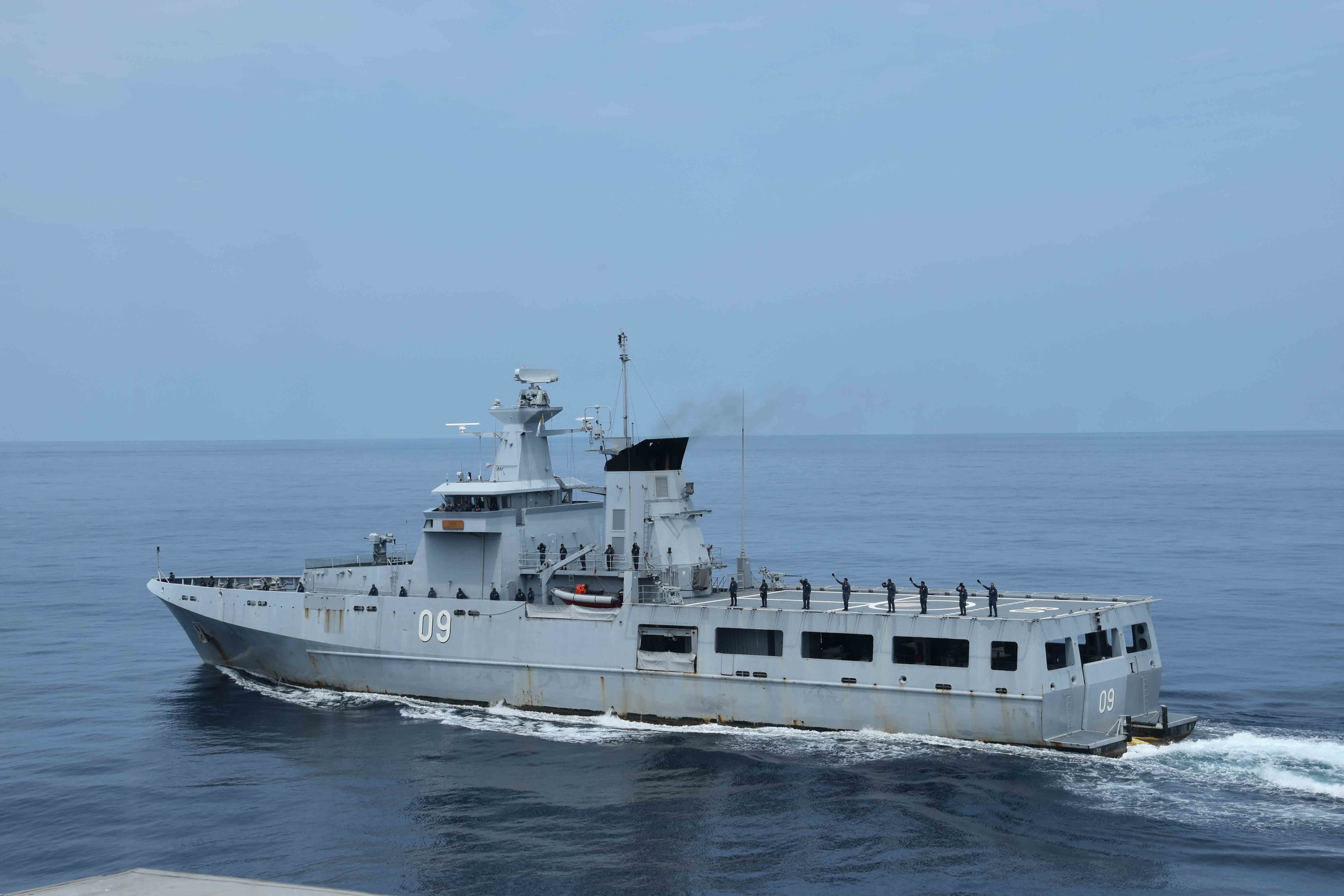
- KDB Daruttaqwa underway during CARAT 2020

History

Brunei Darussalam
- Name: Daruttaqwa; (Abode of Forbearance)
- Namesake: Daruttaqwa
- Operator: Royal Brunei Navy
- Ordered: 12 July 2012
- Builder: Lürssen Werft
- Commissioned: 8 September 2014; 12 years ago
- Home port: Muara Naval Base
- Identification: MMSI number: 915080003; call sign: V8DL; pennant number: 09
- Status: active

General characteristics
- Class & type: Darussalam-class offshore patrol vessel
- Displacement: 1,625 tonnes (1,599 long tons; 1,791 short tons)
- Length: 80 m (262 ft 6 in)
- Beam: 13 m (42 ft 8 in)
- Propulsion: 2 × MTU 12V diesel engines, 11,400 hp (8,500 kW)
- Speed: 22 knots (41 km/h; 25 mph) maximum
- Range: 7,500 nmi (13,900 km; 8,600 mi)
- Endurance: 21 days
- Boats & landing craft carried: 2 x Boomeranger boats 1x Boomeranger Patrol Craft (1 x 7.62mm gun)
- Complement: 55+
- Sensors & processing systems: Search radar: Terma Scanter 4100; Navigation radar: 2 × Furuno navigation radars; EOTS: (atop mast, front of search radar); Fire control radar: Thales Sting EO MK2 (only on her sisterships)
- Electronic warfare & decoys: ESM: EDO ITT 3601; Decoy: Terma DL-6T Decoy Launching system
- Armament: 1 × Mauser BK-27 RWS 27mm maingun; 2 × Oerlikon 20mm/85 KAA secondary guns; 4 × Exocet MM40 Block 3 (only on her sisterships)
- Aircraft carried: 1 × helicopter
- Aviation facilities: Helicopter landing platform

KDB Daruttaqwa (09) is the fourth and final ship of the Darussalam-class offshore patrol vessels in the Sultanate of Brunei Darussalam. The vessel is in active service in the Royal Brunei Navy (RBN).

== Offshore patrol vessel programme ==
Brunei Darussalam ordered the Darussalam-class offshore patrol vessels from Lürssen Werft, the same company that Brunei contracted to sell the contract-disputed Nakhoda Ragam-class corvettes. The first two vessels were delivered in January 2011. The final ship of the second batch of two ships were delivered by 2014.

== Construction and career ==
Daruttaqwa was built by Lürssen Werft company in Germany around the late 2000s. She is part of the second batch of two ships delivered from Germany to Brunei Darussalam. Daruttaqwa commissioned on 8 September 2014; 12 years ago, at Muara Naval Base. All four sister ships work in the offshore patrol vessel role.

=== MNEK 2016 ===
16 April 2016, Daruttaqwa was sent to Padang, Indonesia for Maritime Naval Exercise Komodo 2016, which is hosted by the Indonesian Navy from 12 to 16 April 2016.

=== LIMA’19 ===
Daruttaqwa was sent on a Maritime Exercise in Langkawi, Malaysia for "Langkawi International Maritime & Aerospace Exhibition 2019" (LIMA’19) which will last from 19–22 March 2019. She returned to Muara Naval Base on 5 April 2019.

=== PLAN 70th Anniversary ===
On April 12, 2019, KDB Daruttaqwa left Muara Port for Qingdao, China to celebrate the 70th Anniversary of People's Liberation Army Navy. Daruttaqwa later on joined "ADMM-Plus 2019".

=== ADMM-Plus 2019 ===
Daruttaqwa, HMAS Success, Xiangtan, INS Kolkata, INS Shakti, KRI Halasan, KRI Tombak, JS Murasame, JS Izumo, KD Lekiu, BRP Andrés Bonifacio, RSS Stalwart, MV Avatar, ROKS Cheonjabong, ROKS Jeonbuk, ROKS Wang Geon, HTMS Bhumibol Adulyadej, USS William P. Lawrence and VPNS Quang Trung conducted "ADMM-PLUS 2019" off Busan, South Korea. The ships have to conduct an exercise where they need to retake hostile vessels and rescue people overboard at sea.

All ships returned to Singapore to conduct check aboard cargo ships. Daruttaqwa returned to Muara Naval Base on 20 May 2019.

== Gallery ==
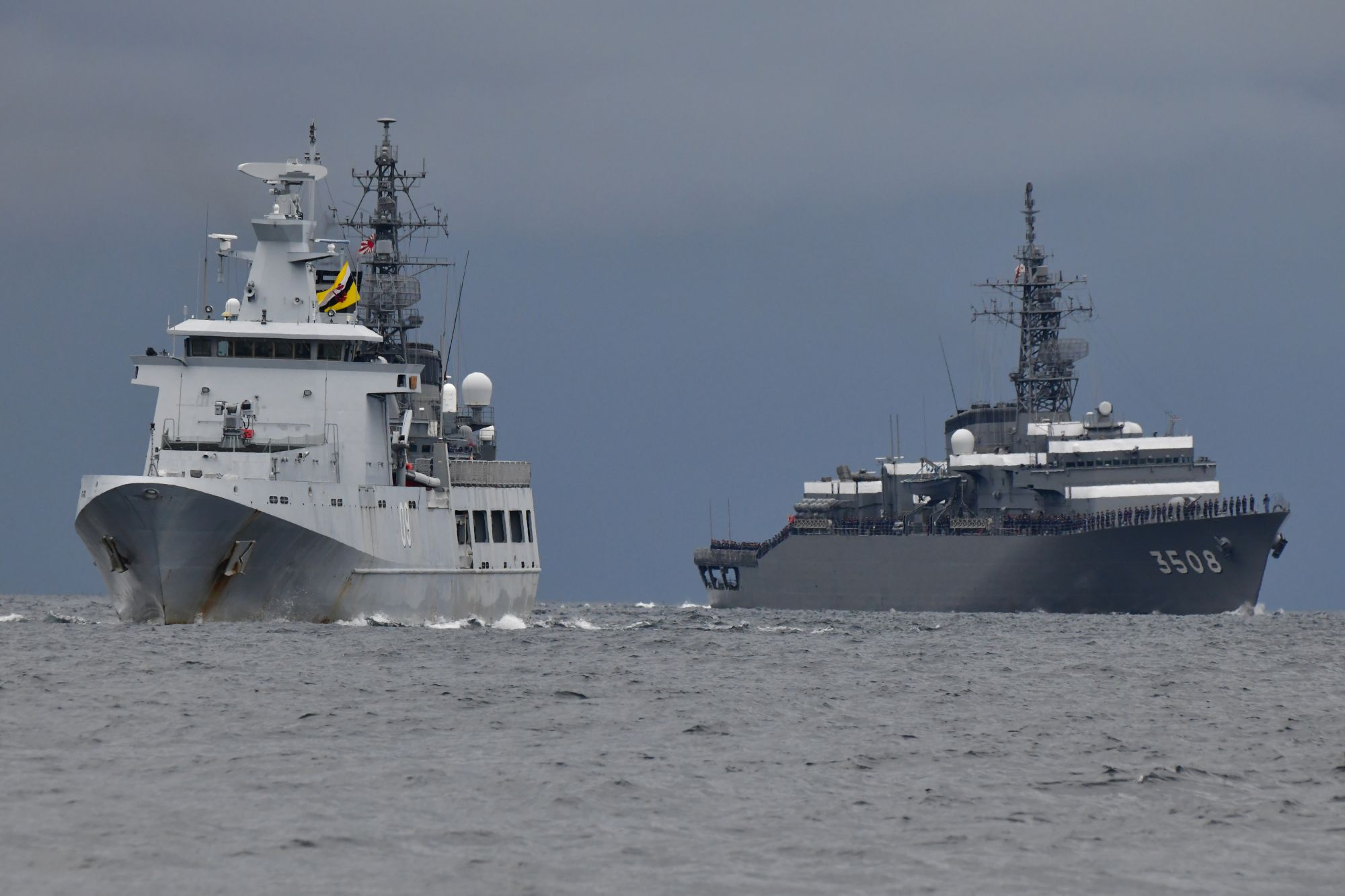
KDB Daruttaqwa and JS Kashima on 8 June 2021

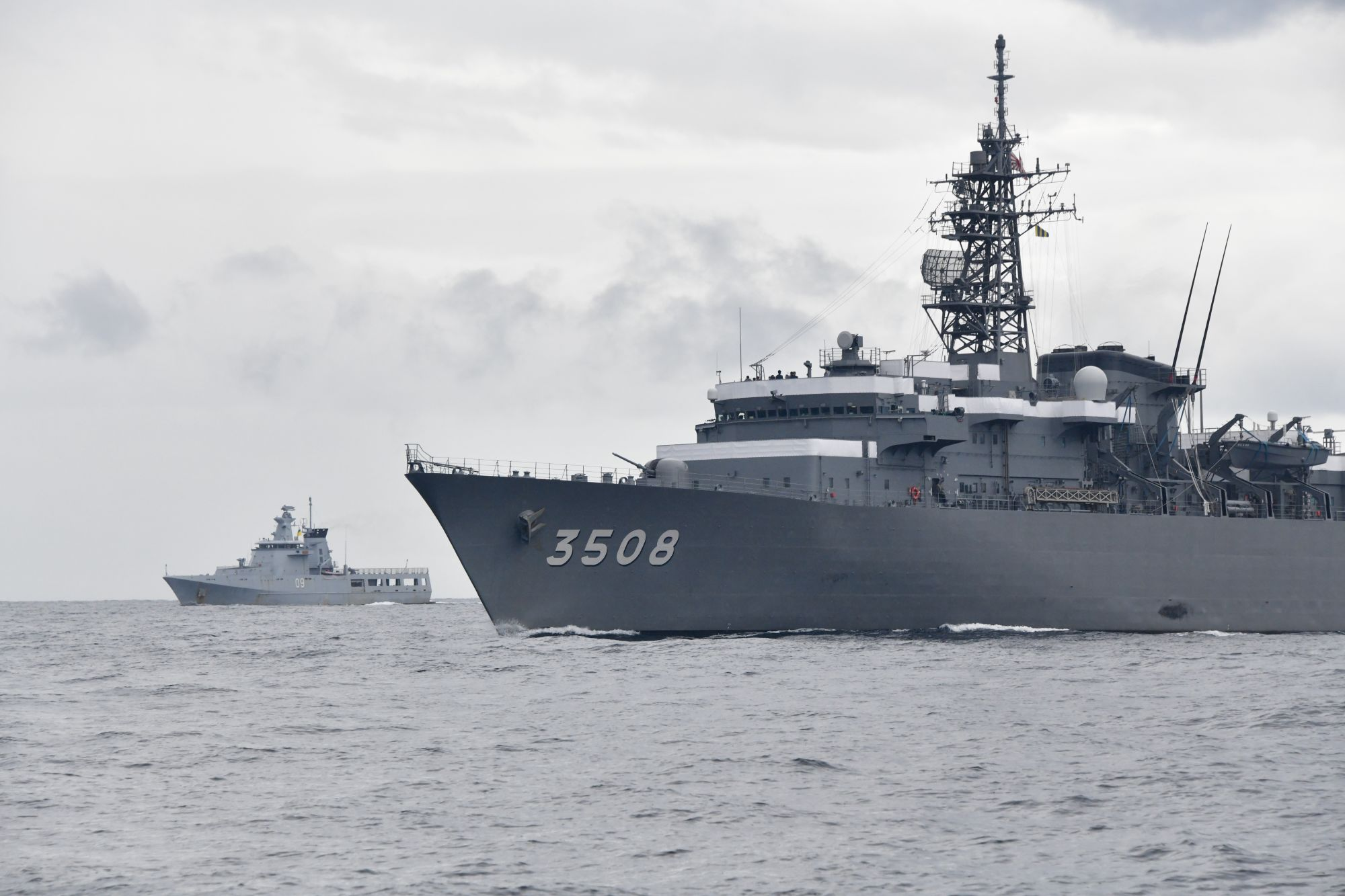

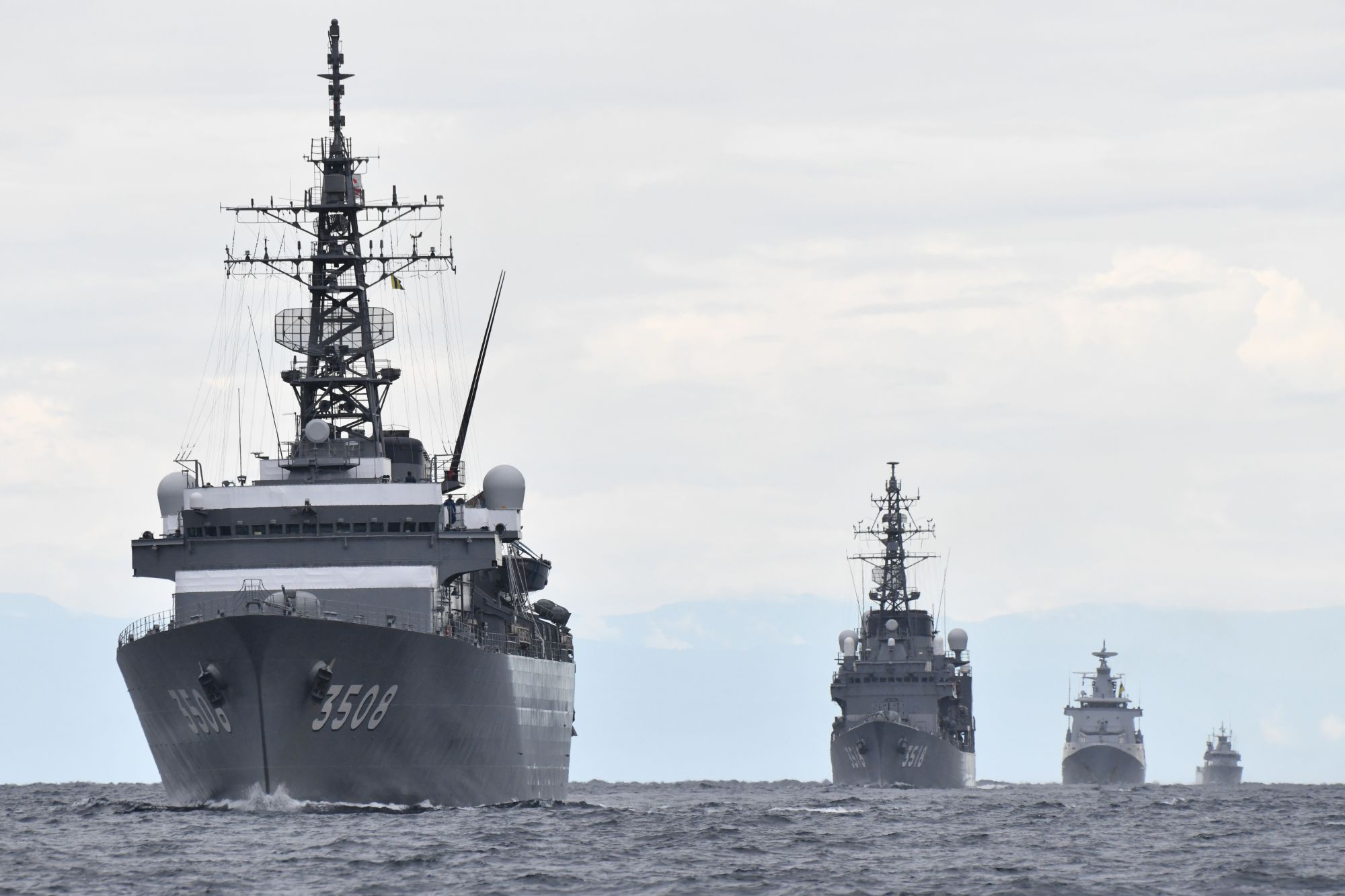

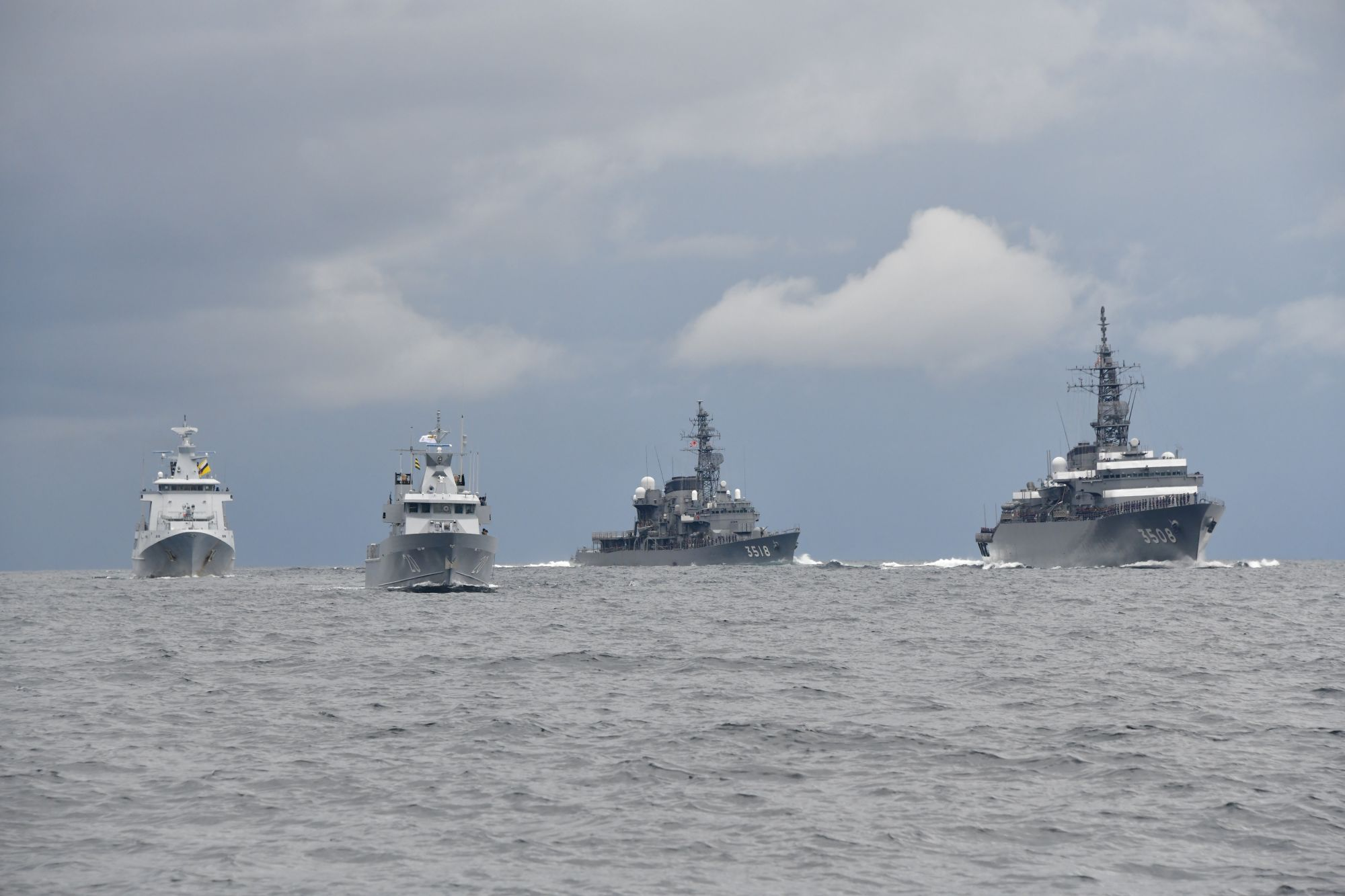
