= KRI Sampari =

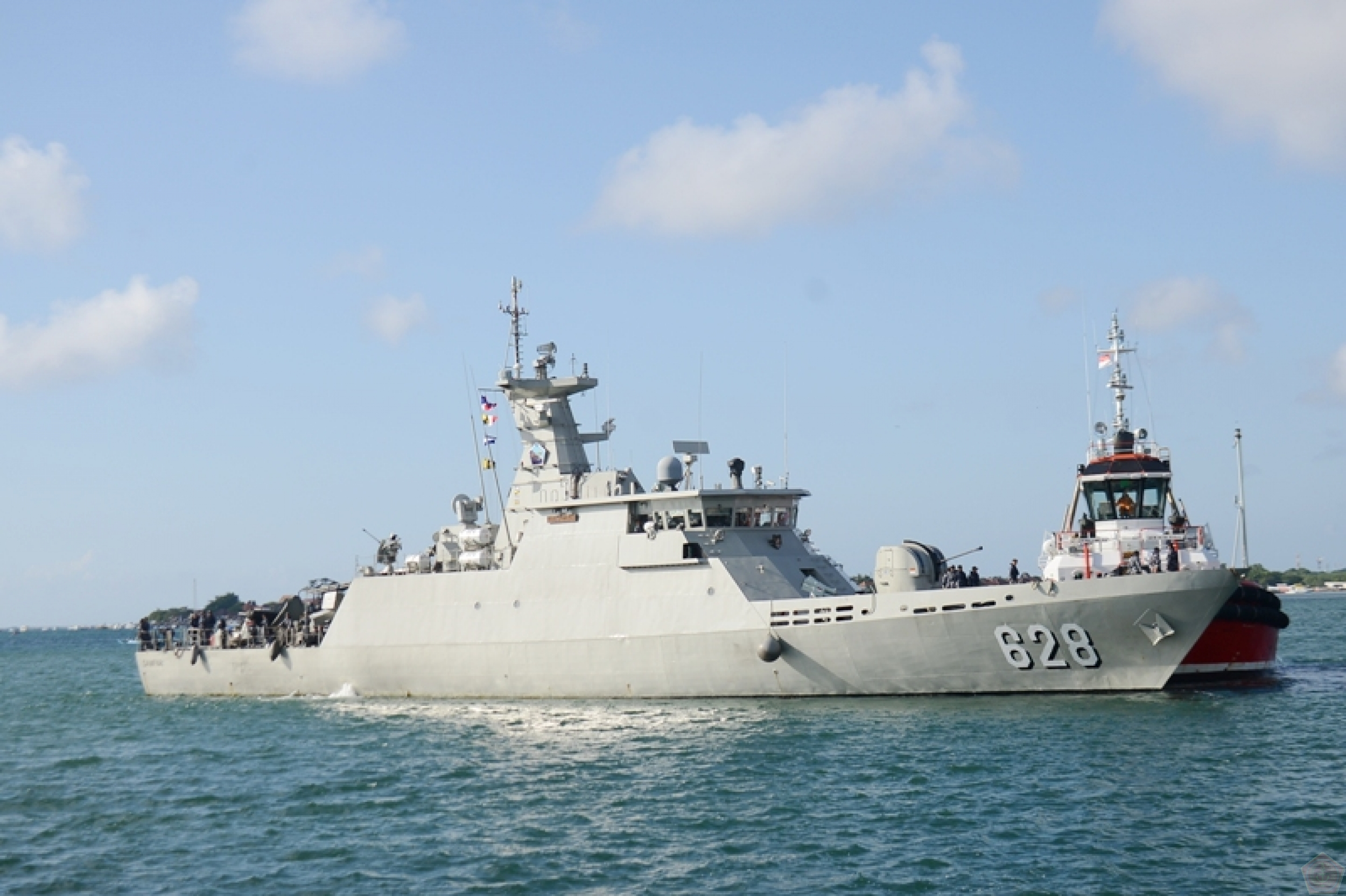

History

Indonesia
- Name: KRI Sampari
- Awarded: PT PAL
- Commissioned: 28 May 2014
- Identification: 628

General characteristics
- Class & type: Sampari-class fast attack craft
- Displacement: 460 tonnes
- Length: 59.8 m
- Beam: 8.1 m
- Draft: 2.6 m
- Speed: 28 knots (52 km/h) (max)
- Range: 2,400 nautical miles (4,400 km)
- Endurance: 9 days

KRI Sampari (628) is a Sampari-class fast attack craft of the Indonesian Navy. Built by PT PAL, she is the lead ship in her class.

== Characteristics ==
The vessel, part of the KCR-60m family of fast attack missile craft, has a length of 59.8 metres (196 ft) and a beam of 8.1 m. At full charge, it has a draft of 2.6 m, and the ship's displacement is 460 tonnes. It has a maximum speed of 28 knots (52 km/h), with a cruising speed of 20 knots (37 km/h). She can stay at sea for 9 days, with a range of 2,400 nautical miles (4,400 km) and a crew capacity of 43.

She is armed with the Chinese-manufactured version of the AK-630 (NG-18) CIWS, the Bofors 40mm as main gun, and Yugoimport-SDPR M71/08 20mm cannon as secondary gun.

== Service history ==
Sampari was commissioned on 28 May 2014, as the first ship of her class. In late 2017, Sampari's missile-launching capabilities was removed, but the decision was reversed and the missiles were reinstalled.

In August 2019, Sampari participated in the Cooperation Afloat Readiness and Training exercise with KRI Sultan Iskandar Muda and KRI Nala, alongside U.S. Navy vessels USS Montgomery, USS Fall River, and USCGC Stratton.
