= KRI Tombak =

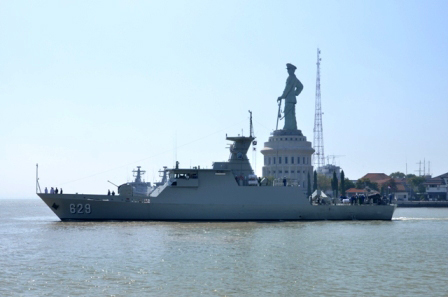

History

Indonesia
- Name: KRI Tombak
- Awarded: PT PAL
- Commissioned: 27 August 2014
- Identification: 629

General characteristics
- Class & type: Sampari-class fast attack craft
- Displacement: 460 tonnes
- Length: 59.8 m
- Beam: 8.1 m
- Draft: 2.6 m
- Speed: 28 knots (52 km/h) (max)
- Range: 2,400 nautical miles (4,400 km)
- Endurance: 9 days

KRI Tombak (629) is a Sampari-class fast attack craft of the Indonesian Navy. Built by PT PAL, she is the second ship in her class.

== Characteristics ==
The vessel, part of the KCR-60m family of fast attack missile craft, has a length of 59.8 metres (196 ft) and a beam of 8.1 m. At full charge, it has a draft of 2.6 m, and the ship's displacement is 460 tonnes. It has a maximum speed of 28 knots (52 km/h), with a cruising speed of 20 knots (37 km/h). She can stay at sea for 9 days, with a range of 2,400 nautical miles (4,400 km) and a crew capacity of 43.

== Service history ==
Tombak was built by PT PAL and was commissioned into the Indonesian Navy on 27 August 2014. She was initially assigned to the Eastern Fleet Command (Koarmatim). In June 2015, Tombak alongside the KRI Hiu (634) conducted joint exercises with the Royal Australian Navy vessels Glenelg and Wollongong in Kupang. Her missile launchers were removed in late 2017 and a Type 630 CIWS was installed, but by May 2019 there were plans to reattach the launchers in a different position.

In August 2019, she participated in the rescue of passengers of the MV Santika Nusantara, a RORO passenger ship which caught fire in the Java Sea. Alongside the Halasan, Tombak took part in the 2019 International Maritime Defense Exhibition & Conference (IMDEX) Asia as one of the two Indonesian Navy vessels on display.
