= KRI Halasan =

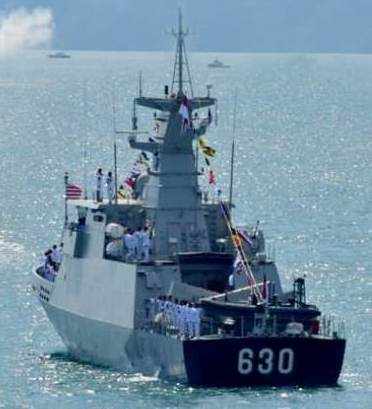

History

Indonesia
- Name: KRI Halasan
- Awarded: PT PAL
- Launched: 9 July 2014
- Commissioned: 17 September 2014
- Identification: 630

General characteristics
- Class & type: Sampari-class fast attack craft
- Displacement: 460 tonnes
- Length: 59.8 m
- Beam: 8.1 m
- Draft: 2.6 m
- Speed: 28 knots (52 km/h) (max)
- Range: 2,400 nautical miles (4,400 km)
- Endurance: 9 days

KRI Halasan (630) is a Sampari-class fast attack craft of the Indonesian Navy. Built by PT PAL, she was the third ship in her class and is assigned to patrolling the waters around the Natuna Islands and the Straits of Malacca.

== Characteristics ==
The vessel, part of the KCR-60m family of fast attack missile craft, has a length of 59.8 metres (196 ft) and a beam of 8.1 m. At full charge, it has a draft of 2.6 m, and the ship's displacement is 460 tonnes. It has a maximum speed of 28 knots (52 km/h), with a cruising speed of 20 knots (37 km/h). She can stay at sea for 9 days, with a range of 2,400 nautical miles (4,400 km) and a crew capacity of 43.

She is armed with the Bofors 57 mm L/70 naval artillery gun, which replaced the previous 40 mm version. Additionally, she is also equipped with two 20 mm guns and two anti-ship missile launchers.

== Service history ==
Halasan was built by PT PAL and was launched in Surabaya around July 2014 as the third ship in her class, and was commissioned by the Indonesian Navy on 17 September 2014, being assigned to the Western Fleet Command (Koarmabar).

She is based in Tanjung Uban, Riau Islands, and patrolled the Straits of Malacca. Halasan seized two Vietnamese fishing vessels allegedly intruding in Indonesian waters around the Natuna Islands in April 2017, another Vietnamese vessel in May 2018, and a Malaysian fishing vessel in the Malacca Strait on 8 October 2018. She took part in the 2019 International Maritime Defense Exhibition & Conference (IMDEX) Asia as one of the two Indonesian Navy vessels on display, alongside Tombak.
