= Sampari-class fast attack craft =

Class of ship in the Indonesian Navy

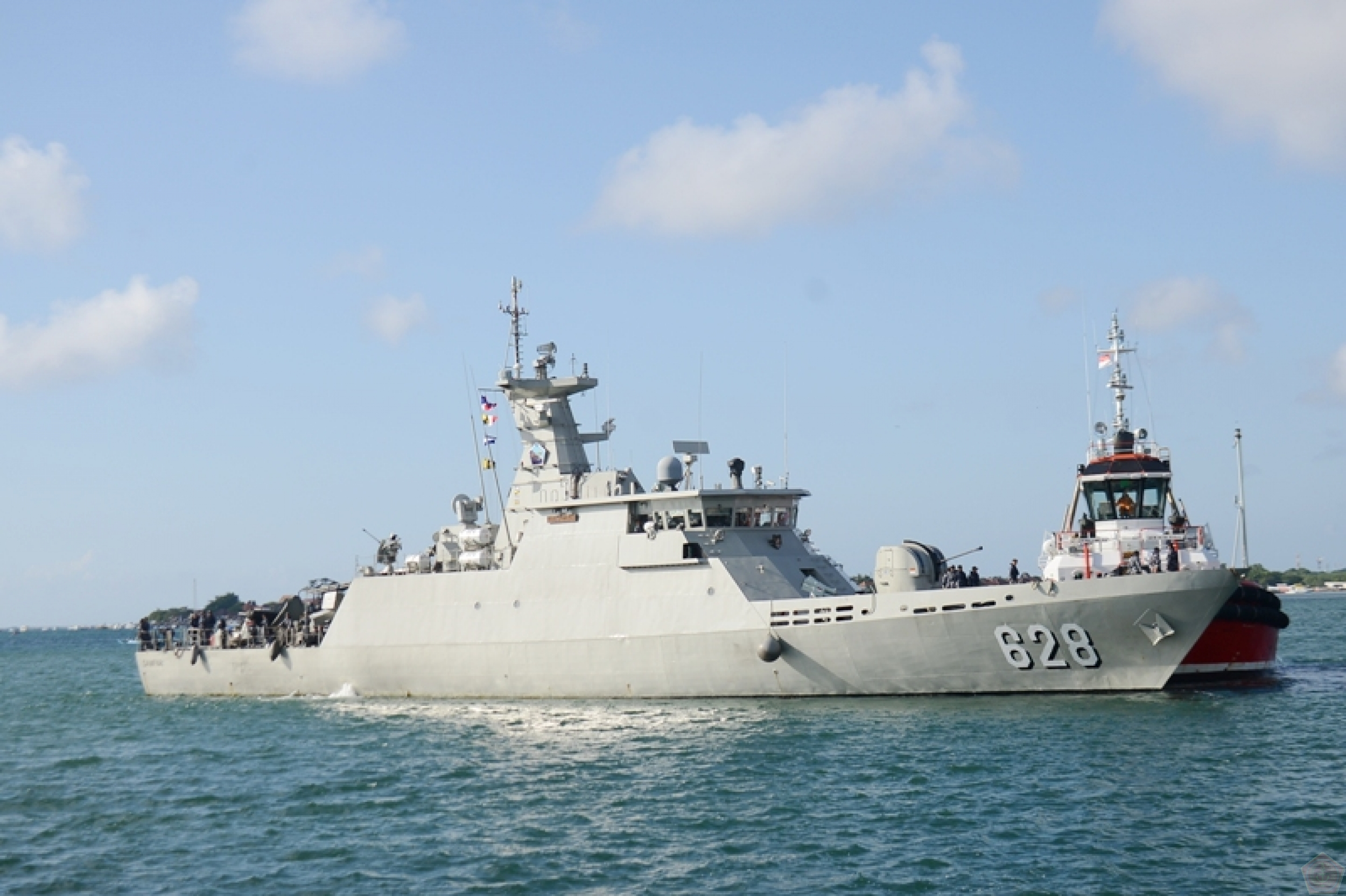
- KRI Sampari

Class overview
- Name: Sampari class
- Builders: PAL Indonesia
- Operators: Indonesian Navy
- Preceded by: Clurit class
- Planned: 18
- Completed: 6
- Active: 6

General characteristics
- Class & type: Missile boat
- Displacement: 460 tons - 500 tons
- Length: 60.3 m (197 ft 10 in)
- Beam: 8.1 m (26 ft 7 in)
- Height: 4.85 m (15 ft 11 in)
- Propulsion: 2 × 3600KW MTU 20V 4000M73L
- Speed: 30 knots (56 km/h; 35 mph)
- Range: 2,400 nmi (4,445 km; 2,762 mi)
- Endurance: 8 days
- Complement: 55
- Sensors & processing systems: Combat System: Hull 628 & 629 only: H/ZKT-series Combat Management System; The rest of the class: Terma C-Flex Combat Management System; Search Radar: Hull 628 & 629 only: 1 × SR-47AG Search Radar; The rest of the class: 1 × Terma SCANTER 4603 X-Band Radar; Fire Control Radar: Hull 628 & 629 only: 1 × TR-47C Fire control Radar; The rest of the class: 1 × Terma C-Fire EO Fire Control Optic
- Electronic warfare & decoys: Decoy: Hull 628 & 629 only: 2 × 6-tube 122mm decoy launcher; The rest of the class: 2 × 6-tube 130mm Terma C-Guard DL-6T Naval Decoy Launching System; ESM: Hull 628 & 629 only: Type 826 ESM; The rest of the class: Teledyne PHOBOS RESM
- Armament: - Hull 628 & 629 only: 1 × 57mm AU-220M Naval Mount; 2 × Yugoimport-SDPR M71/08 20mm autocannon; 1 × NG-18 CIWS; 4 × C-705 SSM; - The rest of the class: 1 × Bofors 57mm Mk.3; 2 × Yugoimport-SDPR M71/08 20mm autocannon; 4 × Exocet MM40 Block III SSM

The Sampari-class fast attack craft are a class of domestically designed and built fast attack craft operated by the Indonesian Navy. The ships also known as KCR-60M (Indonesian: Kapal Cepat Rudal-60 Meter, lit. 'Fast Ship Missile-60 Meter') and all ships built by local company PT PAL Indonesia in Surabaya. These ships are made with composition of aluminium and high-tensile steel in hull parts which are also a domestic product obtained from state-owned foundry PT Krakatau Steel in Cilegon.

== History ==
=== Design problem ===
The Sampari class Batch-I vessels have a relatively weak radar cross section (RCS). The BPPT Indonesia mentioned weaknesses in the shape of the upper building and the hull that were easily detected by enemy radar. The influence of electro-magnetic wave interference on the installation of several communication antennas on the ship will reduce the antenna performance in communication.

For the maneuverability, the Batch-I ships are also considered less reliable to deal with in high waves on the ocean because the ships' size and the lack of fin stabilizer. This reduces the sea state-level capability of the ships. The endurance is also low as the ships can only operate on patrol for eight days.

The engines that powered the initial 2 Batch-I ships were MTU 16V 4000 M73/M73L. These were found to be problematic, underpowered with frequent overheating, especially when FFBNW weapons were installed. They were eventually replaced with more powerful MTU 20V 4000 M73.

The class were also smaller than required by the Indonesia Navy. To overcome these problems, BPPT Indonesia made some recommendations to improve the design of the Batch-II and Batch-III Sampari class.

=== Batch III ===
According to PT PAL, the third batch of KCR-60M comes with several improvements, including in terms of the overall design, hull stability, and a better space/compartment arrangement. PT PAL also stated that it has prepared the KCR Next Generation design that offers a more flexible hull shape, more advanced radar protection, and a maximum speed of 40 knots to better support naval hit and run tactics.

=== Modified variant ===
A variant is under construction by PT Palindo Marine in Batam, Riau Islands, keel laying was held on 12 June 2024. This variant will be powered with a new 4.300 KW/5.766 HP engine and rumored to have a new main gun either OTO Melara 76 mm Super Rapid or MKE 76 mm Naval gun

== Characteristics ==
=== Radars ===
The first two of the Sampari class (Hull 628 & 629) are equipped with Chinese-made SR-47 search radar and TR-47 fire control radar. The later version were equipped with Danish Terma-made SCANTER 4603 X-Band radar and C-Fire electro-optical fire control system.

=== Guns ===
Indonesia originally planned to arm the Sampari class with a 57mm gun as the main armament but due to budget constraints, all four ships were initially armed with a Bofors 40 mm L/70 as the main gun, possibly taken from retired ships like KRI Teluk Semangka (512) LST. For the secondary gun, the ships are armed with two Yugoimport-SDPR M71/08 20mm cannon at the rear. In 2018, there are plan to replace the Bofors 40mm with the Bofors 57mm L/70 Mk.3. It is later confirmed that KRI Sampari (628) and KRI Tombak (629) old 40mm Bofors are going to be replaced with Russian made Burevestnik 57mm AU-220M Naval RCWS, while the following batch that already incorporated with western subsystem and CMS from Terma will use BAE System Bofors 57mm Mk.3 instead. On 2018, KRI Sampari and KRI Tombak were modified to give room for the installation of TR-47C fire control radar behind the main mast and one NG-18 (H/PJ-13) 30mm CIWS at the stern.

=== Missiles ===
The first two of the Sampari class vessels (Hull 628 & 629) are equipped with four C-705 anti-ship missiles. The later batch of this class are fitted with MBDA anti-ship missile solution (Exocet MM40 Block 3).

== Ships of the class ==
Ships	Image	Launched	Commissioned	Yard Number	Notes
Batch I
KRI Sampari (628)		18 December 2013	28 May 2014	W00273	In active service
KRI Tombak (629)		28 May 2014	27 August 2014	W00274	In active service
KRI Halasan (630)		04 July 2014	17 September 2014	W000275	In active service
Batch II
KRI Kerambit (627)		27 February 2018	25 July 2019	W000297	In active service
Batch III
KRI Kapak (625)		05 December 2021	17 May 2023	W000300	In active service
KRI Panah (626)		20 April 2022	17 May 2023	W000301	In active service
