= Indonesian Navy =

Maritime service branch of the Indonesian National Armed Forces

- Tentara Nasional Indonesia Angkatan Laut
- Insignia of Indonesian Navy
- Founded: 10 September 1945; 81 years ago
- Country: Indonesia
- Type: Navy
- Role: Naval warfare
- Size: 80,000 active personnel; 1,034 reserve personnel (Komcad)
- Part of: Indonesian National Armed Forces
- Headquarters: Cilangkap, Jakarta
- Mottos: Jalesveva Jayamahe (Sanskrit, lit. 'Victorious on the Sea')
- Colors: Navy blue
- March: Mars Jalesveva Jayamahe
- Anniversaries: 10 September
- Fleet: 1 Aircraft carrier; 4 Submarines; 2 Submersibles; 10 Frigates; 26 Corvettes; 2 Offshore patrol vessels; 25 Fast attack crafts; 205 Patrol boats; 10 Minesweepers; 13 Tank landing ships; 10 Medium landing ships; 5 Landing platform docks; 1 Command ship; 3 Hospital ships; 9 Training vessels; 7 Hydrographic and Oceanographic Research Vessels; 1 Dry cargo support ship; 5 Replenishment oilers; 2 Troop transports; 16 Tugboats; 5 Hovercraft; 2 Motor yachts
- Engagements: Indonesian National Revolution; Darul Islam rebellion; South Maluku rebellion; PRRI rebellion; Permesta rebellion; Operation Trikora; Konfrontasi; Papua conflict; Communist insurgency in Sarawak; Indonesian Invasion of East Timor; Insurgency in Aceh; MV Sinar Kudus hijacking; Operation Madago Raya
- Website: www.tnial.mil.id

Commanders
- Commander-in-Chief of the Armed Forces: President Prabowo Subianto
- Chief of Staff of the Navy: Admiral Muhammad Ali
- Deputy Chief of Staff of the Navy: Vice Admiral Edwin
- Inspector General of the Navy: Vice Admiral Achmad Wibisono
- Coordinator of the Navy Advisory Staff: Rear Admiral Kris Wibowo
- Notable commanders: Rear Admiral Mas Pardi; Admiral R. E. Martadinata

Insignia
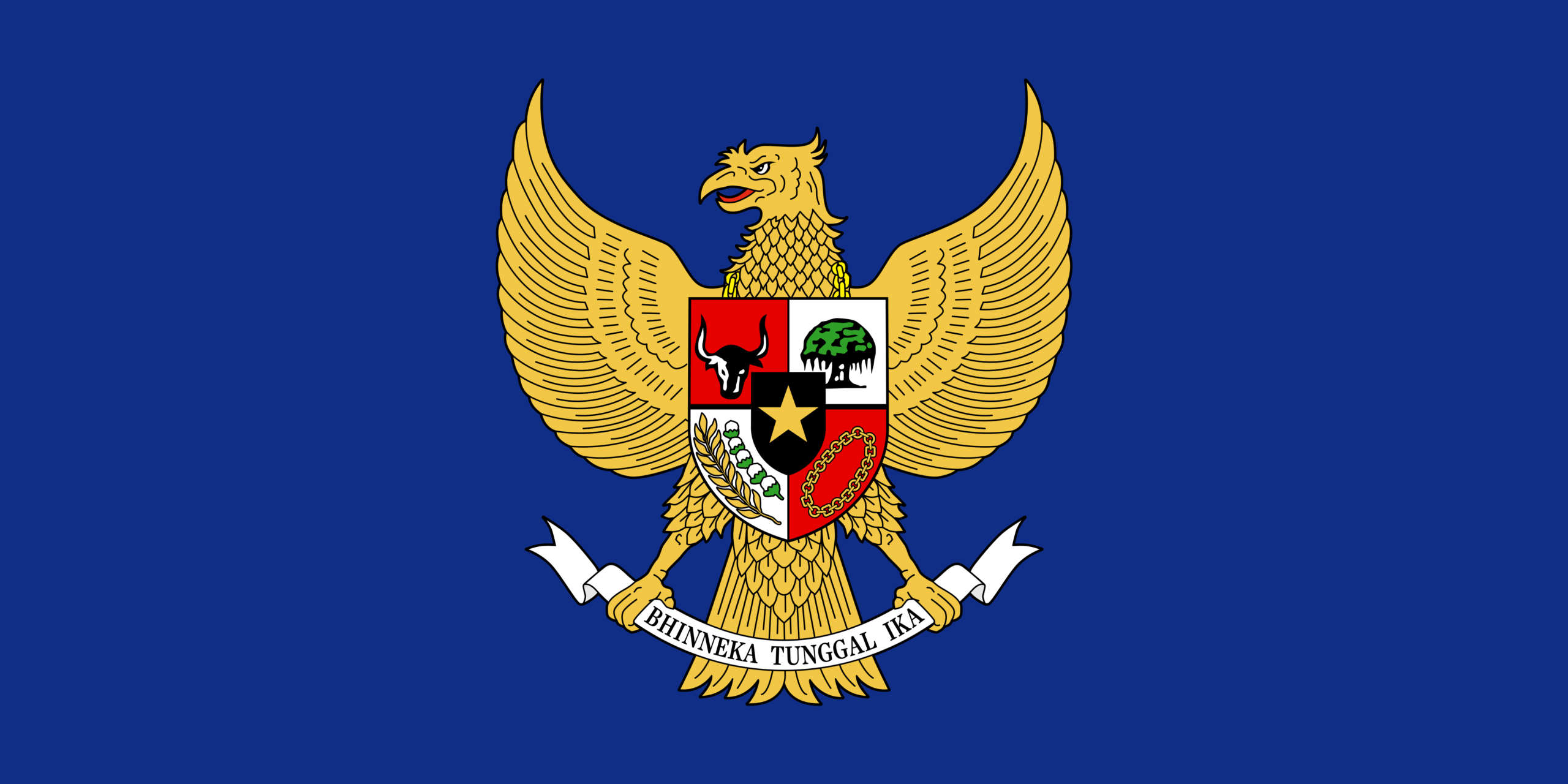
- Flag: Reverse

- Jack

- Naval aviation roundel

- Pennant

- Ensign & fin flash

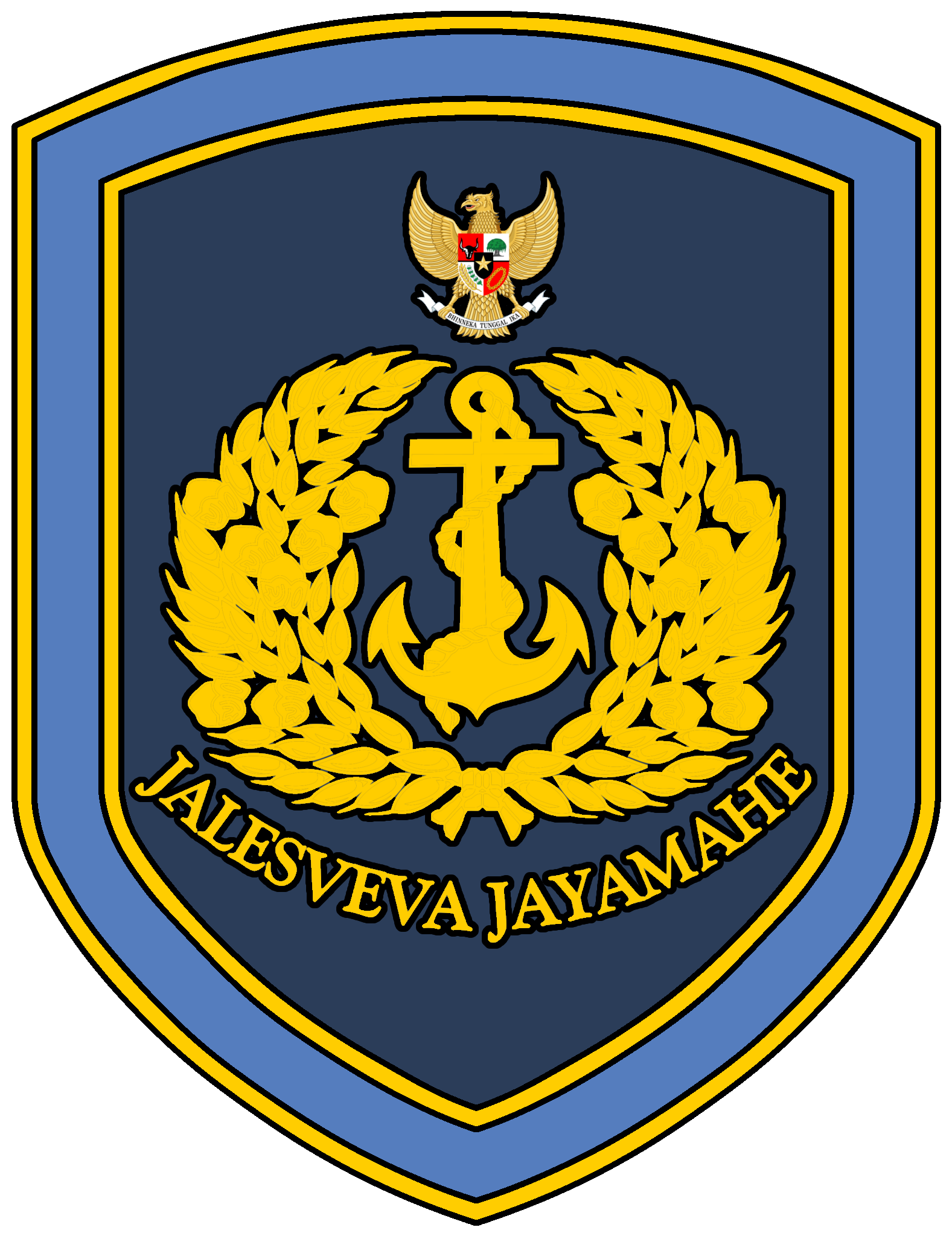
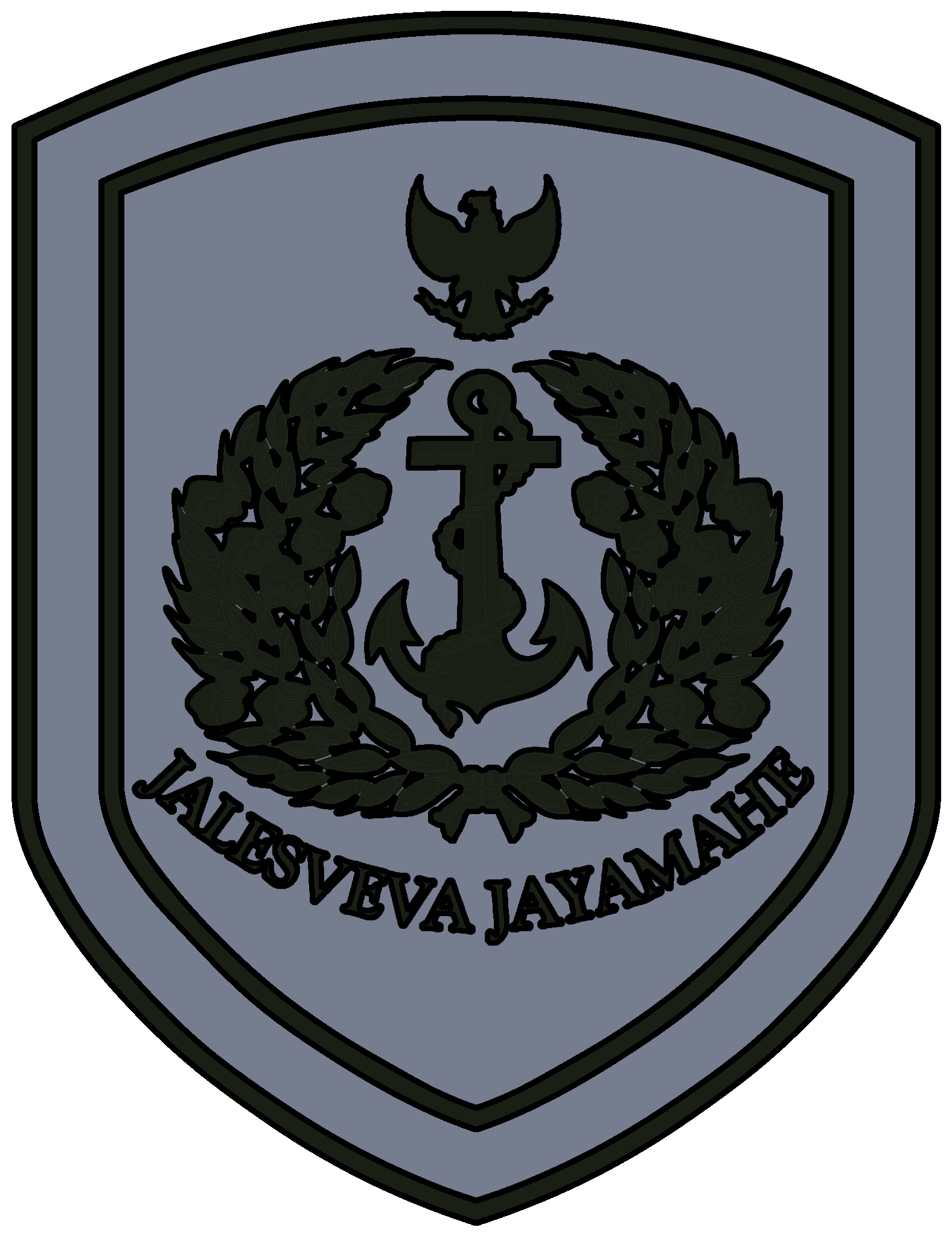
- Headquarters insignia

The Indonesian Navy (Indonesian: Tentara Nasional Indonesia Angkatan Laut, lit. 'Indonesian National Military Sea Force', TNI-AL) is the naval branch of the Indonesian National Armed Forces. It was founded on 10 September 1945 and has a role to patrol Indonesia's lengthy coastline, to enforce and patrol the territorial waters and Exclusive Economic Zone (EEZ) of Indonesia, to protect Indonesia's maritime strategic interests, to protect the islands surrounding Indonesia, and to defend against seaborne threats.

The Navy is headed by the Chief of Staff of the Navy (Kepala Staf Angkatan Laut – KSAL or KASAL). The Indonesian Navy consists of three major fleets known as "Armada", which are Komando Armada I (1st Fleet Command) located in Tanjung Uban, Komando Armada II (2nd Fleet Command) located in Surabaya, Komando Armada III (3rd Fleet Command) located in Sorong, and one Komando Lintas Laut Militer (Military Sealift Command). The Navy also heads the Marine Corps.

== Mission ==
According to Article 9 of Law No.34/2004 on the National Armed Forces, the Navy has the following tasks:

1. perform military duties in national defence;
2. enforce the law and secure order in the sea area of national jurisdiction in accordance with national laws and ratified international laws;
3. perform diplomatic duties in support of foreign policy set by the government;
4. engage in other duties relevant to the maintenance and development of naval power;
5. support civilian empowerment in sea defence areas.

== History ==
=== Creation and actions during the revolution ===
The Indonesian Navy's official history began on 10 September 1945, at the outset of the Indonesian National Revolution. The administration of the early Indonesian government established the People's Marine Security Agency (Badan Keamanan Rakyat Laut/BKR Laut) on 22 August 1945, the predecessor to the modern Indonesian Navy. BKR Laut with only wooden ships, a few landing craft, and weapons left by Japan, was initially composed of Indonesian sailors who had served in the ranks of the Royal Netherlands Navy during the Dutch colonial period, and who had fought the Japanese during the years of military occupation, plus active militias who served with the Japanese and ex-Indonesian officers and ratings of the Imperial Japanese Navy. The formation of the Indonesian military organization known as the People's Security Army (Tentara Keamanan Rakyat/TKR) on 5 October 1945, at the height of the National Revolution, helped spur the further existence of the TKR Naval Branch – the Peoples' Security Navy (TLKR), which later became the Republic of Indonesia Navy (Angkatan Laut Republik Indonesia / ALRI). The name ALRI was used until 1970, when it was changed to Tentara Nasional Indonesia Angkatan Laut (TNI-AL).

As the revolution grew, and the Navy began its work, naval bases were established throughout the archipelago. Former ships of the Imperial Japanese Navy handed down to the new republic were acquired. Simple strength did not discourage the Navy from deploying Sea Traffic Operations in order to spread the news of the proclamation and help to form and train Republican military forces and militias nationwide. Besides, they also attempted to breach the Dutch naval blockade in order to obtain aid from abroad.

The newly formed navy confronted the more superior Royal Netherlands Navy in Bali, Sibolga, and Cirebon. Cross-sea operations are also able to prepare the armed forces in South Kalimantan, Bali, and Sulawesi. Limitations in strength and ability to lead the Navy had to divert the struggle in the countryside after most boats were sunk and nearly all bases battered by the Dutch and Allied military forces. But the determination to participate again in the sea never subsided. In the hard times during the National Revolution, the Navy succeeded in forming the Fleet Forces (CA), Marine Corps (Corps Mariniers/ CM), and educational institutions in various places. The formation of these elements marks the presence of aspects for the formation of a modern national navy.

=== After the revolution ===
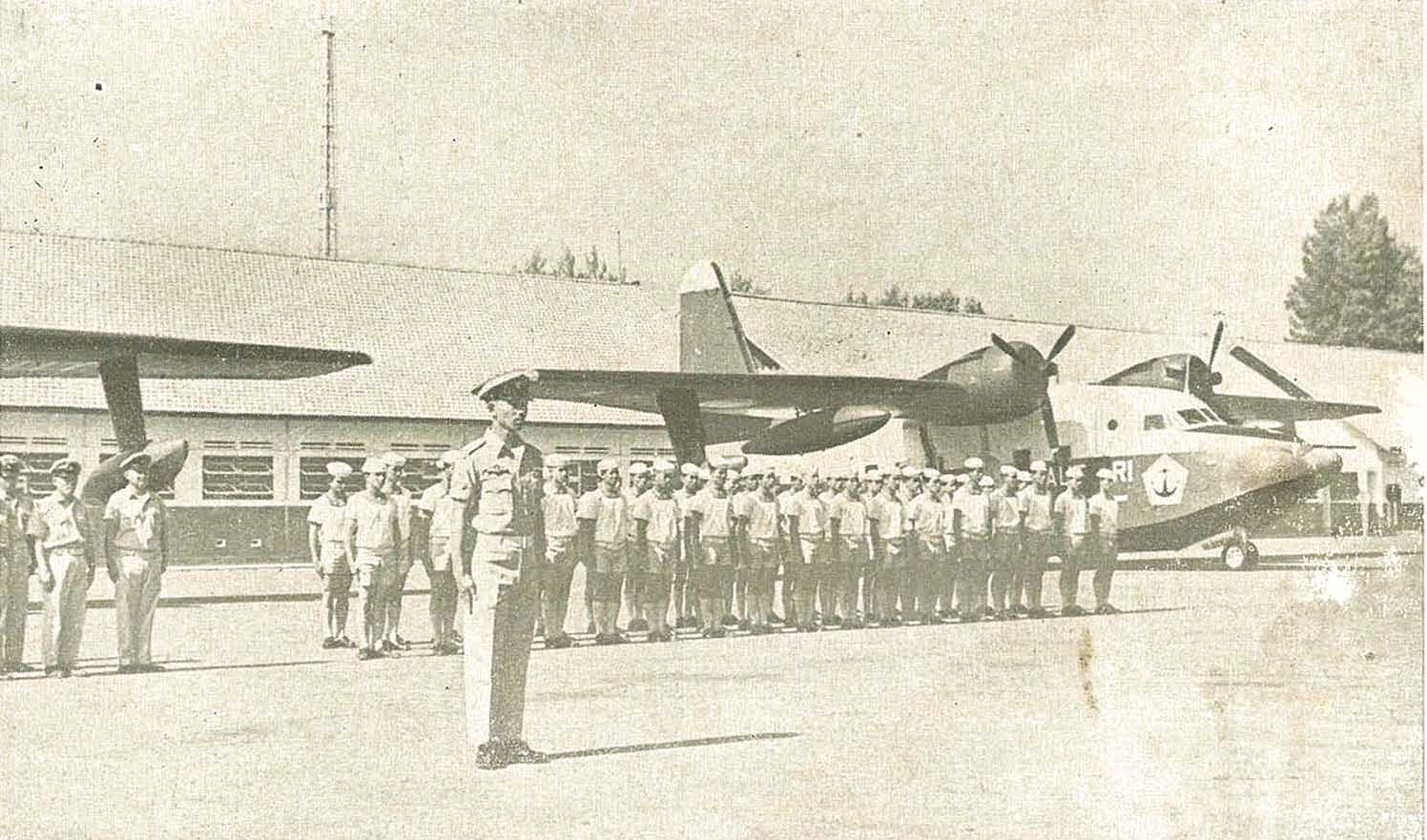
Grumman HU-16 Albatross of the naval aviation, 1950s–1960s

The end of the War of Independence marked the development of the Navy as a modern naval power. In accordance to the results of the Round Table Conference, in 1949, the Navy received a variety of war equipment such as warships and its supporting facilities such as naval bases. This step came along with the process of consolidation within the Navy, revamping the organization and recruitment of personnel through educational institutions before manning naval equipment. During 1949–1959, the Indonesian Navy managed to enhance its strength and improve its capabilities. In the field of organization the navy reorganized its Fleet Forces, the Marine Corps – then Korps Komando Angkatan Laut (KKO-AL – Naval Commando Corps Command), naval aviation and a number of regions as territorial defence command aspects of the sea. Naval combat equipment grew, both from former Dutch equipment handed down to the new republic and through purchase from other countries.

With the increased strength and the capability, the Navy began refining the strategy, tactics, and techniques of marine operations, which are directly applied in a variety of military operations in order to deal with separatist movements that have sprung up in the year from 1950 to 1959. In operations against PRRI in Sumatra, Permesta, Darul Islam in West Java, and RMS in the Moluccas, the Navy gained lessons in applying the concept of marine operations, amphibious operations, and joint operations with other forces.

=== At the height of the Cold War ===
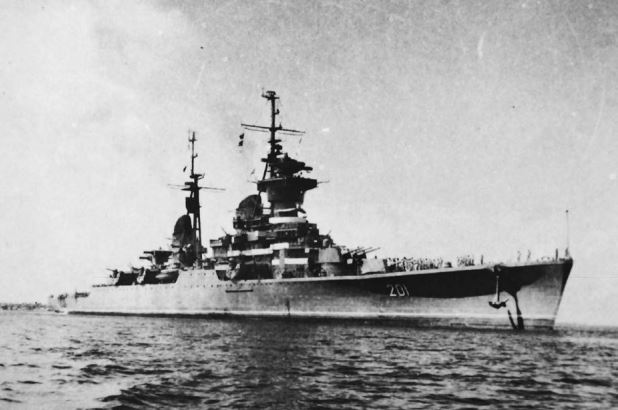
Soviet-built cruiser RI Irian (201)

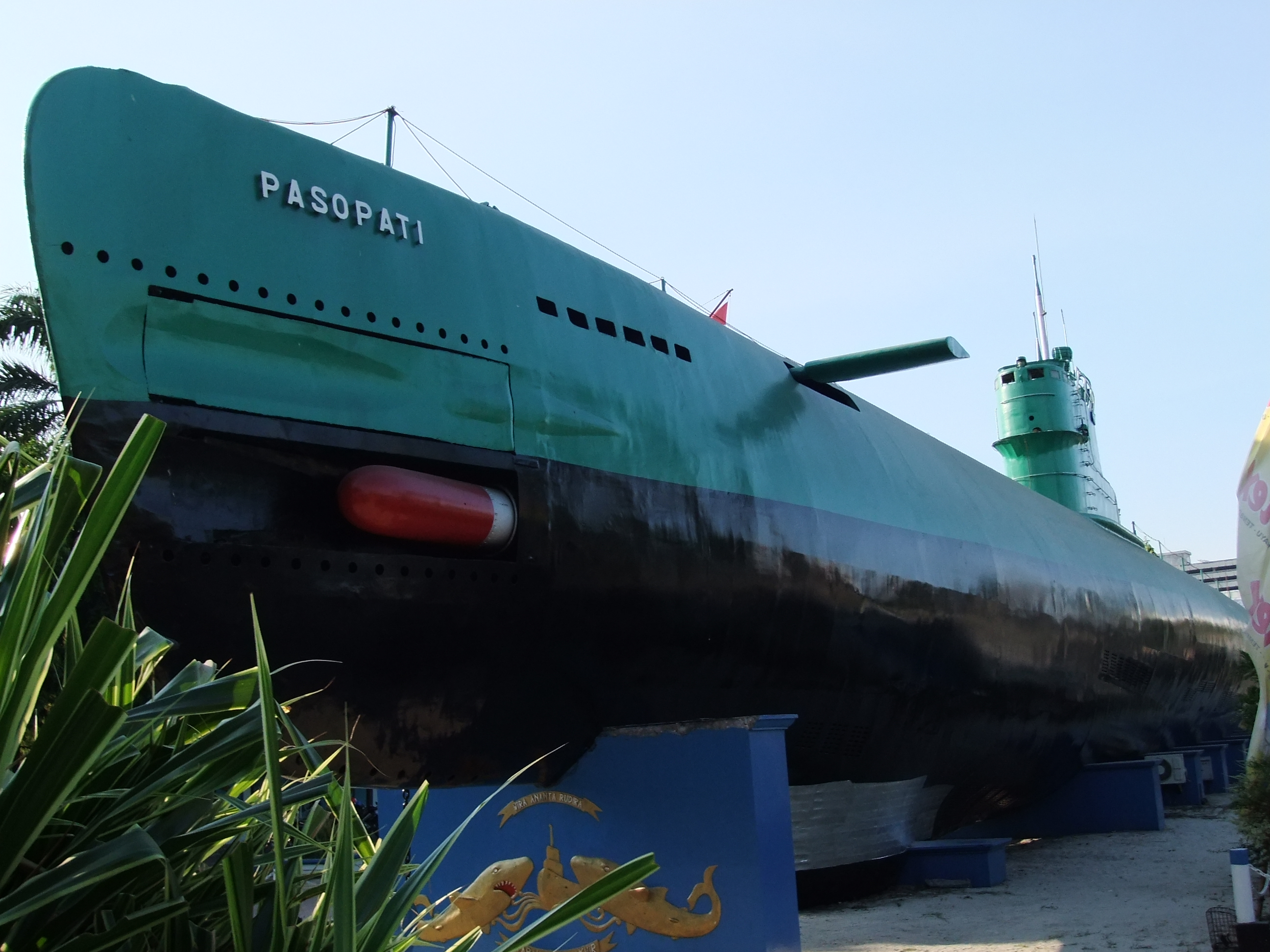
KRI Pasopati, a Whiskey-class submarine which is now a museum ship

At the time the country started to recover from the threat of disintegration, in 1959, the Navy launched a program known as Menuju Angkatan Laut yang Jaya (rough translation – "Towards A Distinguished Navy"). The Navy experienced a significant progress until 1965 which was motivated by the politics of confrontation in order to seize West Irian, which Indonesia claimed as part of its territory, a claim refuted by the Dutch government. As part of the increasing military ties between Indonesia and the Warsaw Pact, various naval combat equipments from Eastern European countries strengthened the Navy and become the dominant force at the time. Some military equipment of Soviet production served in the ranks of the Navy, among others Sverdlov-class cruiser, Skoryy-class destroyer, Riga-class frigate, Whiskey-class submarine (the first such vessels to be used in Southeast Asia), Komar-class missile boat, Ilyushin Il-28 long-range bomber aircraft of Naval Aviation and the PT-76 Amphibious light tanks, BTR-50 APCs and BM-14 MRLs (Southeast Asia's first ever MRL system in service) of the Commando Corps, the first of their kind in the region. With such power in the era of the 1960s the Navy was called the largest Navy in Southeast Asia and one of the strongest within the Asia-Pacific, outranking those of its neighbours in armament and prestige.

By January 1962 the Indonesian Navy started preparing several naval operations for the liberation of West Irian known as Operation Trikora, which began on 15 December the year before as part of the military component of that operation under the Mandala Command for the Liberation of West Irian (Komando Mandala Pembebasan Irian Barat) . Beginning 1 January, fast-ship torpedo vessels of the Navy were forward deployed to deal with destroyers, frigates and aircraft of the Royal Netherlands Navy. On January 15, 1962, Commodore Yos Sudarso along with RI Matjan Tutul sank in the sea battle in the Arafura Sea. This battle is known as the Vlakke Hoek incident. By mid-year the Navy was preparing to organize its role in the planned Operation Jayawijaya which would have been the largest amphibious operation in the history of Indonesian military operations if commenced. The naval component was made up of 100 warships and 16,000 sailors and Marines. The deployment of forces preparatory to the planned landings in West Papua forced the Dutch to return to negotiations and reached an agreement to hand over West Irian to Indonesia.

After seizing West Irian, Sukarno by 1963 moved his sights on Malaysia. Indonesia political confrontation against Neocolonialism and Imperialism (Nekolim) continued in Operation Dwikora to oppose the formation of Malaysia. Although elements of the National Armed Forces were prepared for operational deployments to the new state, the operations were limited to the infiltration operation along the Borneo frontier. Soldiers from the marine corps were involved in the operations which targeted both the Malaysian states of Sabah and Sarawak. The Marine Corps, though, would figure in the 1964 MacDonald House bombing in Singapore.

=== 1965 onwards ===
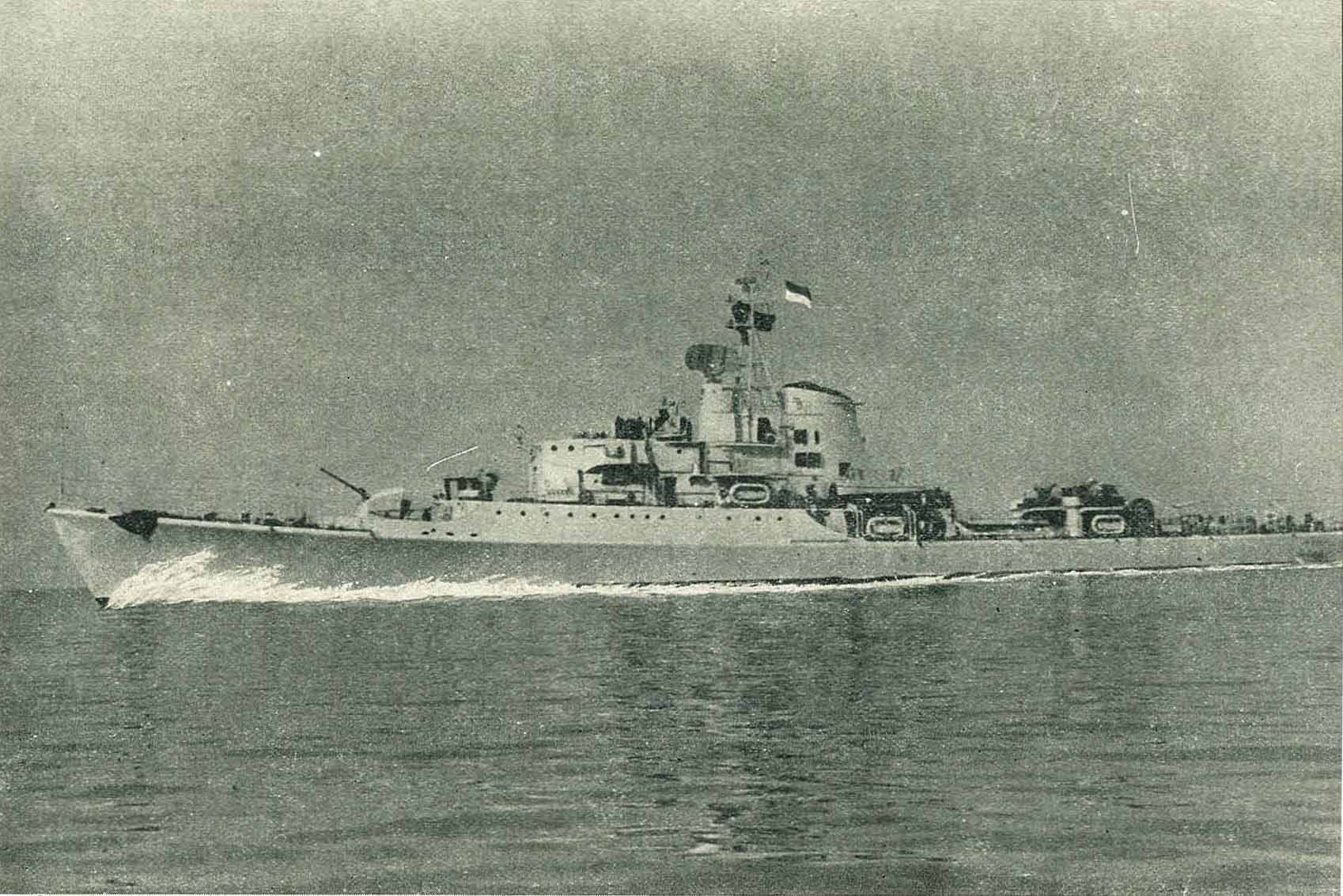
An Indonesian Imam Bondjol-class in late 1950s

Operation Dwikora was discontinued in 1965 along with a succession of governments in Indonesia after an abortive coup d'état took place in Jakarta, which were organized by the self-proclaimed organization of Indonesian National Armed Forces members who, in the early hours of 1 October 1965, assassinated six Indonesian Army generals and killed 3 more. Since 1966, the Navy experienced a new chapter in its history as the military integration efforts. With the integration of the armed forces organizationally and operationally been able to keep up on the implementation of tasks in the field of defence and security so doctrinally, the direction of development of the power and capabilities of each branch to be concentrated. The operations were prominent during the period of the 1970s was Operation Seroja in the framework of the integration of East Timor to Indonesia. The Navy played an active role in the operation of landings, a joint ground operation, and transporting troops by sea.

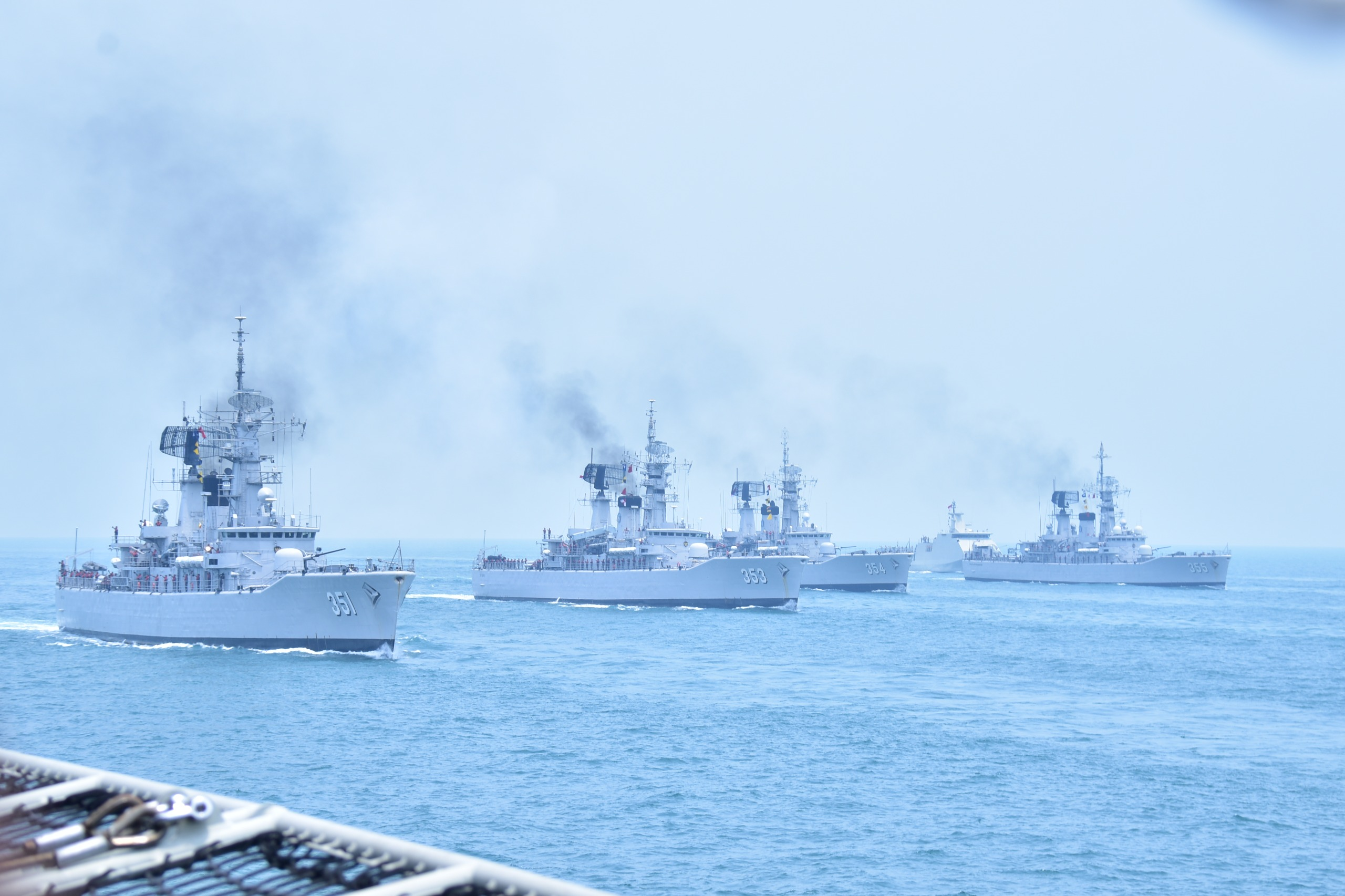
Ahmad Yani-class frigates during a sailing pass

Starting the 1980s the Navy began to modernize combat equipment. Ships made in Eastern Europe that has been the core strength of the Navy in the era of the 1960s and 1970s were not suited to meet the growing and changing needs for the navy and its branches (saving for its submarines and several corvettes and frigates, the submarines were retired in 1990). The worsening relations between Indonesia and the Soviet Union after the overthrow of President Sukarno resulted a cessation of military cooperation between the two countries and the Warsaw Pact. Therefore, the Navy switched once more to using Western technology to modernize the power and ability to buy warships, logistics vessels and other major combat equipment from various countries. Included among those commissioned during the Suharto presidency were Fatahillah-class corvette and Ahmad Yani-class frigate from the Netherlands, Cakra-class submarine from West Germany, fast patrol boat from South Korea, and the GAF Nomad patrol aircraft from Australia. In 1993 the Navy also received 39 ships from the former Volksmarine (East German Navy), including 16 Parchim-class corvettes, 14 Frosch-class landing ship tanks (LSTs), and 9 Kondor II-class minessweepers. Aside from these the Navy reorganized its forces. In 1984, as part of an-Armed Forces wide unit reorganization, the former Naval Regions, which in turn governed Naval Bases and Naval Districts and subordinate Naval Stations and Naval Air Stations, were turned into Main Naval Bases of the Navy Fleet Commands, divided from the formerly unified National Fleet Command on the basis of the Western and Eastern Squadrons of the Fleet. The National Fleet Command by the late 1960s was briefly split into two operational fleets – the Ocean Fleet Force (for defence operations abroad) and the Archipelago Fleet (for local defence operations within Indonesia), until these were fused into a unified command in 1970.

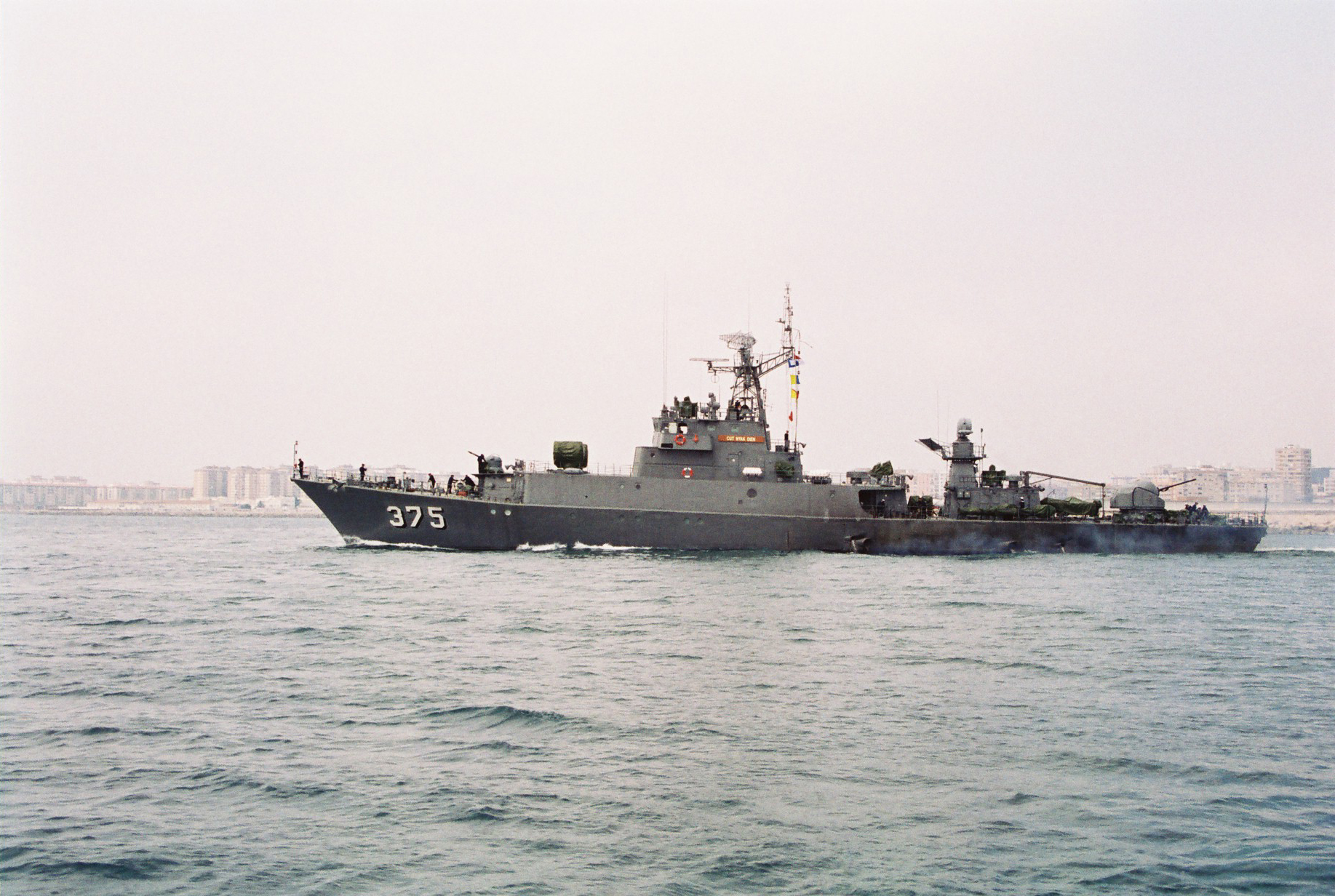
KRI Cut Nyak Dhien (375)

At the same time the Navy began to develop a non-combat military operations in the form of humanitarian service program Surya Bhaskara Jaya in various remote areas in Indonesia that can only be reached by sea. The core of the operating activities are health services, construction and rehabilitation of public facilities and various counselling in health, law, and civil defence. This event is held regularly every year until now. A number of countries also participated in these activities, among others, Singapore, Australia and the United States. The navy also seeks promoting the development of the maritime sector, especially those related to aspects of defence and security at sea, activities that had been present since independence before the formation of the Ministry of Maritime Affairs and Fisheries. The actual activities undertaken today by the Navy are establishing marine development assessment bodies together with the government and private sectors in some areas, coastal village pilot programs are summarized in Coastal Rural Development (Bindesir), and the National Potential Development Program for Maritime Defense (Binpotnaskuatmar). In order to encourage the spirit of the seafaring nation, the Navy held an international scale maritime event Arung Samudera 1995. The navy was responsible for the programs for National Maritime Year 1996 and the Bunaken Declaration of 1998, which is a manifestation of marine development in Indonesia.

=== Expansion in the 21st century ===
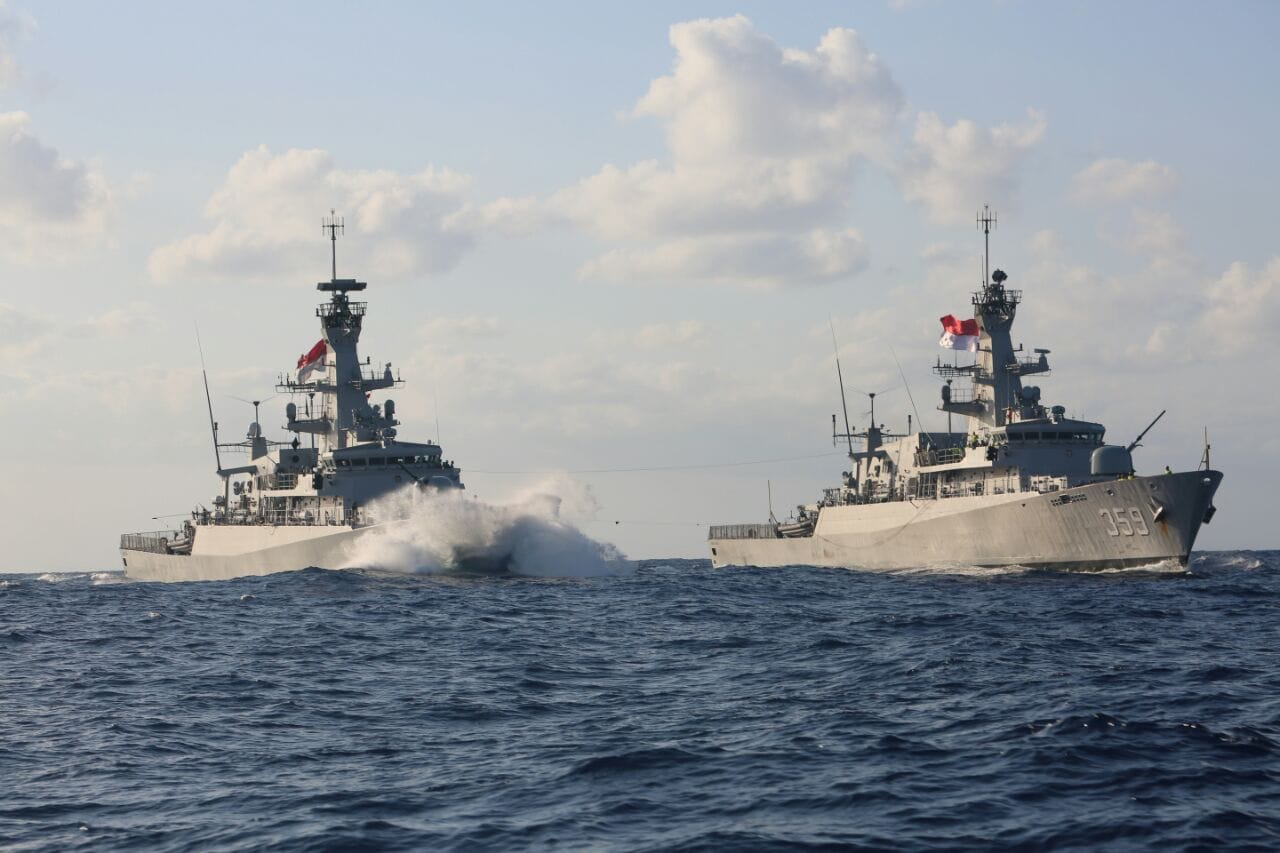
KRI Bung Tomo (357) & KRI Usman Harun (359) of the Bung Tomo-class

During the presidencies of Susilo Bambang Yudhoyono and Joko Widodo, the Navy has begun a program of expansion of its combat commands and has begun a program of national warship construction in naval arsenals, while acquiring nationally produced transport aircraft for the needs of the Navy, a program that has continued during the presidency of Prabowo Subianto, which saw the Navy finally joining the ranks of aircraft carrier operators globally.

One example of such successes in naval shipbuilding was when on December 17, 2024, Indonesian Navy Chief of Staff Admiral Muhammad Ali was the guest of honor in the commissioning ceremony of two Fast Patrol Warships (PC 60), KRI Hampala-880 and KRI Lumba-Lumba-881, in Sunda Kelapa Pier, North Jakarta. The ships were produced for the Navy by domestic shipbuilder PT. Caputra Mitra Sejati.

== Organization ==
According to Presidential Regulation No. 84/2025 on the Organization of the Indonesian National Armed Forces, the organizational structure of the navy comprises the following components:

=== Leadership Elements ===
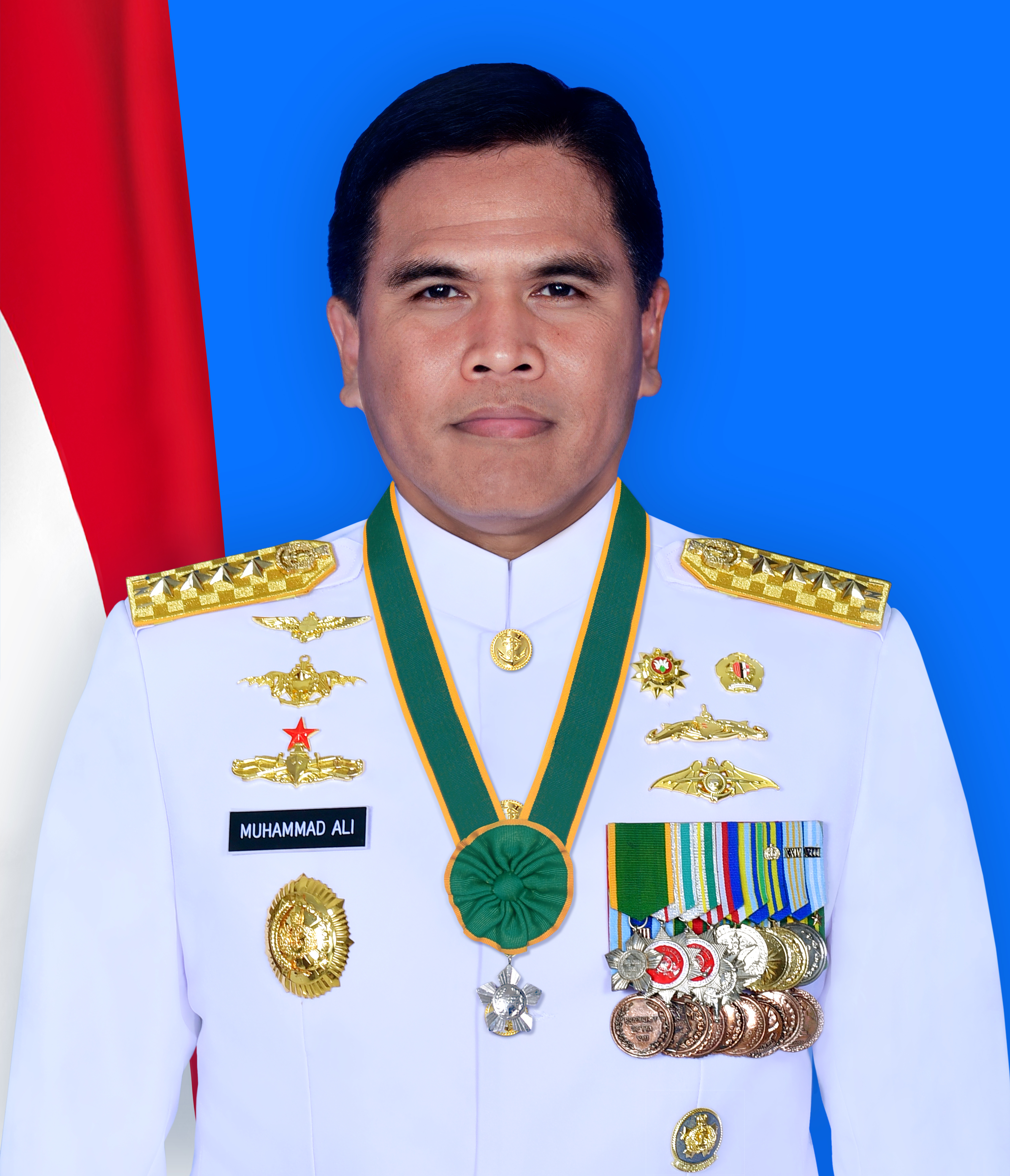
- The current Chief of Staff of the Navy, Laksamana (Admiral) Muhammad Ali
  Chief of Staff of the Navy (Kepala Staf Angkatan Laut), position held by a four-star Admiral or Marine General; and
- Deputy Chief of Staff of the Navy (Wakil Kepala Staf Angkatan Laut), position held by a three-star Vice Admiral or Marine Lieutenant General.

=== Leadership support elements ===
The following positions of the leadership support are equivalent to a naval Staff organization.

1. Inspectorate General of the Navy (Inspektorat Jenderal TNI Angkatan Laut), position held by a 3-star Vice Admiral;
2. Advisory Staff Offices to the Navy Chief of Staff (Staf Ahli Kepala Staf Angkatan Laut);
3. Naval Planning and Budgeting Staff (Staf Perencanaan dan Anggaran TNI Angkatan Laut);
4. Naval Intelligence Staff (Staf Intelijen TNI Angkatan Laut);
5. Naval Operations Staff (Staf Operasi TNI Angkatan Laut);
6. Naval Personnel Staff (Staf Personalia TNI Angkatan Laut);
7. Naval Logistics Staff (Staf Logistik TNI Angkatan Laut);
8. Naval Territorial Staff (Staf Teritorial TNI Angkatan Laut); and
9. Naval Communication and Electronic Affairs Staff (Staf Komunikasi dan Elektronika TNI Angkatan Laut).

=== Service element ===
- Navy Headquarters Detachment (Detasemen Markas Besar TNI Angkatan Laut), in charge of managing the internal affairs, personnel, logistics, and finance in support of the Navy Headquarters, led by a 1-star Commodore or Marine Brigadier General.

=== Central Executive Agencies ===
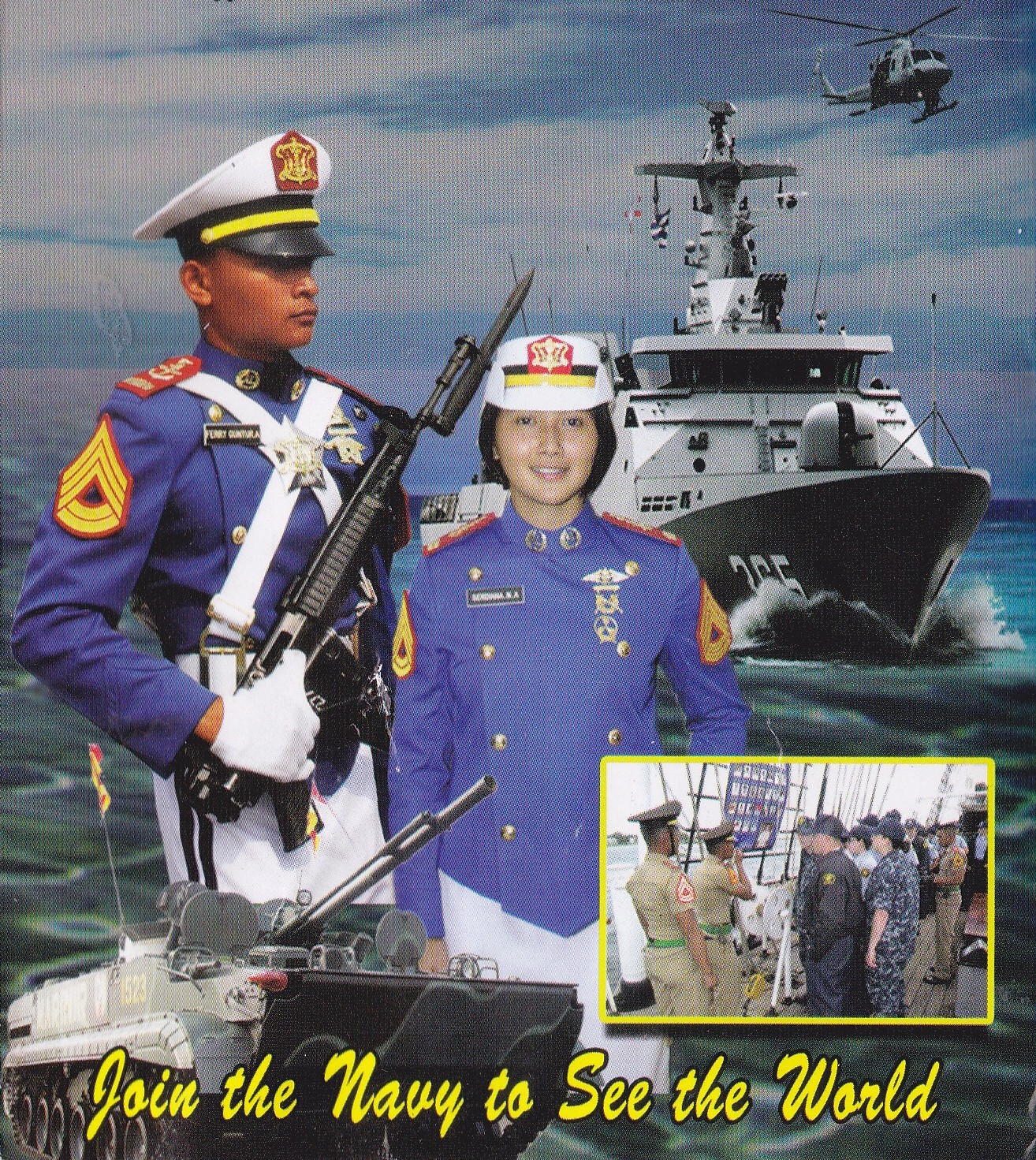
An Indonesian Naval Academy recruiting poster

The following agencies are central executive agencies, directly subordinated under the Navy Headquarters.

Academies and Colleges

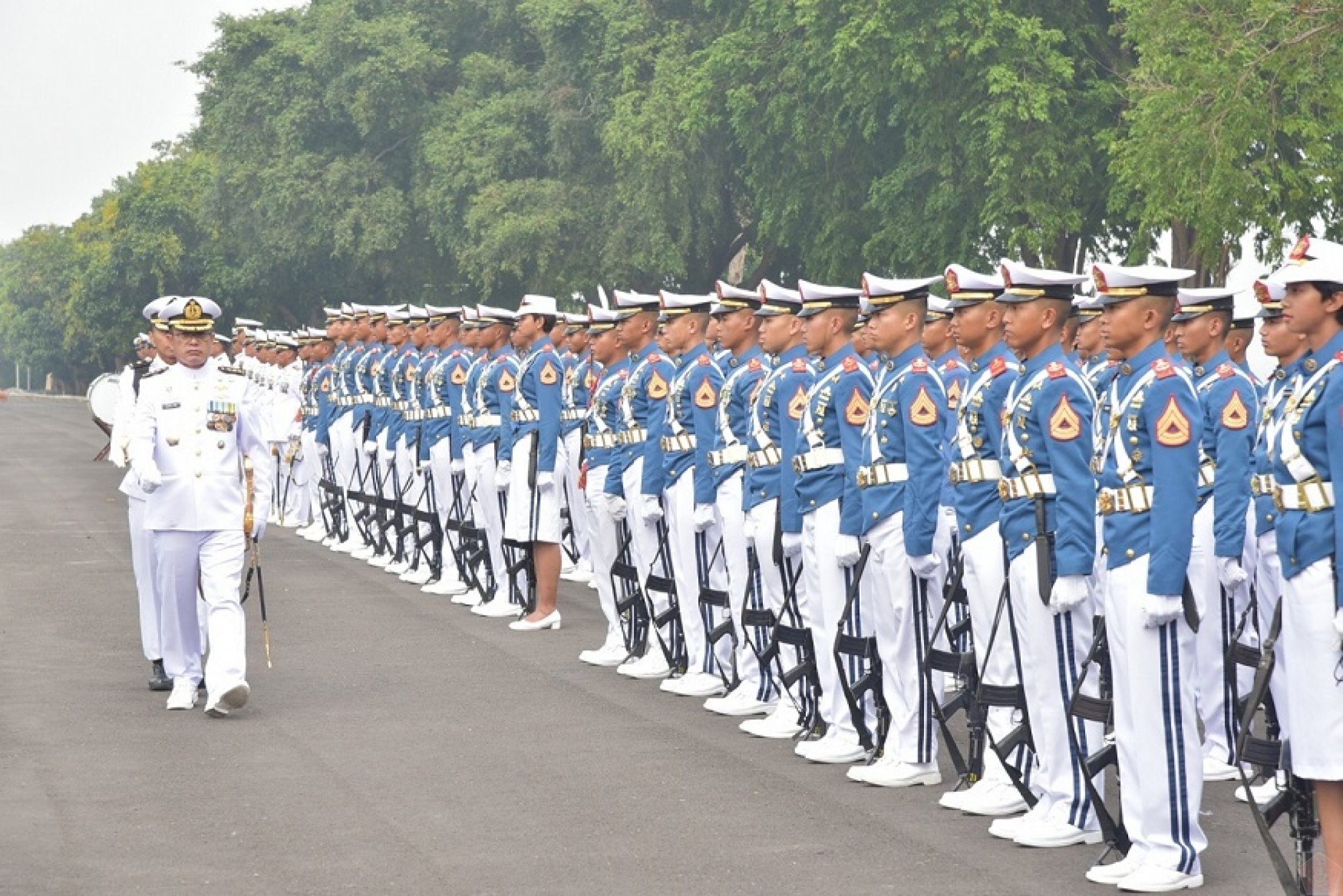
1. Cadets of the Indonesian Naval Academy
  Naval Academy (Akademi TNI Angkatan Laut), led by an Academy Governor with a rank of 2-star Rear Admiral;
2. Naval Staff and Command College (Sekolah Staf dan Komando Angkatan Laut), led by a Staff and Command College Commandant with a rank of 2-star Rear Admiral; and
3. Naval Technological College (Sekolah Tinggi Teknologi TNI Angkatan Laut), led by a College Commandant with a rank of 2-star Rear Admiral.

Centers

1. Naval Aviation Center (Pusat Penerbangan Angkatan Laut), led by a 2-star Naval/Marine Officer;
2. Naval Military Police Center (Pusat Polisi Militer TNI Angkatan Laut), led by a 2-star Naval/Marine Officer;
3. Naval Medical Center (Pusat Kesehatan TNI Angkatan Laut), led by a 2-star Naval/Marine Officer, which directly oversee:
  - dr. Ramelan Central Naval Hospital, and
  - Raden Eddy Martadinata Naval Dentistry Institute.
4. Naval Materiel Worthiness and Occupational Safety Center (Pusat Kelaikan Materiel dan Keselamatan Kerja TNI Angkatan Laut), led by a 1-star Navy Commodore/Marine Brigadier General;
5. Naval Intelligence Center (Pusat Intelijen TNI Angkatan Laut), led by a 1-star Naval/Marine Officer;
6. Naval Territorial Center (Pusat Teritorial TNI Angkatan Laut), led by a 1-star Naval/Marine Officer; and
7. Naval Cyber Center (Pusat Siber TNI Angkatan Laut), led by a 1-star Naval/Marine Officer.

Services

1. Naval Public Relations Service (Dinas Penerangan TNI Angkatan Laut), led by a 1-star Naval/Marine Officer;
2. Naval Communications and Electronic Service (Dinas Komunikasi dan Elektronika TNI Angkatan Laut), led by a 1-star Naval/Marine Officer;
3. Naval Justice Service (Dinas Hukum TNI Angkatan Laut), led by a 1-star Naval/Marine Officer;
4. Naval Operations and Training Service (Dinas Operasi dan Latihan TNI Angkatan Laut), led by a 1-star Naval/Marine Officer;
5. Naval Personnel Administration Service (Dinas Administrasi Personal TNI Angkatan Laut), led by a 1-star Naval/Marine Officer;
6. Naval Education Service (Dinas Pendidikan TNI Angkatan Laut), led by a 1-star Naval/Marine Officer;
7. Naval Personnel Maintenance Service (Dinas Perawatan Personel TNI Angkatan Laut), led by a 1-star Naval/Marine Officer;
8. Naval Materiel Service (Dinas Materiil TNI Angkatan Laut), led by a 1-star Naval/Marine Officer;
9. Naval Weapons and Electronics Materiel Service (Dinas Materiil Senjata dan Elektronika TNI Angkatan Laut), led by a 1-star Naval/Marine Officer;
10. Naval Base Facilities Service (Dinas Fasilitas Pangkalan TNI Angkatan Laut), led by a 1-star Naval/Marine Officer;
11. Naval Procurement Service (Dinas Pengadaan TNI Angkatan Laut), led by a 1-star Naval/Marine Officer;
12. Naval Logistics Service (Dinas Pembekalan TNI Angkatan Laut), led by a 1-star Naval/Marine Officer;
13. Naval Finance Service (Dinas Keuangan TNI Angkatan Laut), led by a 1-star Naval/Marine Officer, led by a 1-star Naval/Marine Officer;
14. Naval Research and Development Service (Dinas Penelitian dan Pengembangan TNI Angkatan Laut), led by a 1-star Naval/Marine Officer;
15. Naval Information and Data Processing Service (Dinas Informasi dan Pengolahan Data TNI Angkatan Laut), led by a 1-star Naval/Marine Officer;
16. Naval Psychology Service (Dinas Psikologi TNI Angkatan Laut), led by a 1-star Naval/Marine Officer;
17. Naval Historical Heritage Service (Dinas Sejarah TNI Angkatan Laut), led by a 1-star Naval/Marine Officer;
18. Naval Mental Guidance and Chaplaincy Service (Dinas Pembinaan Mental TNI Angkatan Laut), led by a 1-star Naval/Marine Officer; and
19. Naval Procurement Service (Dinas Pelayanan Pengadaan Barang/Jasa TNI Angkatan Laut), led by a 1-star Naval/Marine Officer.

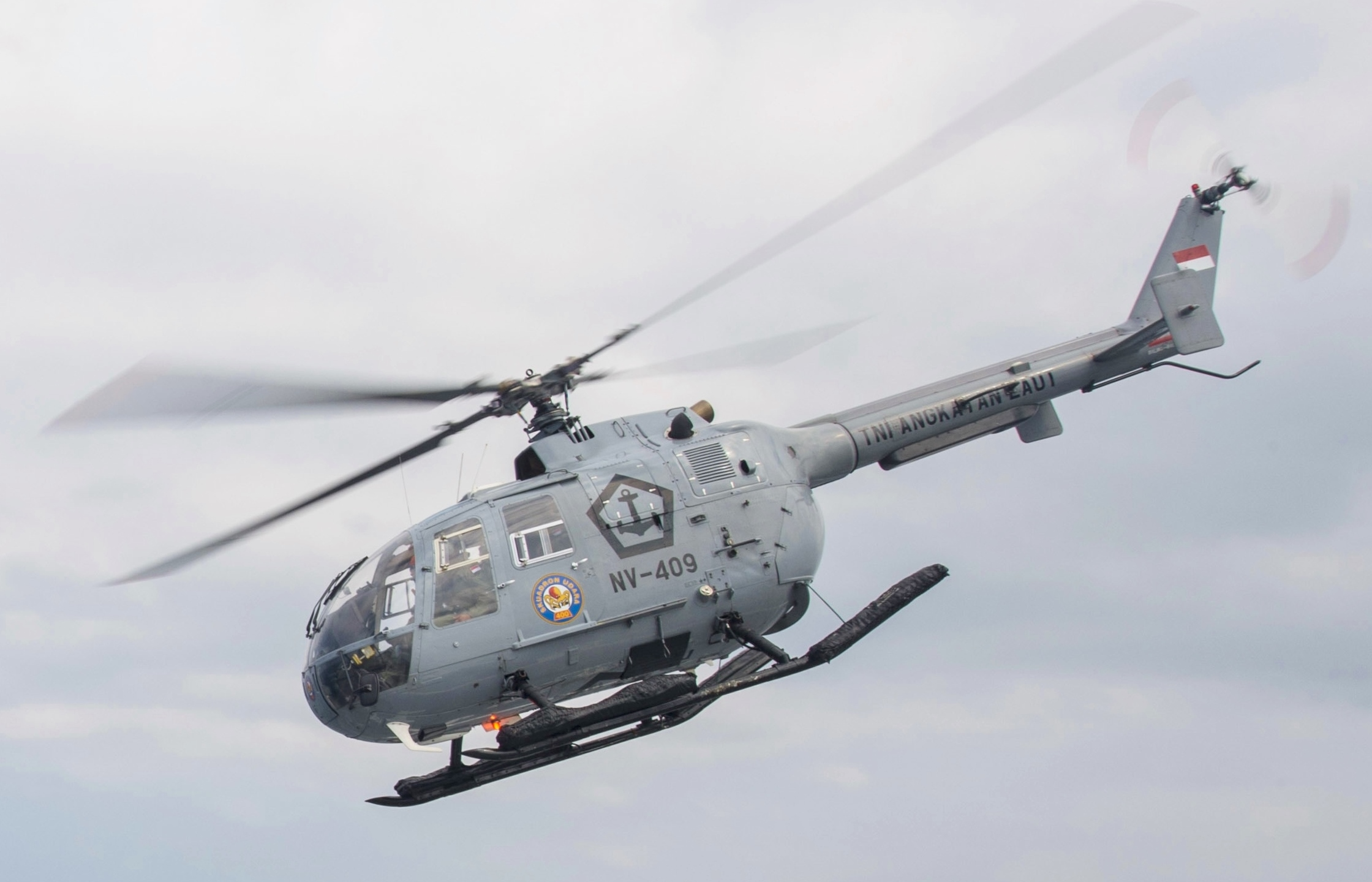
MBB Bo 105 of the Naval Aviation landing on the flight deck of USS Fort Worth

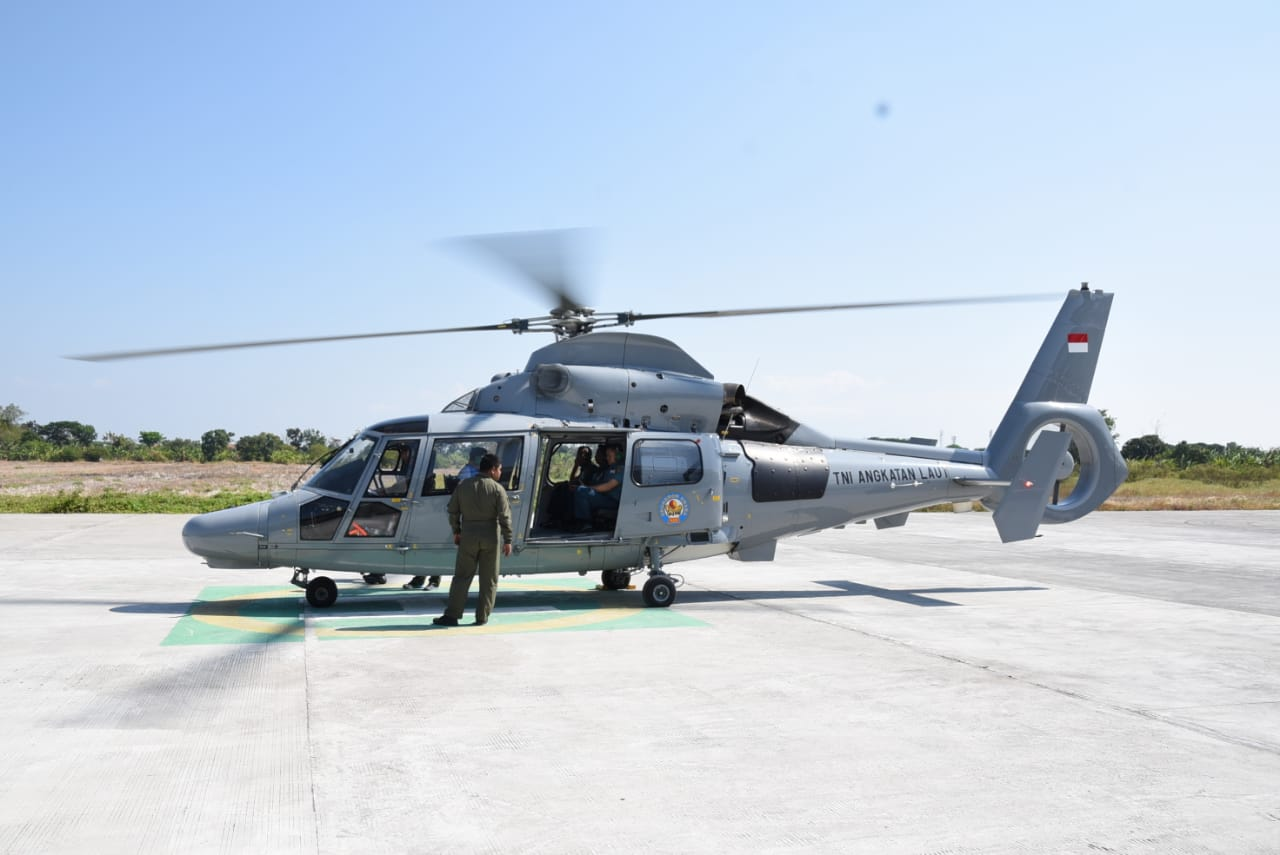
Indonesian Naval Aviation Eurocopter AS565 Panther ASW Helicopter

Naval Aviation

The Indonesian Naval Aviation Center (Pusat Penerbangan Angkatan Laut – Puspenerbal) is a part of the Navy's Central Executive Agencies led by a Rear Admiral. Puspenerbal serves as the centre of guidance to the Navy's aviation units in regards to personnel as well as the readiness of air elements in support of the Navy. Puspenerbal operates both combat and logistic units that work in tanget with both the Navy itself and the Marine Corps; these units perform multitudes of operations which include air surveillance, anti-submarine, fast logistics support, maritime patrol, marine combat operations, and the provision of material coaching functions. Outside of military operations Puspenerbal also conducts SAR operations, and humanitarian relief operations. Other than that, monitoring the movement of foreign ships, especially in the archipelagic sea lanes of Indonesia, environmental protection from the pollution of dangerous materials, and the prevention of smuggling and theft of marine wealth are also an important mission carried by Puspenerbal, these are done in coordination with other similar aviation elements such as the Indonesian Air Force and Indonesian Police. One notable act of Navy aircraft in the 21st century was when they were involved in evacuating victims of the 2006 Yogyakarta earthquake.

=== Principal Commands under the Navy Chief of Staff ===
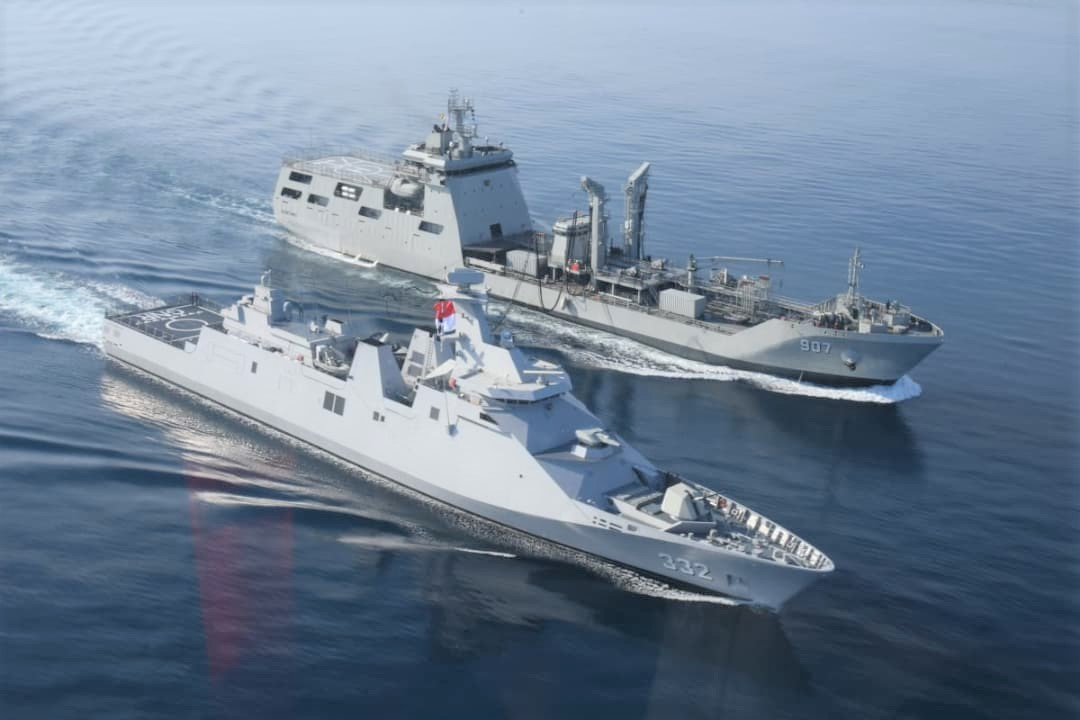
KRI I Gusti Ngurah Rai (332) and KRI Bontang (907) performing replenishment at sea

1. Indonesian Fleet Command (Komando Armada Republik Indonesia – Koarmada RI). The Indonesian Fleet Command is led by a three-star Vice Admiral and responsible for all the three fleet commands.
  - 1st Fleet Command (Komando Armada I – Koarmada I) based in Tanjung Uban, Bintan Regency in Riau Islands.
  - 2nd Fleet Command (Komando Armada II – Koarmada II) based in Surabaya.
  - 3rd Fleet Command (Komando Armada 3 – Koarmada 3) based in Sorong.
2. Naval Hydro-Oceanographic Center (Pusat Hidro-Oseanografi TNI Angkatan Laut).
3. Naval Doctrine, Education, and Training Development Command (Komando Pengembangan Doktrin, Pendidikan, dan Latihan TNI Angkatan Laut – Kodiklatal):
  - Naval Operation Education Command (Komando Pendidikan Operasi Laut);
  - Marine Corps Education Command (Komando Pendidikan Marinir);
  - Naval Support Training Command (Komando Pendidikan Dukungan Umum);
  - Basic Military Training and Education Centre (Pusat Latihan dan Pendidikan Dasar Kemiliteran);
  - Electronics and Naval Weapon Guidance System Training Centre (Pusat Latihan Elektronika dan Sistem Kendali Senjata);
  - Naval Operation Training Centre (Pusat Latihan Operasi Laut); and
  - Marine Corps Training Centre (Pusat Latihan Marinir).
4. Indonesian Marine Corps (Korps Marinir Republik Indonesia – Kormar RI), with three Marine Forces and an independent Marine Brigade plus support units.
5. Military Sealift Command (Komando Lintas Laut Militer – Kolinlamil) coordinates the navy's logistical assets in support of its personnel.
  - Military Sealift Force Jakarta
  - Military Sealift Force Surabaya
  - Military Sealift Force Makassar

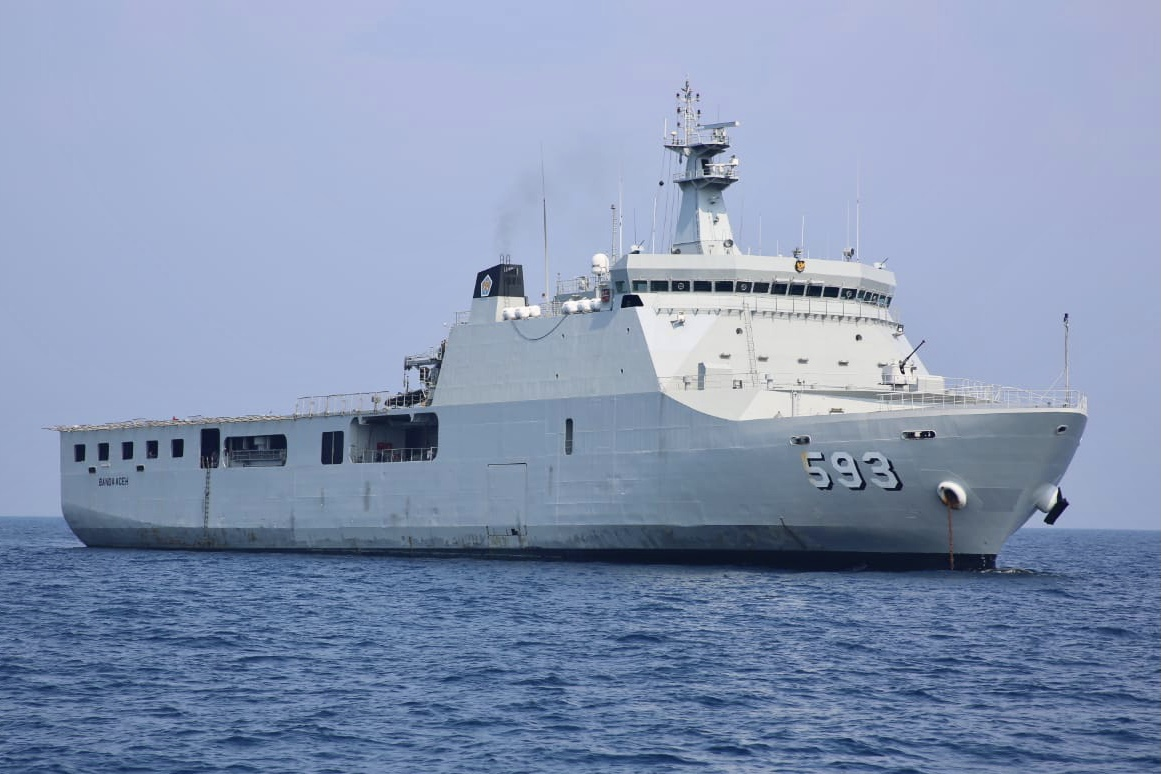
KRI Banda Aceh (593)

=== Naval territorial organization leadership ===
The Navy's territorial organizations are divided into Naval Regional Commands (Komando Daerah Angkatan Laut - Kodaeral), which oversees numerous naval bases and naval maintenance facilities throughout Indonesia.

No.	Naval Region Commands	Headquarters
1.	I Naval Region Command	Medan
2.	II Naval Region Command	Padang
3.	III Naval Region Command	Jakarta
4.	IV Naval Region Command	Batam
5.	V Naval Region Command	Surabaya
6.	VI Naval Region Command	Makassar
7.	VII Naval Region Command	Kupang
8.	VIII Naval Region Command	Manado
9.	IX Naval Region Command	Ambon
10.	X Naval Region Command	Jayapura
11.	XI Naval Region Command	Merauke
12.	XII Naval Region Command	Pontianak
13.	XIII Naval Region Command	Tarakan
14.	XIV Naval Region Command	Sorong

The Naval Region Command HQ organization additionally contains a naval security unit and one naval police/base security battalion.

== Service branches ==
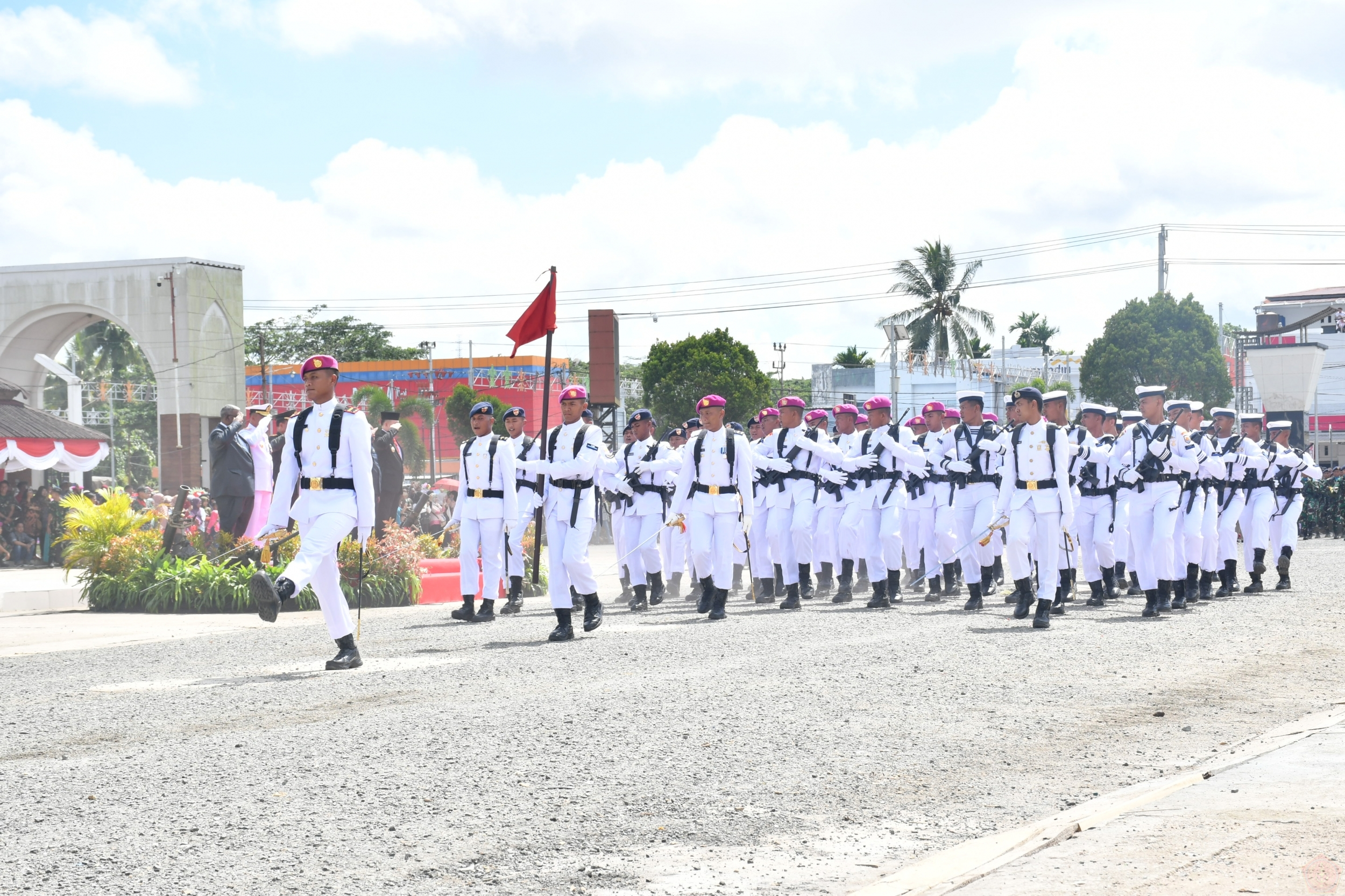
Members of the Indonesian Navy on a parade, the more recent sailor cap style can be seen on the right

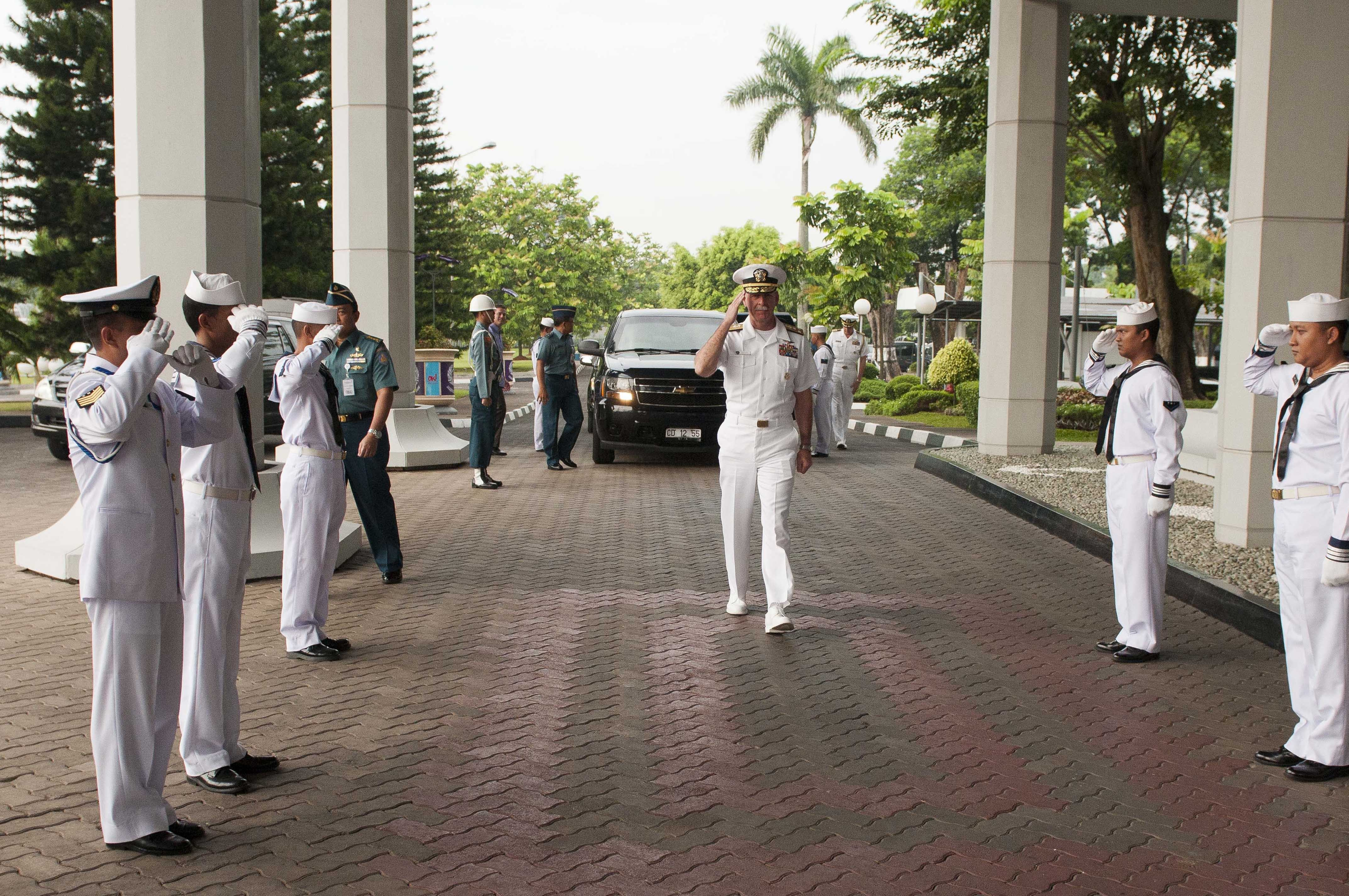
Indonesian Navy enlistees can be seen wearing the old "dixie cup" style sailor cap prior 2021

In general, specialty corps in the navy can be divided into 3 levels according to detail of specialization and rank, which are officers (usually has special title of "Laut" or "Marinir" after their rank), NCOs (specialized corps, including warrant officers) and enlisted (most specialized corps).

All officers regardless of specialty corps wear either peaked caps or specialty coloured berets with their uniforms. Women officers wear crusher caps regardless of their specialty.

Personnel of the Navy deployed as part of Garuda Contingent wears UN Blue beret with UN arms pushed to the right in full dress, combat or service uniform regardless of speciality corps.

- Seaman Corps (Korps Pelaut) (P) – Most wear navy blue berets excepting submariners that wear black berets, enlisted ratings wear sailor caps with their dress uniforms, while senior ranked NCOs wear peaked caps. Since 2021, the US styled "dixie cup" sailor caps were replaced with a more Japanese-European style traditional sailor cap for petty officers and below. The enlisted and NCOs ratings under are further subdivided into the following specialties:
  - Nautical Corps (Bahari) (BAH);
  - Navigation Corps (Navigasi) (NAV);
  - Communication Corps (Komunikasi) (KOM);
  - Surface Weapon Systems (Senjata Atas Air) (SAA);
  - Subsurface Weapon Systems (Senjata Bawah Air) (SBA);
  - Telegraphic Corps (Telegrafis) (TLG);
  - Signal Corps (Isyarat) (ISY);
  - Ammunition Corps (Amunisi) (AMO);
  - Naval Artillery (Meriam) (MER);
  - Naval Missiles (Rudal) (RDL);
  - Naval Mines and Demolitions (Ranjau Laut dan Demolisi) (RJD);
  - Torpedo and Depth Charges (Torpedo dan Bom Laut) (TRB).
- Naval Engineering Corps (Korps Teknik) (T). Officers, NCOs, and enlisted wear construction helmets when performing engineering or transport work. The enlisted and NCOs of electronics corps are further subdivided into the following specialties:
  - Mechanical Engineering (Teknik Mesin) (MES);
  - Diesel Engineering (Teknik Mesin Diesel) (MDL);
  - Civil Engineering (Teknik Bangunan) (THB);
  - Electrical Engineering (Teknik Listrik) (LIS);
  - Aircraft Engineering (Mesin Pesawat Udara) (MPU);
  - Aircraft Electrical Engineering (Listrik Pesawat Udara) (LPU);
  - Motorized Transportation (Angkutan Bermotor) (ANG); and
  - General Construction Engineering (Teknik Konstruksi Umum) (TKU).
- Naval Electronic Corps (Korps Elektronika) (E). The enlisted and NCOs of electronics corps are further subdivided into the following specialties:
  - Electronic Detection (Elektronika Deteksi) (EDE);
  - Electronic Communication (Elektronika Komunikasi) (EKO);
  - Electronic Control (Elektronika Kendali) (EKL);
  - Armaments and Munitions Electronics (Elektronika Senjata dan Amunisi) (ESA);
  - Computer Electronics (Elektronika Teknik Komputer) (ETK); and
  - Armaments Electronics (Elektronika Teknik Senjata) (ETA).
- Supply Corps (Korps Suplai) (S). The enlisted and NCOs of supply corps are further subdivided into the following specialties:
  - Finance (Keuangan) (KEU);
  - Administration (Tata Usaha) (TTU);
  - Housekeeping (Tata Graha) (TTG); and
  - Supply (Perbekalan) (BEK).
- Marine Corps (Korps Marinir) (MAR) – Personnel wear magenta berets. Marine corps personnel use army-style ranks and terminologies, despite being part of the navy. The enlisted and NCOs of marine corps are further subdivided into the following specialties:
  - Infantry (Infanteri) (INF);
  - Amphibious Reconnaissance (Intai Amfibi) (IAM);
  - Artillery (Artileri) (ART);
  - Cavalry (Kavaleri) (KAV);
  - Communications (Komunikasi) (KOM);
  - Combat Engineering (Zeni) (ZNI); and
  - Transport, Logistics and Ordnance (Angkutan dan Peralatan) (ABP).
- Medical Corps (Korps Kesehatan) (K). The enlisted and NCOs of medical corps are further subdivided into the following specialties:
  - General Nursing (Rawat Umum) (RUM);
  - Dental Nursing (Rawat Kesehatan Gigi) (RKG);
  - Pharmacy (Farmasi) (FAR);
  - Medical Corpsman (Asisten Paramedik) (APM);
  - Public Health Assistant (Penunjang Kesehatan) (PNK);
  - Nursing Assistant (Asisten Perawat Kesehatan) (APK);
  - Dental Assistant (Asisten Dokter Gigi) (ADG); and
  - Pharmacy Assistant (Asisten Tenaga Kefarmasian) (ATF).
- Special Corps (Korps Khusus) (KH). The enlisted and NCOs of special corps are further subdivided into the following specialties:
  - Physical Fitness (Jasmani) (JAS);
  - Bandsmen (Musik) (MUS) - bandsmen wear the general uniform of the Operational Corps enlisted ratings and petty officers save for the bands of the Marine Corps that wears magenta berets;
  - Computer Data Processor (Pengelola Data Komputer) (PDK); and
  - Psychology (Psikologi) (PSI).
- Naval Justice Corps (Korps Hukum) (H). Tasked with providing legal service within the Navy on the matters of the Law of the Sea, international law, humanitarian law, human rights law, law enforcement, legal assistance, and legal analysis. Personnel wear similar uniform as Operational Corps.
- Military Police Corps (Korps Polisi Militer) (PM) – Personnel wear light blue berets pushed to the left or blue MP helmet.
- Women's Naval Service Corps (Korps Wanita Angkatan Laut) (W) - Personnel wear variant crusher caps with their uniforms or a naval Tricorne for NCOs, naval policewomen wear the light blue beret or blue helmet. If assigned to Marine Corps, they wear the magenta or purple beret depending on unit assignment.

== Ground forces ==
=== Marine Corps ===
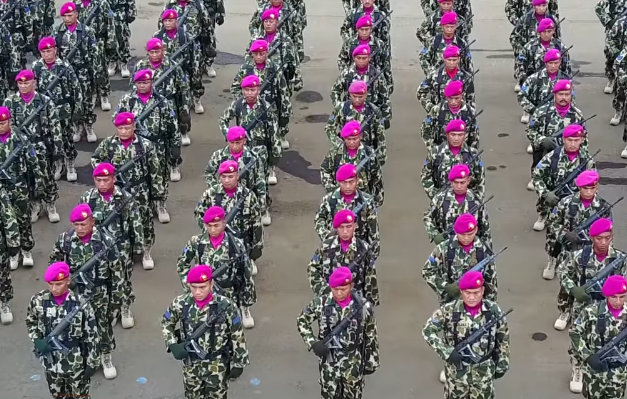
Indonesian Marines

The Indonesian Marine Corps (Indonesian: Korps Marinir Republik Indonesia) officially known as KORMAR RI, "Marinir" or "Korps Marinir" is an integral part of the TNI-AL. It is sized at the military corps level serving as the naval infantry and main amphibious warfare force of the TNI. Distinguished from other TNI-AL members by their unique qualification badges and insignia and unique magenta berets. It is commanded by a 3-star Marine Officer. It has three divisions, which are:

- Pasukan Marinir I (PASMAR I) (Marine Force I) based in Jakarta.
- Pasukan Marinir II (PASMAR II) (Marine Force II) based in Surabaya.
- Pasukan Marinir III (PASMAR III) (Marine Force III) based in Sorong.

The three marine divisions are each led by a 2-star Marine Major General.

=== Special Forces ===
==== Kopaska ====
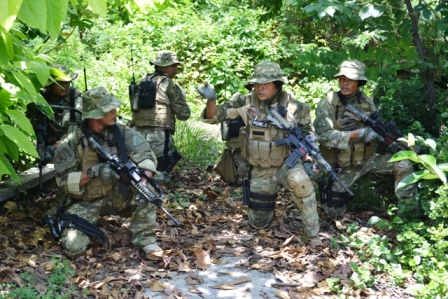
KOPASKA special forces

Formed on 31 March 1962, the Indonesian Navy Frogman Forces Command (Komando Pasukan Katak) or Kopaska is a Frogman unit of the TNI-AL. There are three fleet frogmnan units with detachments specializing in sabotage / anti-sabotage (terror), special operations, combat SAR, EOD and naval minesweeping, underwater demolition and special boat units. KOPASKA's main duties are underwater demolition (raiding enemy ships and bases), destroying main underwater installations, reconnaissance, prisoner snatches, preparing beaches for larger naval amphibious operations, and counter-terrorism. In peacetime the unit deploys a seven-person team to serve as security personnel for VIPs. They wear the maroon beret.

==== Yontaifib ====
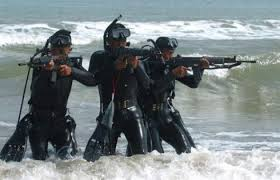
Taifib personnel during training exercise

The Marine amphibious reconnaissance battalions (Batalyon Intai Amfibi) or Yontaifib is an elite recon unit within the Indonesian Marine Corps which is tasked for conducting Amphibious reconnaissance and Special reconnaissance. Taifib was previously known as "Kipam" (abbreviation from: "Komando Intai Para Amfibi") which literally means in English: the Para-Amphibious reconnaissance Commandos.

They were officially formed on 13 March 1961 as marine commandos in response to Operation Trikora. Set at a brigade strength of three regiments, "Taifib" was formed as the elite amphibious reconnaissance unit of the Marine Corps, and as a unit of that formation wears magenta berets.

==== Denjaka ====
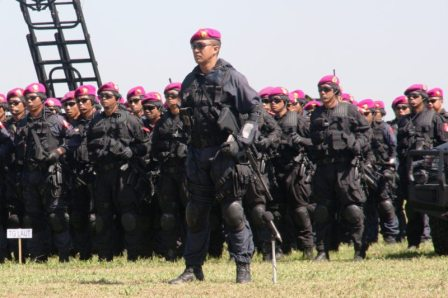
Jala Mangkara Detachment personnel

Jala Mangkara Detachment (Detasemen Jala Mangkara) or Denjaka is the special operations and counter-terrorism forces of the Indonesian Navy. This is a combined detachment formed from selected personnel of the Navy's Underwater Special Unit (Kopaska) and the Marine Corps' Amphibious Reconnaissance Regiments (Taifib). The unit was formed in 1984 by the Commander of the Indonesian National Armed Forces to counter maritime strategic threats including terrorism and sabotage. Despite the specific reason for its formation, as in the case of any other special operations forces around the world, the detachment is also fully trained in conducting reconnaissance, unconventional warfare, and clandestine behind-enemy-lines operations. Denjaka's primary task is to develop anti-terrorism, anti-sabotage and other clandestine operations capabilities in support of maritime counter-terrorism, counter-sabotage and other special operations as directed by the commander of the armed forces. Denjaka personnel wear the purple beret.

== Equipment ==
Commissioned ships of TNI-AL are classified under one of two prefixes; KRI, standing for Kapal Republik Indonesia (Ship of the Republic of Indonesia) and KAL, standing for Kapal Angkatan Laut (Navy Ship). The prefix KAL is used for smaller boats which have a length less than 36m, and made from fibreglass.

== Ongoing projects ==
The Indonesian Navy is progressing the Minimum Essential Force plan to replenish and modernise the fleet, this includes achieving 151 vessels (minimum), 220 vessels (standard), or 274 vessels (ideal), for which it has a blueprint out to 2024. Some of those platforms yet to be delivered include:

- Scorpène class attack submarine, on 2 April 2024, Naval Group announced that the Indonesian Navy has placed an order for two improved Scorpène-class submarine, which will be built by PT PAL in Indonesia. The contract has entered into force on 23 July 2025.
- Indigenous Autonomous Submarines, / Kapal Selam Otonom (KSOT). Currently 8 prototypes have been developed by PT PAL, and it is expected to be operate in 2026. The submarines come in three different configurations, surveillance, torpedo carrying variants or kamikaze. It is unclear how many and of which type the Navy will use.
- Balaputradewa class frigate, variant of Type 31 frigate design and built by PT PAL.
  - Lead ship under construction. First steel cut on 9 December 2022. Keel laid on 25 August 2023.
  - Second ship under construction. First steel cut on 5 June 2024.
- Thaon di Revel class offshore patrol vessel, in March 2024, Fincantieri and the Indonesian Ministry of Defence have signed a 1.18-billion-euro contract for the supply of two Thaon di Revel-class offshore patrol vessel. The ships to be sold would be among those that already being built for the Italian Navy in order to accelerate delivery.
- İstif class frigate, built by TAIS Shipyards. Indonesian Navy ordered two frigates on 26 July 2025.
- Raja Haji Fisabilillah class offshore patrol vessel, designated as Offshore Patrol Vessel 90M and built by PT. Daya Radar Utama.
  - Lead ship fitting out. Keel laid on 16 November 2022. Launched on 18 September 2024.
  - Second ship fitting out. Keel laid on 16 November 2022. Launched on 20 September 2024.
- Dorang class patrol boat, designated as Patroli Cepat 60M (Fast Patrol 60M) built by multiple local shipyard.
  - Fifth and sixth ship under construction by PT. Caputra Mitra Sejati shipyard.
- KCR-60M Tesco fast missile boat, Sampari class variant with water-jet propulsion and built by PT. Tesco Indomaritim since 2021.
  - Lead ship fitting out. Launched on 3 November 2022
  - Second and third ship under construction.
- KCR-60M Palindo fast missile boat, another Sampari class variant with waterjet propulsion and built by PT. Palindo Marine.
  - Lead ship under construction. The keel laid on 12 June 2024.
- BHO-105M hydrographic-oceanographic research vessel, built by PT. Palindo Marine in collaboration with Abeking & Rasmussen.
  - Lead ship fitting out. First steel cut on 15 September 2023. Keel laid on 14 December 2023. Launched on 24 September 2024.
- SRS Mothership, 1 unit on order, to be built by BTI Defence.

== Integrated Maritime Surveillance Systems ==
With various coastal radars, Indonesia has one of the world's longest Integrated Maritime Surveillance Systems (IMSS). The network covers more than 1,205 kilometres (749 mi) of coastline in the Straits of Malacca and about 1,285 kilometres (798 mi) of coastline in the Sulawesi Sea.

The IMSS is a tightly integrated network of ship and shore based sensors, communications devices, and computing resources that collect, transmit, analyse and display a broad array of maritime data including Automatic Identification System (AIS), surface radar, surveillance cameras, Global Positioning System (GPS), equipment health monitors and radio transmissions of maritime traffic in wide operating areas. Redundant sensors and multiple communication paths make the IMSS a robust and capable system. The IMSS enhances Indonesia's ability to detect, track, and monitor vessels passing through territorial and international waters. This capability is crucial to combating piracy, illegal fishing, smuggling, and terrorism within and around Indonesia's maritime borders. The IMSS is operated by the Indonesian Navy, and consists of 18 Coastal Surveillance Stations (CSS), 11 Ship-based Radars, two Regional Command Centers, and two Fleet Command Centers (Jakarta and Surabaya).

== Rank structure ==
Command and Staff rank
An example of a Second lieutenant rank (left) with red band indicating a command rank. While (right) without red band indicating a staff rank.

In the Navy, as well as in other armed forces branches in Indonesia, the rank consists of officer in Indonesian known as "Perwira", NCO "Bintara" and enlisted "Tamtama".

The Indonesian Navy is one of few navies in the world which use rank titles similar to its Army, except for flag officers and lower-ranking enlisted sailors. However the Indonesian Marine Corps, which is a branch of the Navy, uses exactly the same rank titles as those of the Army, but still uses Navy-style insignia (for lower-ranking enlisted marines, blue replaces the red colour). Starting 2006, navy personnel assigned abroad are authorized to use foreign service uniform, officially named "Black Navy" (similar to service dress blues in United States Navy) during their service overseas (e.g. during training exercises), which includes sleeve and cuff insignia.

The proper title to address rank are as follows, all high-ranking officers (Admiral or Marine General) use their rank followed by "(TNI)", while other officers use their rank followed by respective branch/corps. For example, a Navy captain from fleet forces corps uses the title "Kolonel Laut Pelaut" (written as "Kolonel Laut (P)"), while a Navy Vice Admiral uses the title "Laksamana Madya (TNI)" regardless of their previous branches. Warrant officers, NCOs and enlisted seamen may put their respective branch/corps specialty, for example: "Pembantu Letnan Dua SAA" (warrant officer from surface weaponry corps) and "Kelasi Dua TRB" (seaman recruit from torpedo corps). All marine corps personnel, general officers inclusive, use their rank followed by "(Mar)".

Note: The red banding on the rank insignia denotes the personnel holding a command position which is agnostic of rank.

=== Officers ===
Rank group	General/flag officers					Senior officers			Junior officers
Indonesian Navy
Indonesian Navy	Laksamana besar	Laksamana	Laksamana madya	Laksamana muda	Laksamana pertama	Kolonel	Letnan kolonel	Mayor	Kapten	Letnan satu	Letnan dua
Sleeve	No insignia

=== Enlisted ratings ===
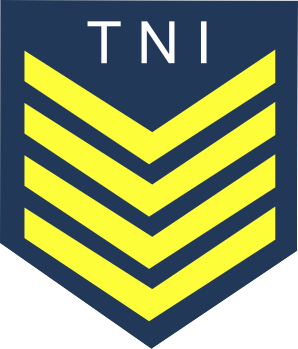
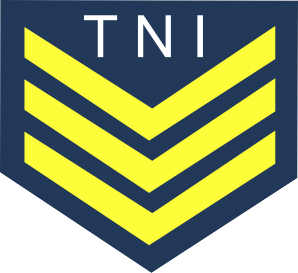
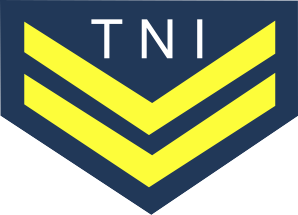
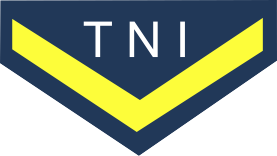
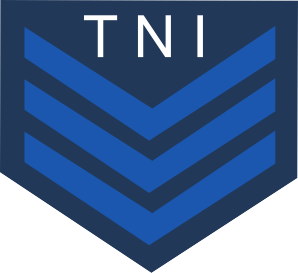
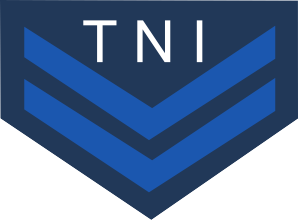
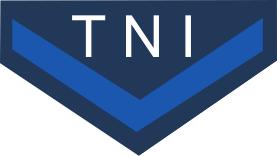
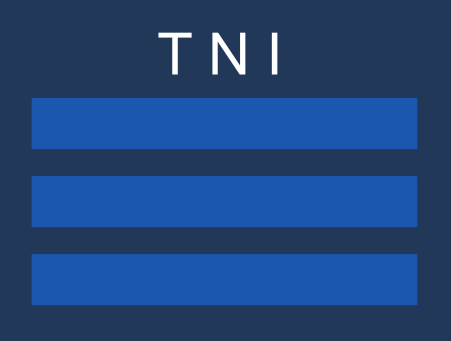
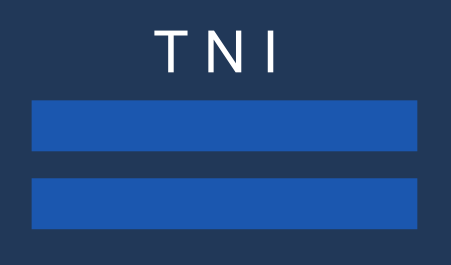
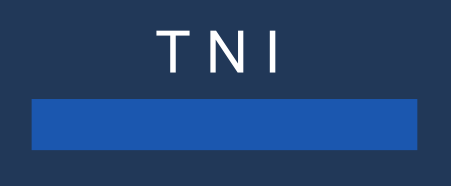
Rank group	Senior NCOs						Junior NCOs			Enlisted
Indonesian Navy
Indonesian Navy	Pembantu letnan satu	Pembantu letnan dua	Sersan mayor	Sersan kepala	Sersan satu	Sersan dua	Kopral kepala	Kopral satu	Kopral dua	Kelasi kepala	Kelasi satu	Kelasi dua

== See also ==
- Indonesian Naval Academy
- Indonesian Maritime Security Agency
- List of former ships of the Indonesian Navy
- Indonesian military ranks
- Indonesian Army
- Indonesian Air Force
