= List of Royal Brunei Navy ships =

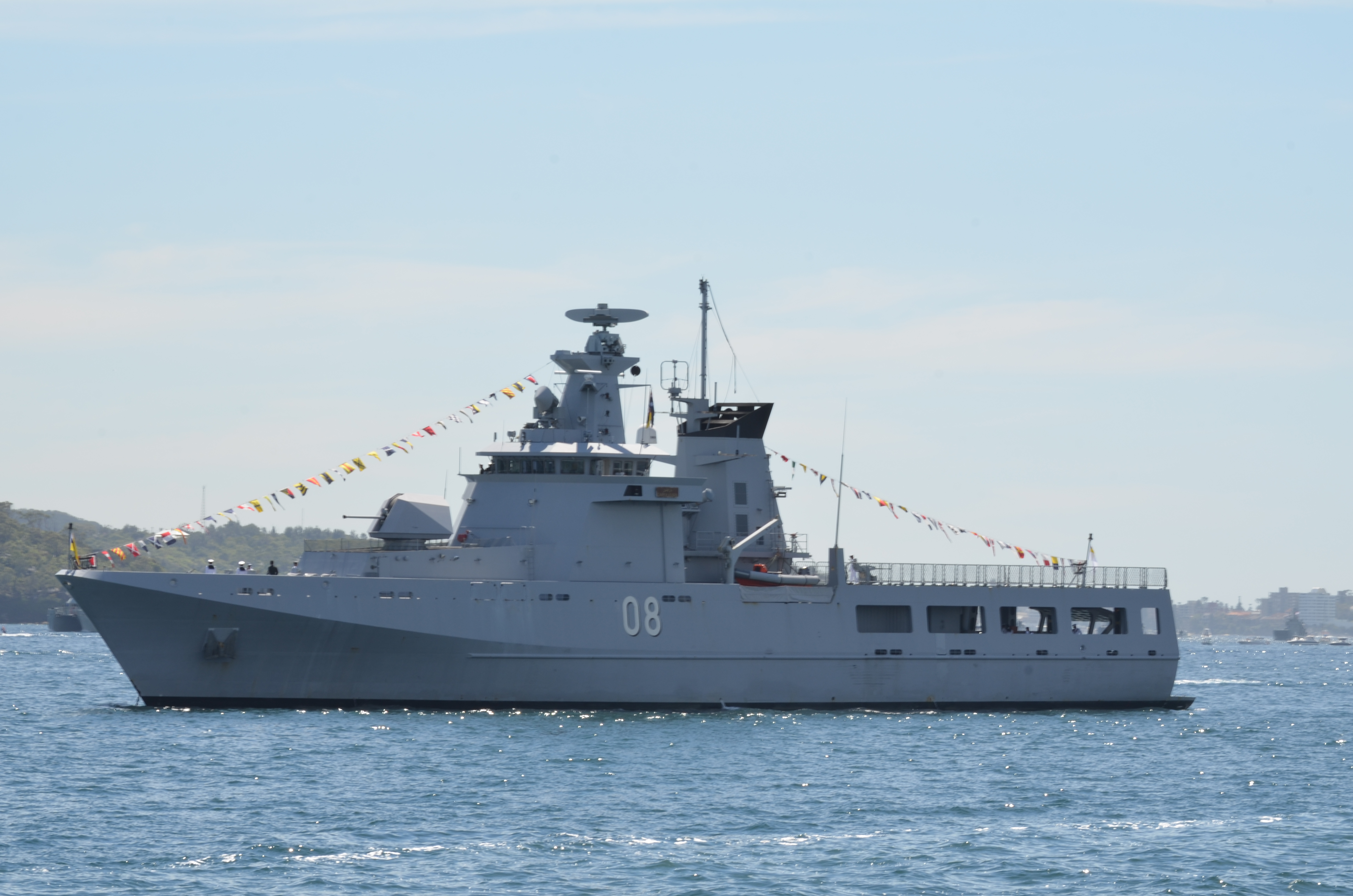
KDB Darulaman (08), an offshore patrol vessel of the Royal Brunei Navy at anchor at Port Jackson, during the Royal Australian Navy (RAN) International Fleet Review 2013

This list of Royal Brunei Navy ships includes all ships and associated aquatic vessels; current and former of Brunei Darussalam, grouped by their various classes, that belong to, operated by, and commissioned into service in the Royal Brunei Navy (RBN), since its formation on 14 June 1965, when it was initially known as the Boat Section of the Royal Brunei Armed Forces (RBAF).

== Current RBN fleet ==
The current fleet of the Royal Brunei Navy (RBN) consists of the following types and classes of ships. All are surface vessels, the RBN does not operate any submarines or submersibles.

=== Surface combatants ===
==== Patrol vessels ====
===== Darussalam class offshore patrol vessel =====
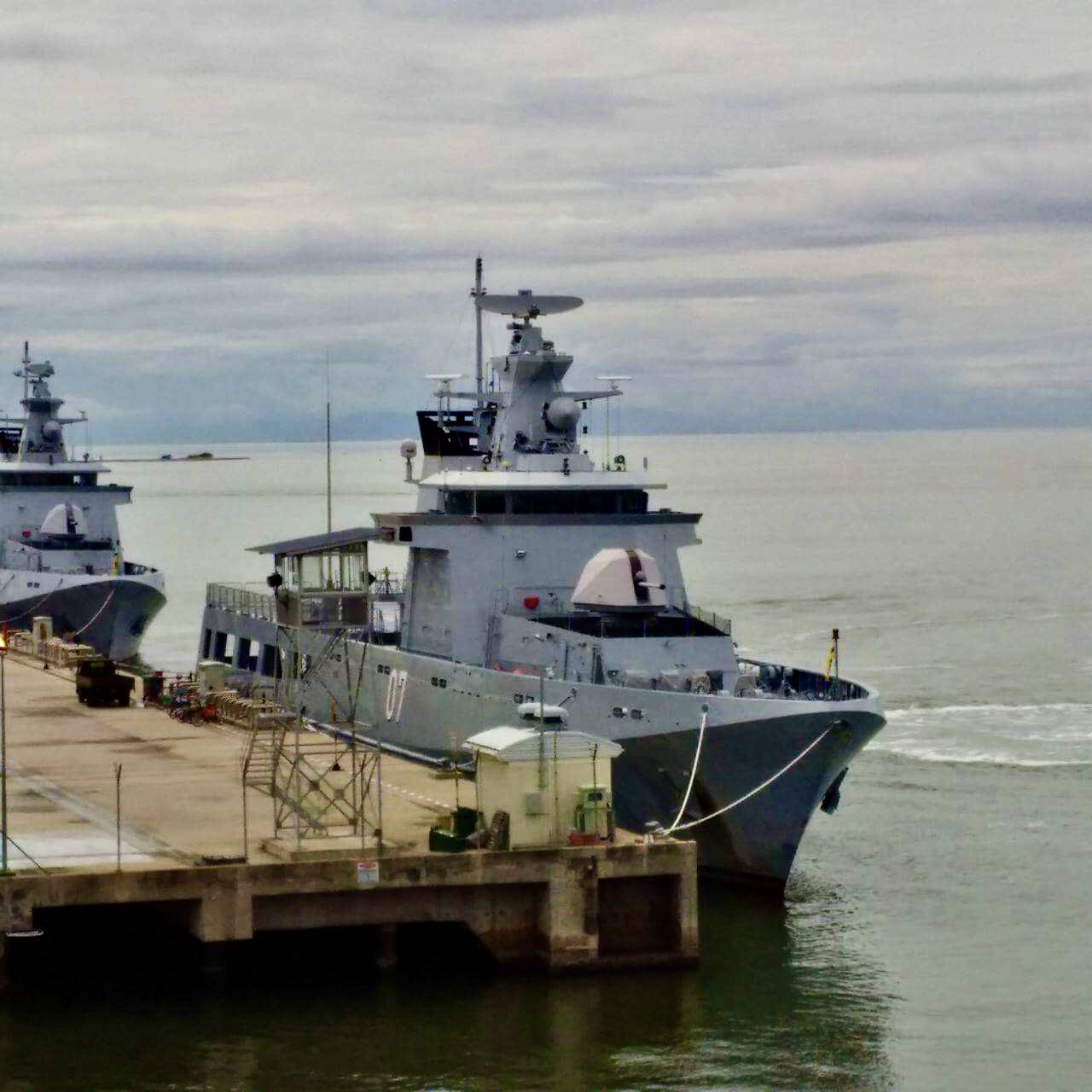
KDB Darulehsan (07) moored alongside at Muara Naval Base in 2016.

The Darussalam class is a class of four offshore patrol vessels constructed for the RBN, and commissioned starting in 2011. At 80 metres (262 feet) length with a displacement of 1,625 tonnes (1,791 short tons; 1,599 long tons), they are the largest and most capable ships of the RBN, and often participate in international naval exercises.

pennant no.	name	MMSI	call sign	builder	launched	commissioned
06	KDB Darussalam	508111122	V8DE	Lurssen Werft, Bremen-Vegesack	12 Nov 2010	7 May 2011
07	KDB Darulehsan	508111123	V8DF	Lurssen Werft, Bremen-Vegesack	12 Nov 2010	7 May 2011
08	KDB Darulaman	508111124	V8DG	Lurssen Werft, Bremen-Vegesack		12 Aug 2011
09	KDB Daruttaqwa	508211110	V8DL	Lurssen Werft, Bremen-Vegesack		8 Sep 2014

===== Ijtihad class patrol boat =====
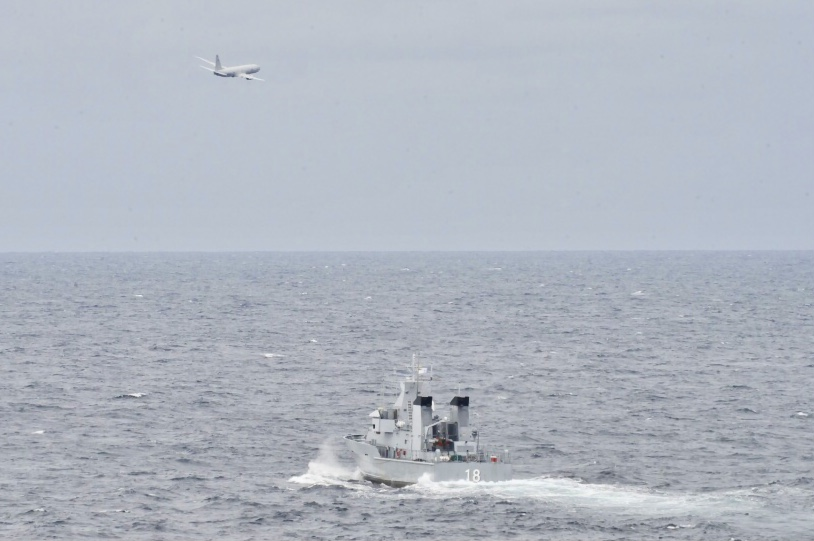
KDB Berkat (18) underway during CARAT 2018

The Ijtihad class consists of four fast patrol boats built by Lürssen Werft, Germany. They were delivered to Brunei in 2009, and commissioned into the RBN in 2010. At 41 metres (135 feet) length with a displacement of 262 tonnes (289 short tons; 258 long tons), they patrol the coast of Brunei, and sometimes participate in joint naval exercises.

pennant no.	name	MMSI	call sign	builder	launched	commissioned
17	KDB Ijtihad	508111118	V8DA	Lurssen Werft, Bremen-Vegesack	2009	March 2010
18	KDB Berkat	508111119	V8DB	Lurssen Werft, Bremen-Vegesack	2009	March 2010
19	KDB Syafaat	508111120	V8DC	Lurssen Werft, Bremen-Vegesack	2009	August 2010
20	KDB Afiat	508111121	V8DD	Lurssen Werft, Bremen-Vegesack	2009	August 2010

===== As-Siddiq class patrol vessel =====
In the Republic of Singapore Navy (RSN), the Fearless class replaced their earlier Swift-class patrol craft after the Swifts were transferred to the Police Coast Guard of Singapore. ST Marine was given the contract to build the Fearless class ships for Singapore on 27 February 1993. From early 2017, the RSN started to decommission their Fearless class vessels (one was stricken in May 2003 following damage caused by a collision with a container), though four vessels were subsequently modified as Sentinel-class maritime security and response vessels and remain in service with the RSN.

The two RBN As-Siddiq class vessels; RSS Brave (95), decommissioned on 27 August 2019, and RSS Gallant (97), decommissioned on 11 December 2020, were refurbished and given as a present to the Royal Brunei Navy in March 2023. They are now known in RBN service as KDB As-Siddiq (meaning 'truthful') and KDB Al-Faruq. They have a length of 55 metres (180 feet), with a displacement of 500 tonnes (551 short tons; 492 long tons).

pennant no.	name	launched (RSN)	commissioned (RSN)	commissioned (RBN)	notes
–	KDB As-Siddiq	9 September 1995	5 October 1996	21 March 2023	previously in service with the Republic of Singapore Navy as RSS Brave (95) until its decommissioning on 27 August 2019
–	KDB Al-Faruq	27 April 1996	3 May 1997	13 December 2023	previously in service with the Republic of Singapore Navy as RSS Gallant (97) until its decommissioning on 11 December 2020

==== Fast attack craft ====
===== Waspada class fast attack craft =====
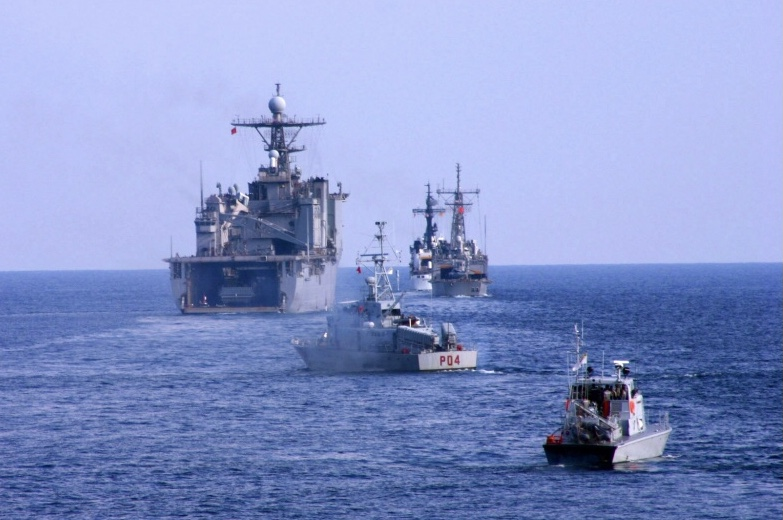
KDB Seteria (P04) underway during CARAT 2008

The Waspada class is a class of fast attack crafts that was built for the RBN by Vosper Thornycroft in England in the late 1970s. Three vessels were built; one remains in service, while two were donated to the Indonesian Navy as patrol craft.

- (P04) KDB Seteria

===== KDB Mustaed =====
The fast interceptor boat, KDB Mustaed (21), is the only one of its kind in the RBN; it is in active service.

- (21) KDB Mustaed

=== Amphibious ships ===
==== Landing craft ====
Four landing craft vessels in two classes are operated by the RBN Support Squadron. Their purpose is to support other units from all branches of the Royal Brunei Armed Forces (RBAF); they are primarily tasked with the movement of light and heavy vehicles and personnel of the Royal Brunei Land Force (RBLF) through the rivers of Brunei. There are two classes of landing craft:

===== Damuan class =====
The Damuan class are a class of two vessels of the RBN Support Squadron.

pennant no.	name	builder	launched	commissioned	status
31	KDB Damuan	Cheverton Workboats, Cowes, England	1976	1976	decommissioned
32	KDB Puni	Cheverton Workboats, Cowes, England	1977	1977	commissioned as in-port scuba diver tender

===== Serasa class =====
The Serasa class are a class of two vessels operated by the RBN Support Squadron. They have a length of 36.5 metres (120 feet), with a displacement of 220 to 370 tonnes (243 to 408 short tons; 217 to 364 long tons).

pennant no.	name	IMO number	builder	launched	commissioned
33	KDB Serasa	9143659	Transfield Shipbuilding, Henderson, Western Australia	Aug 1996	7 May 1997
34	KDB Teraban	9143661	Transfield Shipbuilding, Henderson, Western Australia	Aug 1996	7 May 1997

=== Auxiliary ships ===
==== Launch boat ====
Used as tugboat and dive tender.

- Burong Nuri

==== Miscellaneous vessels ====
- KDB Bakti

== Decommissioned RBN vessels ==
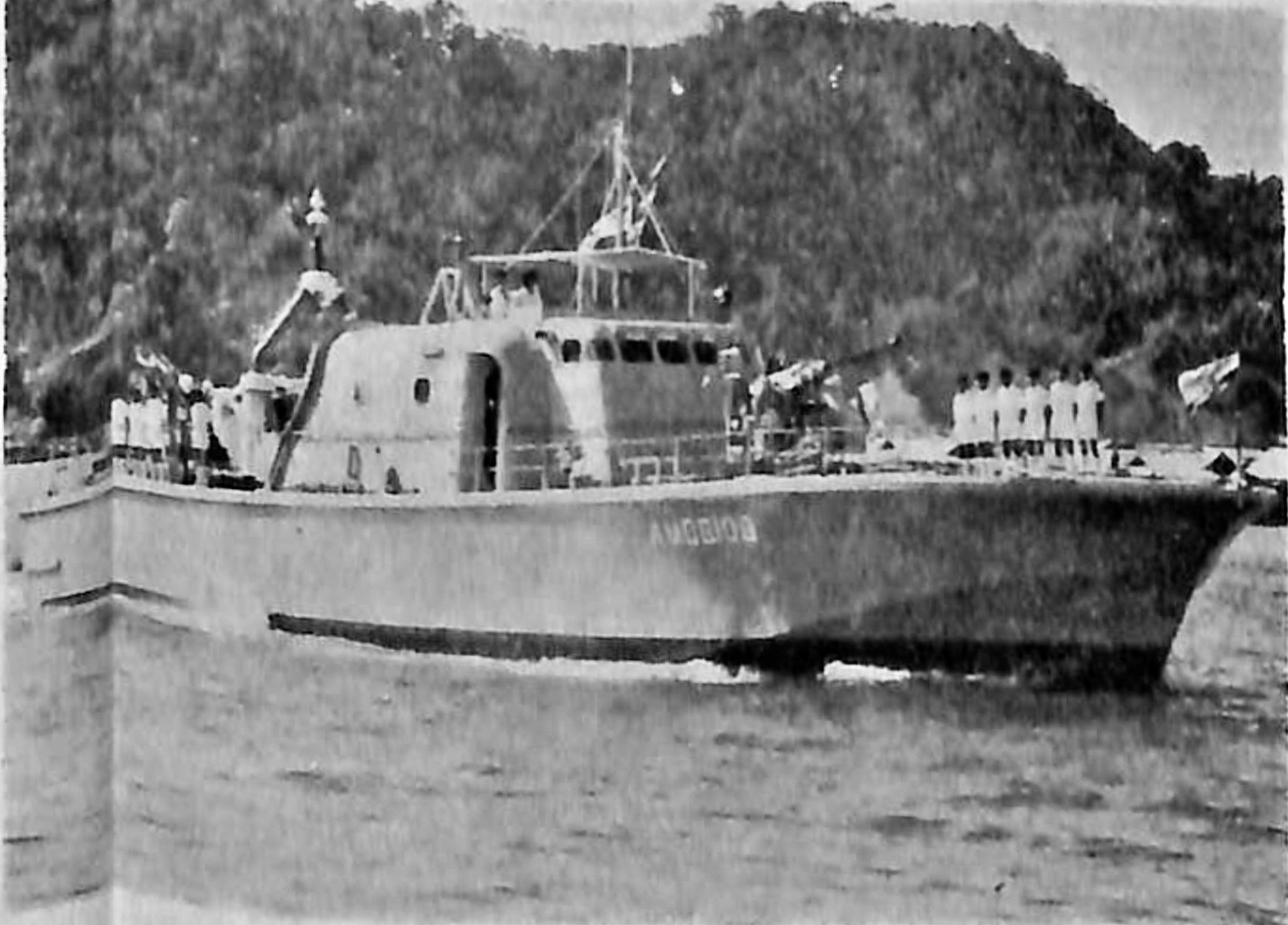
KDB Pahlawan (P01) on patrol in 1969

The following types and classes were previously commissioned into the fleet of the RBN; but are now decommissioned. The RBN was originally known as Boat Section of the Royal Brunei Armed Forces in 1965, this unit was subsequently renamed Boat Company in 1966. In 1971, the Boat Company was then reorganised as Angkatan Laut Pertama, Askar Melayu DiRaja Brunei (ALP AMDB), or the First Sea Battalion, Royal Brunei Malay Regiment (FSB RBMR). On 1 October 1991, it became a fully independent service branch, becoming the RBN.

=== Fast attack craft ===
RBN / TLDB class	prefix & name, pennant no.	notes
Pahlawan class	KDB Pahlawan (P01)	first ship of the Boat Section of the RBAF, the forerunner of the Royal Brunei Navy, commissioned in 1968, becoming flagship for the unit, originally identified as AMDB 100
Waspada class	KDB Waspada (P02); KDB Pejuang (P03)	both were donated to Indonesian Navy

=== Hovercraft ===
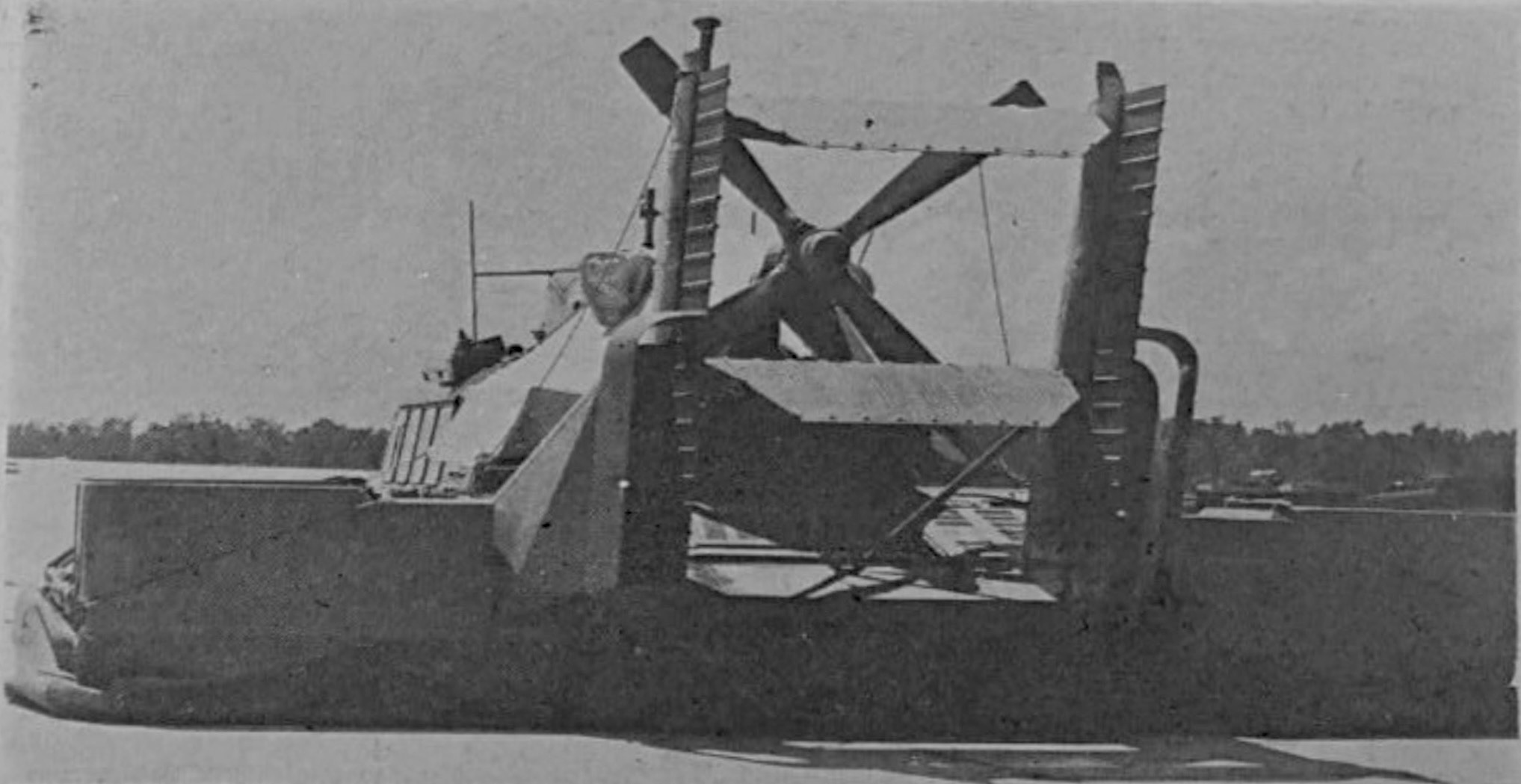
A SR.N5 hovercraft of the Boat Company, Royal Brunei Malay Regiment in 1967

In 1966, several hovercraft of type SR.N5 were acquired and put into service, and SR.N6 were acquired in 1968. The two crafts were used to maintain national security and provide transportation across rivers. The medium-sised hovercraft was utilised not only to protect the national security of the State of Brunei but also for search and rescue missions and to get access to difficult-to-reach areas like the Temburong District.

==== Warden class ====
The RBMR was the first to use the Westland Saunders Roe SR.N5 (also known as the Warden class) in 1966 as part of its military expansion. The first craft costs around B$650,000 and has a maximum speed of 72 miles per hour (116 km/h), was ordered from World Wide Helicopters. SR.N5 could accommodate fifteen soldiers along with a pilot. It was capable of traveling up to 240 nanometres (9.4×10^{−6} in) at its maximum speed of 42 knots (78 km/h; 48 mph).

All Warden class hovercraft built by the British Hovercraft Corporation for the RBN are now decommissioned.

- SR.N5
- SR.N6

=== Patrol vessels ===
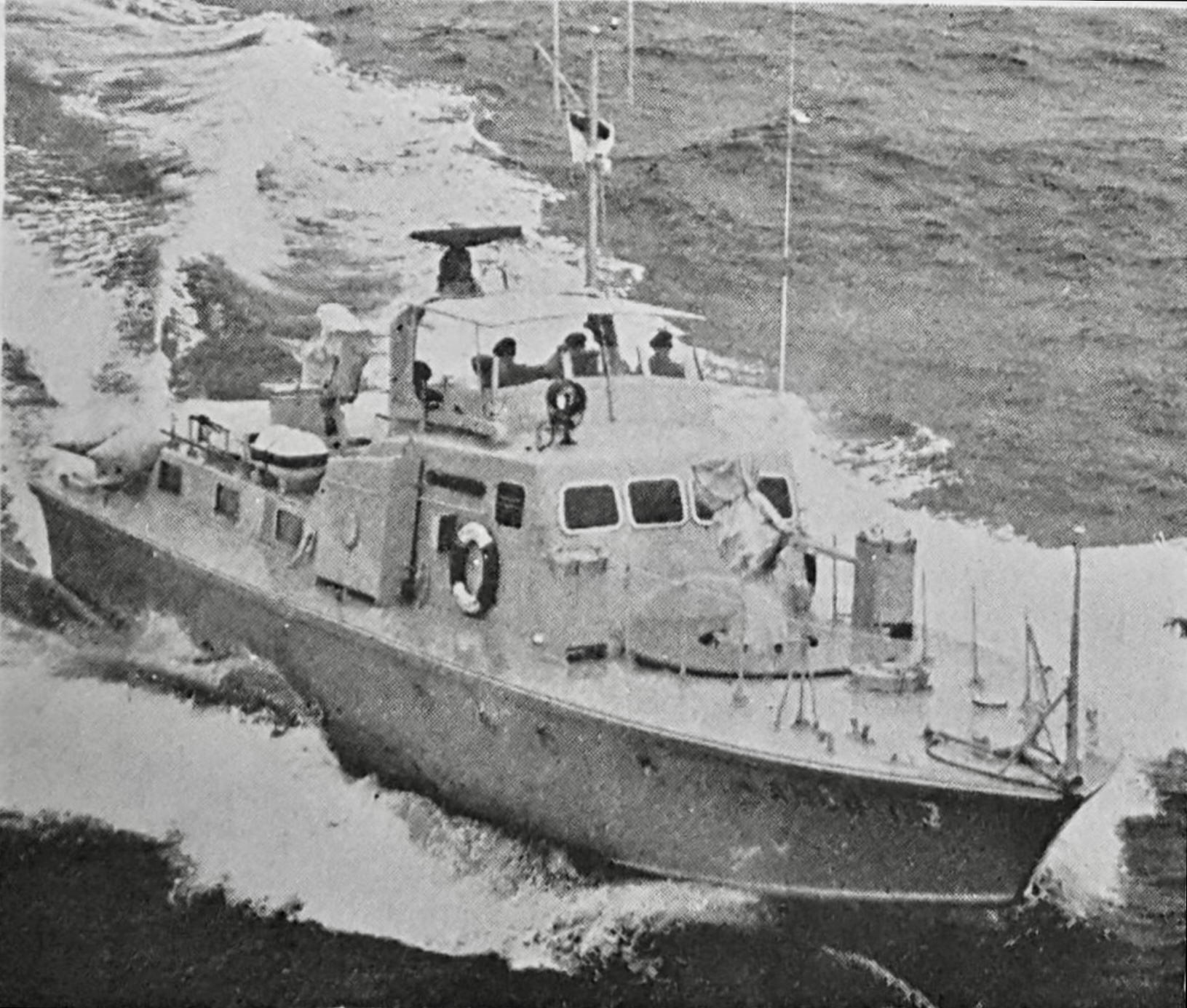
KD Saleha (P11) underway in 1971

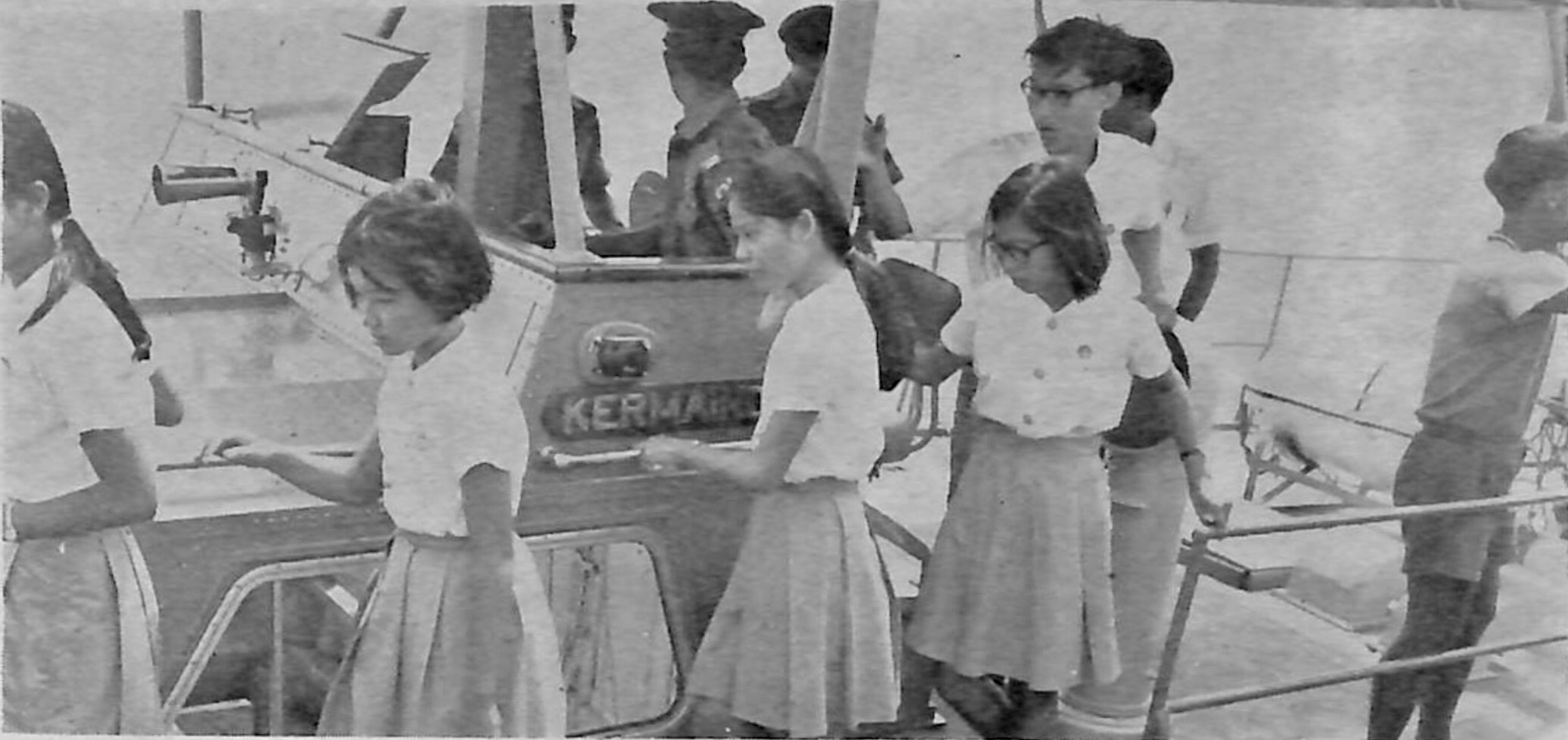
Pupils from St. John's School visit KDB Kermaindera (P23) in 1969

RBN class	prefix & name (pennant no.)	notes, ref.
Saleha class	KD Saleha (P11); KD Masna (P12); KD Nor'ain (P13)	coastal patrol craft (CPC) built by Vosper Thornycroft in England, originally identified as AMDB 111, AMDB 112, and AMDB 113, the first two were commissioned in 1971
Perwira class	KDB Perwira (P14); KDB Pemburu (P15); KDB Penyerang (P16)	built by Vosper Thornycroft in Singapore, all three coastal patrol craft (CPC) were decommissioned 2016-2017
Bendahara class	KDB Bendahara (P21); KDB Maharajalela (P22); KDB Kermaindera (P23)	ordered from Singapore in 1965, three riverine patrol boats were delivered in 1966. Throughout their service, the boats underwent changes to accommodate the evolving requirements of the government. The boats were used to patrol coastline, as well as its intricate system of interior canals and rivers. The boats served for more than fourteen years before being decommissioned in 1980. P22 is preserved on static display outside the Royal Brunei Armed Forces Museum as a museum ship
Bahagia class	KDB Bahagia (S24); KDB Selamat (S26)	

== See also ==
- List of equipment of the Royal Brunei Land Forces
- List of equipment of the Royal Brunei Air Force
