= KDB Syafaat =

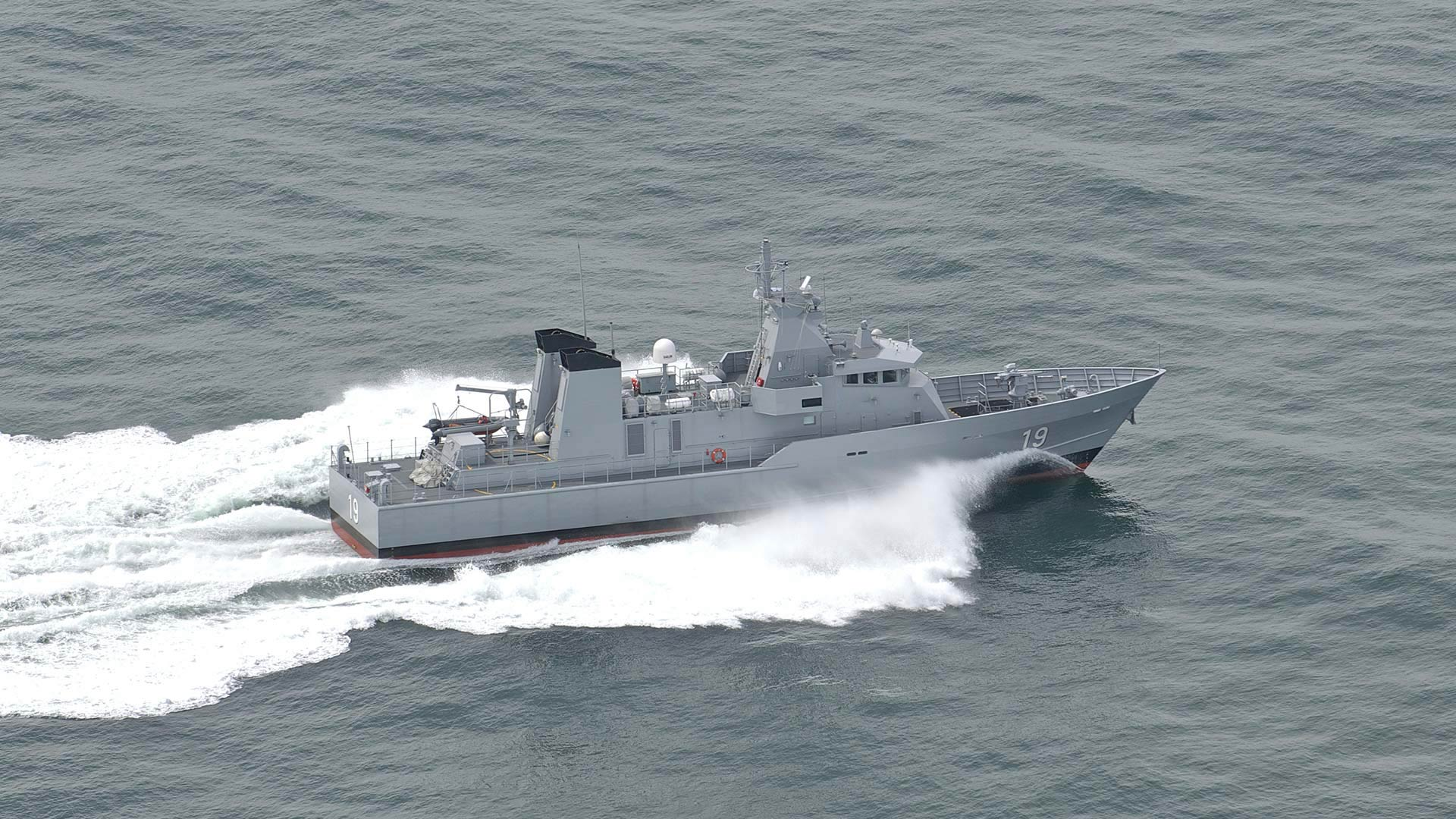
- KDB Syafaat during sea trails

History

Brunei
- Name: Syafaat (Intercession)
- Namesake: Syafaat
- Builder: Lürssen Werft
- Launched: 2009
- Acquired: 27 August 2010
- Commissioned: 28 August 2010
- Home port: Muara, Brunei
- Identification: 19
- Status: Active

General characteristics
- Class & type: Itjihad-class patrol boat
- Type: FPB 41 fast patrol boat
- Displacement: 262 tons
- Length: 41 m (134 ft 6 in)
- Beam: 7.7 m (25 ft 3 in)
- Draught: 1.9 m (6 ft 3 in)
- Installed power: 6,670 kW (8,940 hp)
- Propulsion: 2x diesel engines; 2x propellers
- Speed: 30 knots (56 km/h; 35 mph) maximum
- Complement: 16 (+5 embarked)
- Sensors & processing systems: 1 x navigation radar 1x MEOS ESM
- Armament: 1× Rheinmetall MLG 27 mm gun

KDB Syafaat (19) is the third ship of the Itjihad-class patrol boats. The vessel is in active service in the Royal Brunei Navy (RBN).

== Development ==
=== Background ===
A total of four Ijtihad-class fast patrol boats have been commissioned into service with the Royal Brunei Navy (RBN), where two of the ships began operating since March 2010 followed by another two on 28 August 2010.

Two Ijtihad-class fast patrol boats arrived in Brunei Darussalam on 27 August 2010. The boats, given the prefix Kapal Diraja Brunei (KDB) Syafaat and Afiat were commissioned at the RBN Base in Muara, Brunei. They are part of the project between the government of Brunei Darussalam and Lürssen Werft.

The commissioning ceremony of both vessels was officiated by Major General Dato Paduka Seri Haji Aminuddin Ihsan bin Pehin Orang Kaya Saiful Mulok Dato Seri Paduka Haji Abidin, Commander of the Royal Brunei Armed Forces (RBAF). Like previous fast patrol boats, Syafaat and Afiat were produced in Germany and completed sea trials. Sister ships Ijtihad and Berkat began operations on 15 March 2010.

== Construction and career ==
Syafaat was built by Lürssen Werft company in Germany around 2009. She is part of the second batch delivered from Germany to Brunei. Syafaat and Afiat commissioned together on 27 August 2010 at Muara Naval Base. All three of her sister ships work in the patrol craft role.

Syafaat is commanded by Commander Mohammad Zouhdy bin Haji Abdul Razak.

=== Exercise Pelican 2011 ===
The Royal Brunei Navy and Republic of Singapore Navy held Exercise Pelican from 10 to 13 July 2011 which consisted of Syafaat, Ijtihad and RSS Stalwart.

=== Exercise HELANG LAUT 13/12 ===
Syafaat, Afiat, KRI Barakuda and KRI Lemadang participated in the exercise which is held by the Royal Brunei Navy and Royal Malaysian Navy from 19 to 23 March 2012.

=== Exercise Penguin 2015 ===
Exercise Penguin was held jointly by the Royal Brunei Navy and Royal Australian Navy. The exercise consisted of ships HMAS Armidale, Syafaat and Daruttaqwa.

An exercise was held from 21 to 28 January 2016 by the Royal Brunei Navy which consisted of Syafaat and Darulehsan.

=== CARAT 2019 ===
Syafaat, Darulaman, and the American USNS Millinocket and USS Montgomery conducted "Cooperation Afloat Readiness and Training" (CARAT) to strengthen the relations between Brunei Darussalam and the United States. It took place in the South China Sea on 29 October 2019.
