= KDB Ijtihad =

Ijtihad-class patrol boat lead ship

History

Brunei Darussalam
- Name: Ijtihad (Effort)
- Namesake: Ijtihad
- Operator: Royal Brunei Navy
- Builder: Lürssen Werft
- Launched: 2009
- Commissioned: 15 March 2010
- Home port: Muara Naval Base
- Identification: pennant number: 17
- Status: active

General characteristics
- Class & type: Ijtihad-class patrol boat
- Displacement: 262 tonnes (258 long tons; 289 short tons)
- Length: 41 metres (134 ft 6 in)
- Beam: 7.7 metres (25 ft 3 in)
- Draught: 1.9 metres (6 ft 3 in)
- Installed power: 2x diesel engines, 6,670 kW (8,940 hp)
- Propulsion: 2x propellers
- Speed: 30 knots (56 km/h; 35 mph) maximum
- Complement: 16 (+5 embarked)
- Sensors & processing systems: 1x navigation radar; 1x MEOS ESM
- Armament: 1× Rheinmetall MLG 27 mm gun

KDB Ijtihad (17) is the lead ship of the Ijtihad-class patrol boats. The vessel is in active service in the Royal Brunei Navy (RBN).

== Development ==
=== Background ===
A total of four Ijtihad-class fast patrol boats have been commissioned into service in Brunei Darussalam with the Royal Brunei Navy (RBN), where two of the ships began operating since March 2010, followed by another two on 28 August 2010.

Two Ijtihad-class fast patrol boats arrived in Brunei Darussalam on 27 August 2010. The boats were given the prefix Malay: Kapal Diraja Brunei (KDB), and named Syafaat and Afiat, were commissioned by the RBN at Muara Naval Base. They are part of the project between the Brunei Darussalam government and Lürssen Werft.

The commissioning ceremony of both vessels was officiated by Major General Aminuddin Ihsan, the then Commander of the Royal Brunei Armed Forces (RBAF). Like previous fast patrol boats, Syafaat and Afiat were produced in Germany and completed sea trials. Ijtihad and Berkat began operations on 15 March 2010.

== Construction and career ==
Ijtihad was built by Lürssen Werft company in Germany around 2009. She is part of the first batch of two vessels delivered from Germany to Brunei Darussalam. Ijtihad and Berkat commissioned together on 15 March 2010 at Muara Naval Base. All four of her sister ships work in the patrol craft role.

=== Exercise Hornbill 21/2011 ===
The Royal Malaysian Navy and Royal Brunei Navy concluded the military exercise Exercise Hornbill from 19 to 23 December 2011, which consisted of Afiat, Ijtihad, KD Kedah and KD Ganas.

=== Exercise Hornbill 22/2012 ===
Ijtihad, KDB Darussalam, KD Lekir, KD Laksamana Tan Pusmah, and KD Kasturi attended Exercise Hornbill 22/2012 from 3 to 8 December 2012, hosted by both the Royal Brunei Navy and Royal Malaysian Navy.

=== Exercise Hornbill 24/2014 ===
KDB Ijtihad, KDB Darulehsan, KD Selangor, and KD Ganas attended Exercise Hornbill 24/2014 from 18 to 24 November 2014, hosted by both the Royal Brunei Navy and Royal Malaysian Navy.

=== POLMAR 2015 ===
Exercise POLMAR was held by the Royal Brunei Navy and Royal Brunei Marine Police Force for four days at Muara Naval Base from 2 to 5 June 2015. It consisted of Ijtihad, KDB Serasa, and the Naval Action Surface Group.
