= KDB Darulehsan =

Second ship of the Darussalam-class offshore patrol vessel

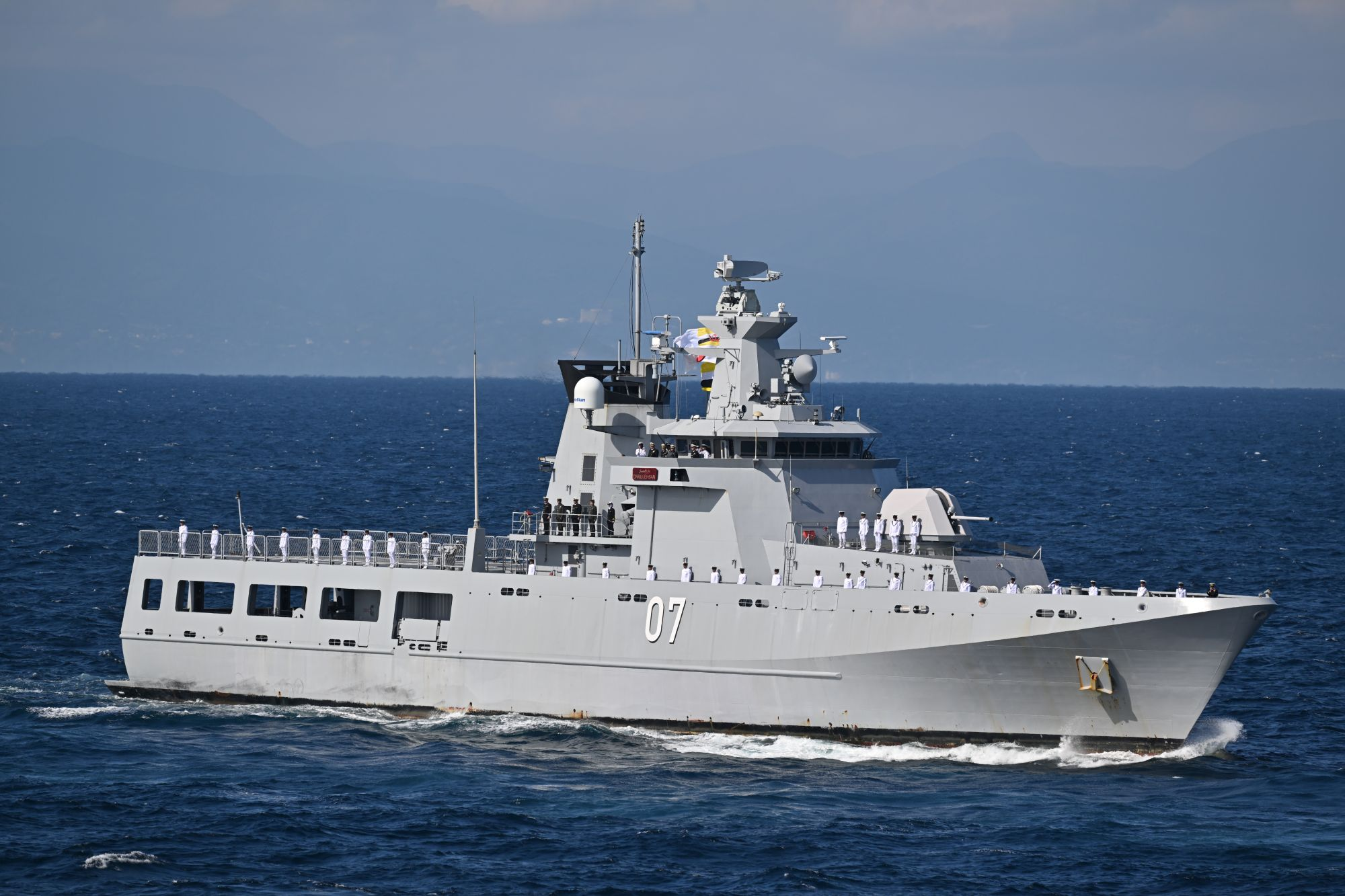
- KDB Darulehsan (07) participating in the International Fleet Review 2022

History

Brunei Darussalam
- Name: Darulehsan; ('Abode of Sincerity' ie. Selangor)
- Namesake: Darulehsan
- Operator: Royal Brunei Navy
- Builder: Lürssen Werft
- Acquired: 5 May 2011; 15 years ago
- Commissioned: 7 May 2011; 15 years ago
- Home port: Muara Naval Base
- Identification: MMSI number: 508111123; call sign: V8DF; pennant number: 07
- Status: active

General characteristics
- Class & type: Darussalam-class offshore patrol vessel
- Displacement: 1,625 tonnes (1,791 tons)
- Length: 80 metres (262 ft 6 in)
- Beam: 13 metres (42 ft 8 in)
- Installed power: 2× MTU 12V diesel engines, 8,500 kilowatts (11,400 shp)
- Speed: 22 knots (41 km/h; 25 mph) maximum
- Range: 7,500 nmi (13,900 km; 8,600 mi)
- Endurance: 21 days
- Boats & landing craft carried: 2x Boomeranger boats; 1x Boomeranger patrol craft (1x 7.62mm gun)
- Complement: 55+
- Sensors & processing systems: Search radar: Terma Scanter 4100; Fire control radars: Thales Sting EO Mk2; Navigation radar: 2× Furuno navigation radar
- Electronic warfare & decoys: ESM: EDO ITT 3601; Decoy: Terma DL-6T Decoy Launching system
- Armament: Guns: 1× Bofors 57 mm Mk3; 2× Oerlikon 20mm/85 KAA; Missiles: 4× Exocet MM40 Block 3
- Aircraft carried: 1× helicopter
- Aviation facilities: helicopter landing platform
- Notes: no helicopters are permanently embarked

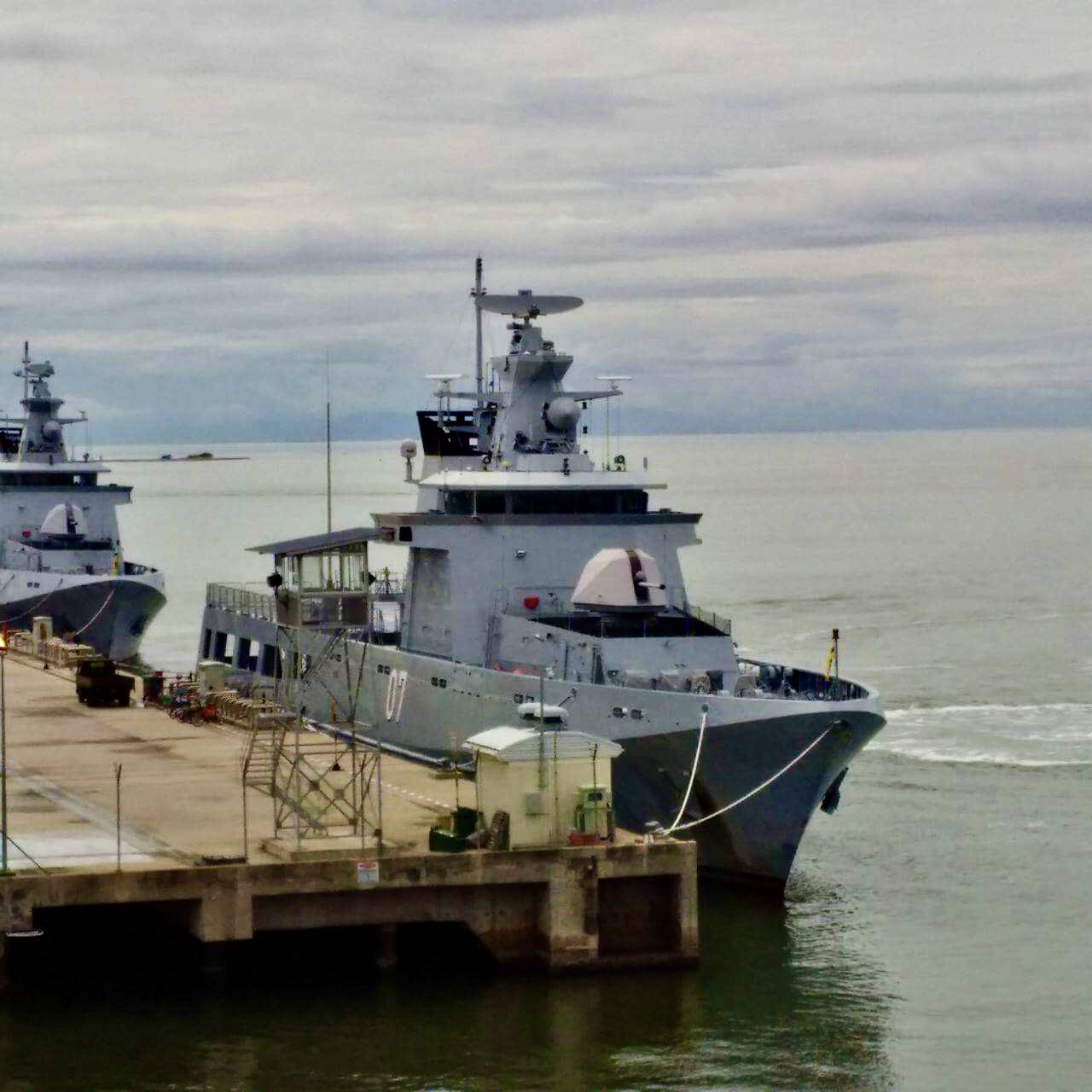
KDB Darulehsan docked at Muara Naval Base, Brunei on 3 November 2016.

KDB Darulehsan (07) is the second ship of the Darussalam class offshore patrol vessels in the sultanate of Brunei Darussalam. The vessel is in active service in the Royal Brunei Navy (RBN) (Malay: Tentera Laut Diraja Brunei, TLDB).

== Offshore patrol vessel programme ==
Brunei Darussalam ordered the Darussalam class from Lürssen Werft in Germany, the same company that Brunei Darussalam contracted to sell the contract-disputed Nakhoda Ragam-class corvettes. The first two Darussalam-class vessels were launched in November 2010 before being delivered to the Royal Brunei Navy at Muara Naval Base in January 2011, and jointly commissioned by the Sultan of Brunei, Hassanal Bolkiah, on 7 May 2011; 15 years ago. The second batch of two ships were delivered by 2014.

== Construction and career ==
KDB Darulehsan was built by Lürssen Werft in Germany around 2009 to 2010. She is part of the first batch of two delivered from Germany to Brunei Darussalam. Darulehsan and Darussalam were commissioned together on 4 May 2011 at Muara Naval Base. All four of her sister ships work in the offshore patrol vessel role. KDB Darulehsan is named for the state of Selangor (known as Darul Ehsan, or 'Abode of Sincerity').

=== Exercise Pelican 2011 ===
Singapore and Brunei concluded their flagship bilateral naval exercise, Exercise Pelican, from 10 to 13 July 2011, which consists of KDB Darulehsan, KDB Syafaat, KDB Itjihad, and RSS Stalwart.

=== WPNS 2014 ===
On 14 April 2014, KDB Darulehsan set sail to Qingdao, China, for 'Western Pacific Naval Symposium 2014' (WPNS 2014). It is the first time the Royal Brunei Navy visited China and participated in one of its naval exercises. KDB Darulehsan returned to port on 5 May 2014.

=== Goodwill visit to Vietnam, 2014 ===
On 30 April 2014, KDB Darulehsan arrived at Haiphong, Vietnam, for a goodwill visit and to enhance diplomatic ties between the two countries.

=== Exercise Hornbill 24/2014 ===
KDB Darulehsan (commanded by Lt Col (L) Willie Padan), KDB Ijtihad, KD Selangor, and KD Ganas attended Exercise Hornbill 24/2014 in Brunei from 18 to 24 November 2014, hosted by both the Royal Brunei Navy and the Royal Malaysian Navy.

=== LIMA'15 ===
KDB Darulehsan was sent on a maritime exercise in Langkawi, Malaysia for 'Langkawi International Maritime & Aerospace Exhibition 2015' (LIMA'15), which lasted from 17–21 March 2015. She returned to Muara Naval Base on 26 March 2015.

=== Exercise Pelican 2015 ===
Singapore and Brunei concluded their flagship bilateral naval exercise on 27 November 2015. Exercise Pelican ran from 23 to 27 November 2015, hosted by the Republic of Singapore Navy. The exercise featured RSS Valiant, RSS Stalwart, KDB Darussalam, and KDB Darulehsan.

=== Exercise Pelican 2019 ===
The Republic of Singapore Navy and Royal Brunei Navy held an exercise which consisted of RSS Tenacious, RSS Valour, RSS Vigour, KDB Darussalam, KDB Darulehsan, and KDB Darulaman. All Republic of Singapore Navy ships left on 7 November 2019.

=== Exercise RIMPAC 2020 ===
KDB Darulehsan joined HMAS Stuart, HMAS Sirius, USS Rafael Peralta, and RSS Supreme on their way to Pearl Harbor, Hawaii, in preparation for RIMPAC 2020 on 6 August.

=== AIME 2023 ===
KDB Darulehsan, captained by Commander Saiful Hazril bin Ali with a ships' complement of 67 crew, took part in the ASEAN-India Maritime Exercise (AIME) 2023 in the South China Sea, a fourteen-day deployment starting on 27 April 2023.

=== ASEX-01 N 2023 ===
KDB Darulehsan took part in the inaugural multilateral naval exercise of the Association of Southeast Asian Nations (ASEAN), attended by vessels from Indonesia, Brunei (KDB Darulehsan), Malaysia (KD Terengganu), and Singapore (RSS Vigour). 'ASEAN Solidarity Exercise in Natuna (ASEX-01 N) 2023' was hosted by the Indonesian Navy, and started with a harbour phase at Batam on 18 September 2023, and was conducted at various locations across the Riau Archipelago. 20 to 23 September was its sea phase in the southern extremes of the South China Sea.
