= Serasa-class landing craft =

Class overview
- Builders: Transfield Shipbuilding, Henderson, Western Australia
- Operators: Royal Brunei Navy
- Preceded by: Damuan class
- Built: 1996
- In commission: 1997–present
- Completed: 2
- Active: 2

General characteristics
- Type: Landing craft light
- Displacement: 220 tonnes (243 tons) (minimum); 370 tonnes (408 tons) (maximum)
- Length: 36.5 metres (119 feet 9 inches)
- Draught: 1.85 metres (6 feet 1 inch)
- Installed power: 1,521 kilowatts (2,040 hp)
- Propulsion: 3x Caterpillar 3508 DITA (direct-injection, turbocharged, aftercooled) 8-cylinder diesel engine
- Speed: 10 knots (19 km/h; 12 mph)
- Range: 1,500 nmi (2,778 km; 1,726 mi)
- Capacity: 100 tonnes (110 tons) cargo
- Complement: 16
- Electronic warfare & decoys: Decca Radar
- Armament: 2x 20 mm/90 cal Oerlikon GAM B01 AA; 2x 7.62 mm machine guns

The Serasa class is a ship class of two light landing craft for Brunei Darussalam. Both were laid down by Transfield Shipbuilding for the Royal Brunei Navy (RBN; Malay: Tentera Laut Diraja Brunei, TLDB) in the August 1996. The lead ship is KDB Serasa (33); KDB being the official acronym for Kapal Diraja Brunei in Malay, meaning Royal Brunei Ship. Currently both ships are in active service in support of Royal Brunei Land Force (RBLF; Tentera Darat Diraja Brunei, TDDB). Both ships were commissioned together on 7 May 1997 at Muara Naval Base, Brunei Darussalam. They are sometimes used to transport supplies, vehicles and personal to specific locations where they are needed.

== Ship in class ==
pennant no.	name	IMO number	builder	launched	commissioned	status
33	KDB Serasa	9143659	Transfield Shipbuilding, Henderson, Western Australia	Aug 1996	7 May 1997	commissioned
34	KDB Teraban	9143661	Transfield Shipbuilding, Henderson, Western Australia	Aug 1996	7 May 1997	commissioned
