= RSS Vigour =

Victory-class corvette of Singapore Navy

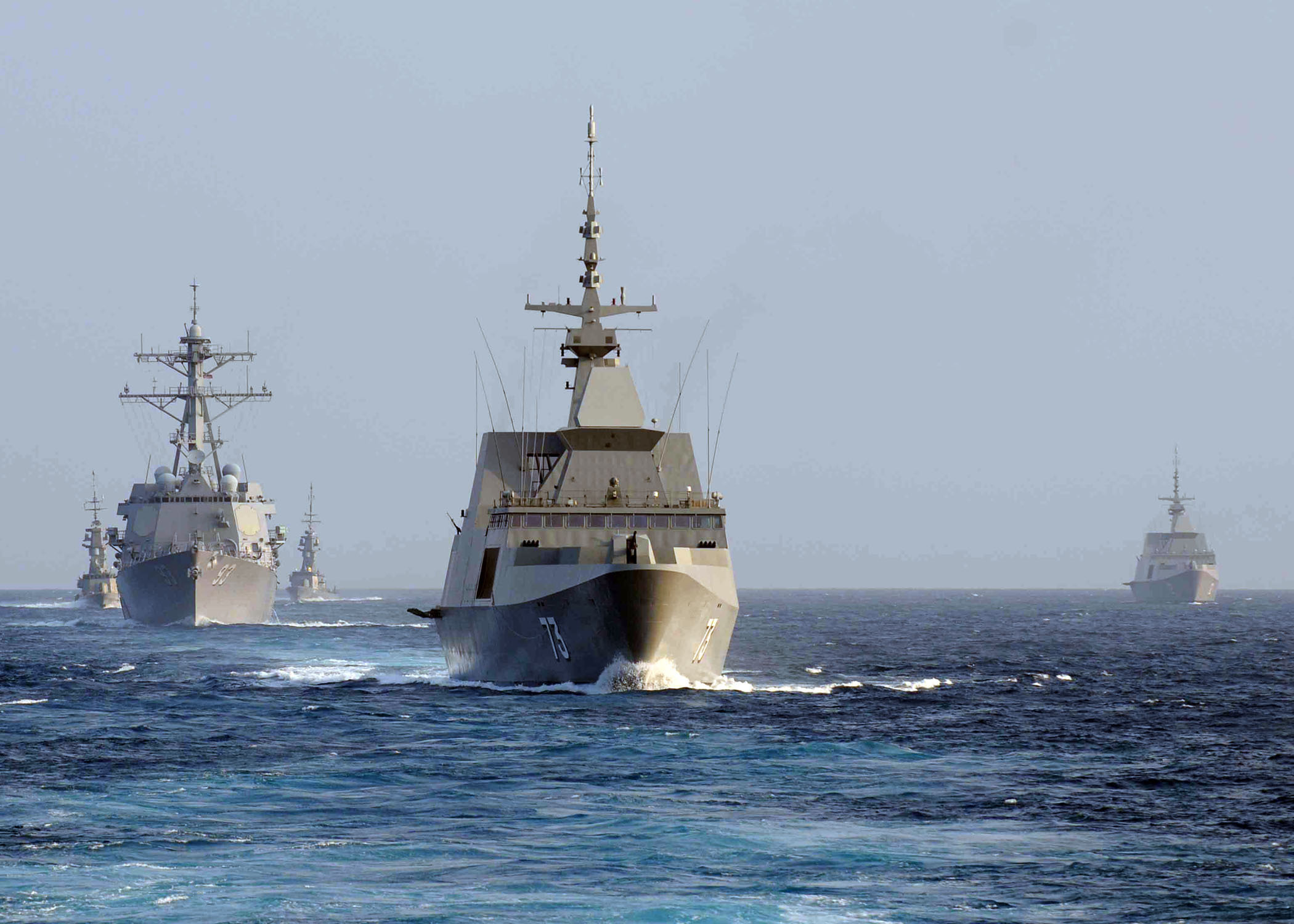
- RSS Vigour alongside RSS Supreme and USS Chung-Hoon on 23 August 2011

History

Singapore
- Name: Vigour
- Namesake: Vigour
- Builder: ST Engineering
- Launched: 1 December 1989
- Commissioned: 25 May 1991
- Home port: Tuas
- Identification: MMSI number: 566011200; Callsign: S6KT; Pennant number: 92
- Motto: Strike With Vigour
- Status: Active

General characteristics
- Class & type: Victory-class corvette
- Displacement: 595 t (586 long tons; 656 short tons)
- Length: 62 m (203 ft 5 in)
- Beam: 8.5 m (27 ft 11 in)
- Draught: 2.6 m (8 ft 6 in)
- Propulsion: 4× Maybach MTU 16 V 538 TB93 high speed diesels coupled to 4× shafts; Total output: 16,900 hp (12,600 kW)
- Speed: Maximum: 37 knots (69 km/h; 43 mph); Cruising: 18 knots (33 km/h; 21 mph)
- Range: 4,000 nmi (7,400 km) at 18 knots (33 km/h; 21 mph)
- Complement: 49 with 8 officers
- Sensors & processing systems: Search radar: Ericsson/Radamec Sea Giraffe 150HC (G/H band) / Saab Sea Giraffe AMB post-2011 SLEP; Navigation radar: Kelvin Hughes 1007 (I band); Weapon control: Elbit MSIS optronic director; Sonar: Thomson Sintra TSM 2064 VDS
- Electronic warfare & decoys: ESM: Elisra SEWS; ECM: RAFAEL RAN 1101 Jammer; Decoys: 2× Plessey Shield 9-barrelled chaff launchers, 2× twin RAFAEL long range chaff launchers fitted below the bridge wings
- Armament: Anti-ship: 4 × Boeing Harpoon; Anti-air: 2 × 8-cell VLS for IAI/RAFAEL Barak; Anti-submarine: EuroTorp A244/S Mod 1 torpedoes launched from 2 × triple-tubes(all removed); Main gun: 1 × Oto Melara 76mm Super Rapid gun; Machine guns: 4 × STK 50MG 12.7 mm (0.50 in) HMGs
- Aircraft carried: 1× Boeing ScanEagle unmanned aerial vehicle (UAV)

RSS Vigour (92) is the fifth ship of the Victory-class corvette of the Republic of Singapore Navy.

== Construction and career ==
Vigour was built by ST Engineering, and launched on 1 December 1989. She was commissioned on 25 May 1991.

=== CARAT 2009 ===
On 15 June 2009, RSS Intrepid, RSS Conqueror, RSS Vigour, RSS Victory, RSS Stalwart, RSS Endeavour, USS Harpers Ferry, USS Chafee, and USS Chung-Hoon participated in the joint exercise in the South China Sea.

=== CARAT 2011 ===
RSS Vigour, RSS Stalwart, and RSS Supreme conducted a joint exercise with USS Chung-Hoon on 23 August 2011.

=== MH370 search and rescue, 2014 ===
RSS Vigour was deployed to conduct the search and rescue operation for the missing MH370, alongside two additional C-130 aircraft, a Formidable-class frigate (RSS Steadfast) with a Sikorsky S-70B naval helicopter on board.

=== Exercise PELICAN 2019 ===
The Republic of Singapore Navy and The Royal Brunei Navy held an exercise which consists of RSS Tenacious, RSS Valour, RSS Vigour, KDB Darussalam, KDB Darulehsan, and KDB Darulaman. All Republic of Singapore Navy ships left on 7 November 2019.

=== Exercise CARAT 2021 ===
The Republic of Singapore Navy and The United States Navy conducted a joint ASEAN-USN exercise in the Philippine Sea. Other ships in attendance are KDB Daruttaqwa, KD Lekiu, KRI Martadinata, UMS Kyansitta and HTMS Kraburi
