= RSS Tenacious =

Ship

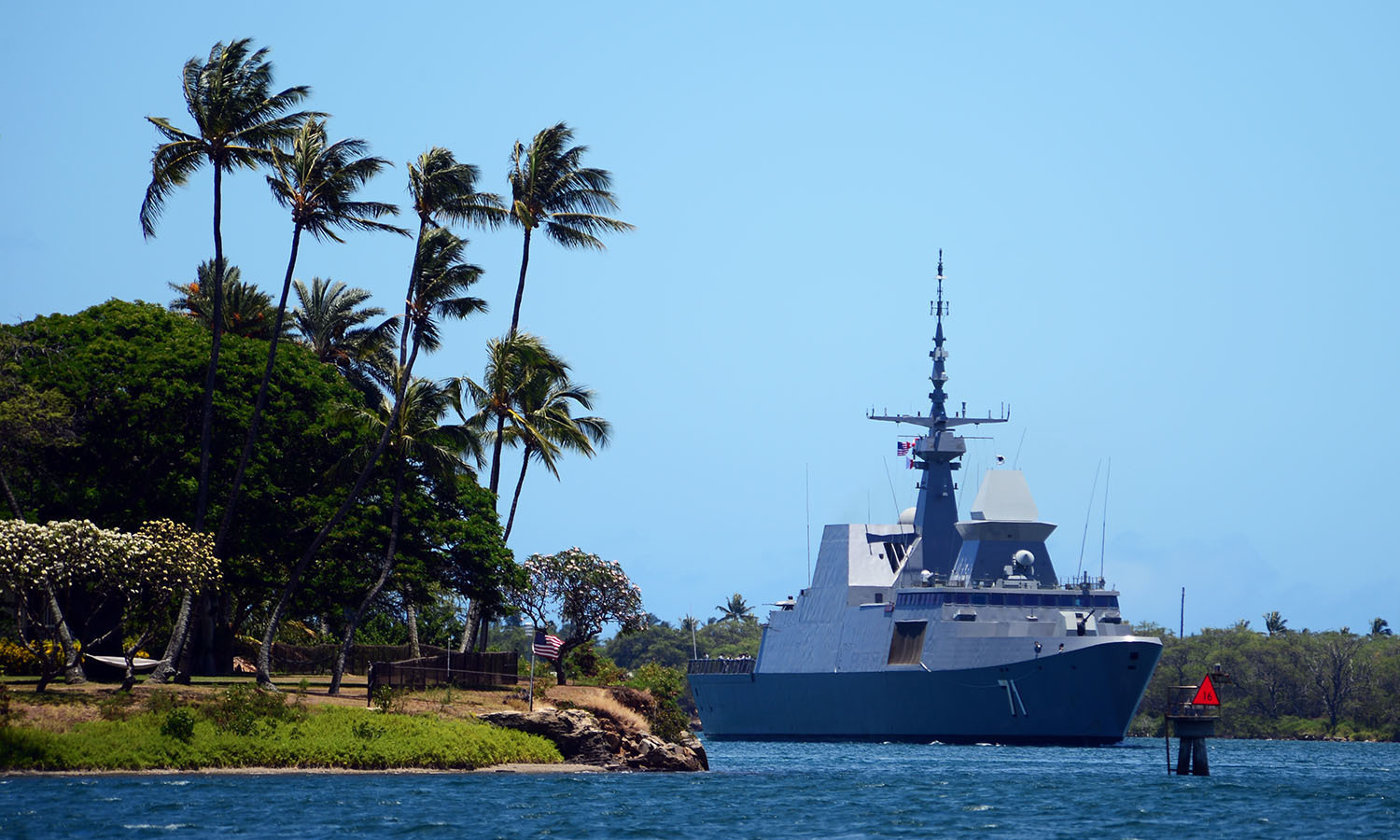
- RSS Tenacious (71) at Pearl Harbor on 24 June 2018

History

Singapore
- Name: Tenacious
- Namesake: Tenacious
- Ordered: March 2000
- Builder: ST Engineering
- Launched: 15 July 2005
- Commissioned: 5 February 2008
- Home port: Changi Naval Base
- Identification: MMSI number: 566011700; Callsign: S6KL; Pennant number: 71
- Motto: Yield to None
- Status: Active

General characteristics
- Class & type: Formidable-class frigate
- Displacement: 3,200 tonnes (3,100 long tons; 3,500 short tons)
- Length: 114.8 m (376 ft 8 in)
- Beam: 16.3 m (53 ft 6 in)
- Draught: 6.0 m (19 ft 8 in)
- Installed power: 4 × ISM V1708 diesel generators, each producing 860 kilowatts (1,150 shp); Total output: 3,440 kW (4,610 shp)
- Propulsion: Combined diesel and diesel (CODAD) arrangement; 4 × MTU 20V 8000 M90, each rated at 9,100 kW (12,200 shp); Total output: 36,400 kW (48,800 shp)
- Speed: Maximum: 27 knots (50 km/h; 31 mph); Cruising: 18 kn (33 km/h; 21 mph)
- Range: 4,200 nautical miles (7,800 km)
- Complement: 71, excluding air crew detachment of approx. 19
- Sensors & processing systems: Search radar: Thales Herakles multi-function passive electronically scanned array radar; Navigation radar: Terma Electronic Scanter 2001; Sonar: EDO Model 980 active low frequency towed sonar (ALOFTS)
- Electronic warfare & decoys: ESM: RAFAEL C-PEARL-M; Decoys: Sagem Défense Sécurité New Generation Dagaie System, 2 × forward & 1 × aft; Leonardo Finmeccanica Morpheus anti-torpedo suite with WASS C310 launchers, 2 x aft
- Armament: Anti-ship: 8 (Up to 24) × RGM-84C Harpoon SSMs, to be replaced by Blue Spear SSM; Anti-air: 16-cell Sylver A50 VLS for MBDA Aster 15/30, 16-cell Sylver A43 VLS for MBDA Aster 15; Anti-submarine: 2 × B515 triple tubes with reloads for EuroTorp A244/S Mod 3 torpedoes; Guns: 1x OTO Melara 76mm Super Rapid gun; 4 × STK 50MG 12.7 mm (0.50 in) HMG; 2 × 25mm Mk 38 Mod2 Typhoon Weapon Station Stabilised Gun; Non-lethal: Long-Range Acoustic Device 500 Xtreme (LRAD500X)
- Aircraft carried: 1× S-70B Seahawk multi-mission capable naval helicopter
- Aviation facilities: Flight deck and enclosed hangar for up to two medium-lift helicopters

RSS Tenacious (71) is the fourth ship of the Formidable-class frigate stealth frigate of the Republic of Singapore Navy.

== Construction and career ==
RSS Tenacious was built by ST Marine Engineering company in Singapore in the late 2000s. Tenacious was commissioned on 5 February 2008.

=== RIMPAC 2018 ===
RSS Tenacious arrived at Pearl Harbor on 25 June 2018 for RIMPAC 2018, which took place from 27 June to 2 August 2018. During the RIMPAC exercise, RSS Tenacious successfully test fired her Harpoon missiles.

=== Exercise PELICAN 2019 ===
The Republic of Singapore Navy and the Royal Brunei Navy held an exercise which consists of RSS Tenacious, RSS Valour, RSS Vigour, KDB 06, KDB Darulehsan, and KDB Darulaman. All Republic of Singapore Navy ships left on 7 November 2019.

=== SIMTEX 2019 ===
Singapore, India, and Thailand held a Naval exercise called SIMTEX on 11 October 2019. RSS Tenacious, HTMS Kraburi, INS Ranvir, INS Kora, and INS Sukanya participated in the exercise.

=== Exercise Indopura 2021 ===
RSS Tenacious participated in Exercise Indopura 2021, together with the Indonesian Navy.

=== Exercise Pacific Griffin 2021 ===
RSS Tenacious led three other ships, RSS Stalwart, RSS Fearless, and MV Avatar to participate in Exercise Pacific Griffin 2021, together with the United States Navy. The two month long exercise involved numerous assets, including 2 F15SG fighter jets to conduct a joint missile firing together with her sister ship RSS Stalwart. In addition, the participating ships conducted Aster missile firing and torpedo firing exercises.

=== Exercise MILAN 2022 ===
RSS Tenacious participated in Exercise MILAN, a multinational exercise involving more than 30 nations organised by the Indian Navy. During the sea phase, RSS Tenacious participated in air defence, gunnery, and anti-submarine warfare drills, together with the multinational task force.

=== Exercise SIMBEX 2024 ===
The ship also participated in the 31st edition of Singapore India Maritime Bilateral Exercise (SIMBEX) whose Harbour and Sea phase was conducted from 23 to 25 October 2024 and from 28 to 29 October 2024 at Visakhapatnam, India. Indian Navy's INS Shivalik was also a part of the exercise.

== Gallery ==
gallery of images of RSS Tenacious
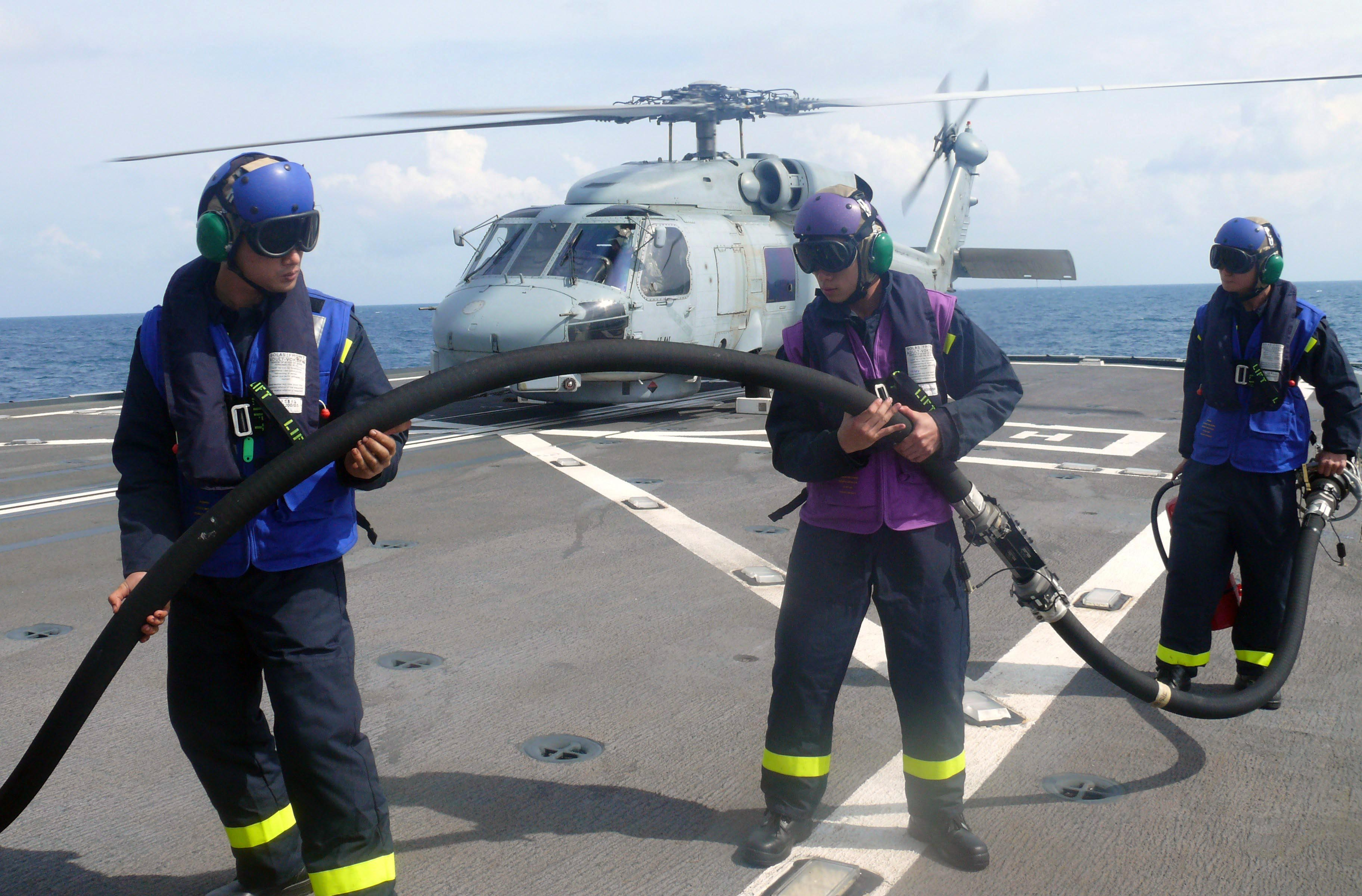
Flight deck crew of RSS Tenacious perform refuels the helicopter Lonewolf 50 of Helicopter Antisubmarine Squadron Light 45 on 26 June 2008.

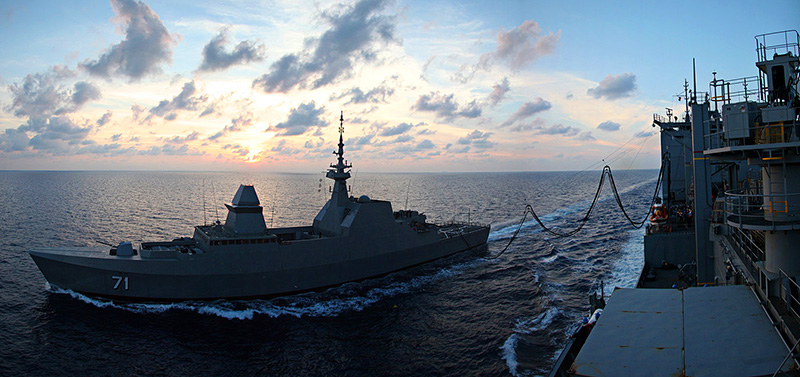
RSS Tenacious alongside USNS Alan Shepard on 25 May 2010.

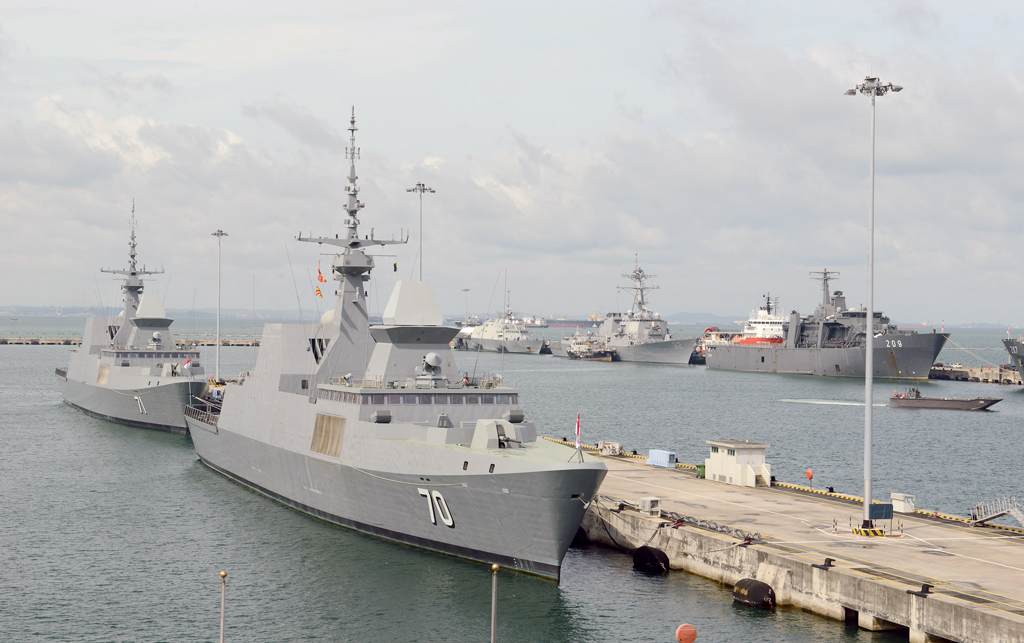
RSS Tenacious docked behind RSS Steadfast in Changi Naval Base during CARAT 2015.
