= Damuan-class landing craft =

Class overview
- Builders: Cheverton Workboats, Cowes
- Operators: Royal Brunei Navy
- Succeeded by: Serasa-class landing crafts
- Built: 1976
- In commission: 1976–present
- Completed: 2
- Active: 1
- Retired: 1

General characteristics
- Type: Utility landing craft
- Displacement: 50+ tons
- Capacity: 30 tons cargo
- Complement: 5
- Electronic warfare & decoys: Decca Radar

The Damuan class is a ship class of two utility landing craft for Brunei Darussalam. Both were laid down by Cheverton Workboats in Cowes, England for Brunei Darussalam, to be operated by the Royal Brunei Navy (RBN; Malay: Tentera Laut Diraja Brunei, TLDB). The lead ship is KDB Damuan (31); KDB is the official acronym for Kapal Diraja Brunei in Malay, meaning Royal Brunei Ship. Currently, both ships are in active service in support of Royal Brunei Land Force. Damuan was commissioned in 1976, while Puni was commissioned in 1977 at Muara Naval Base, Brunei Darussalam.

On 11 September 2007, a group of 50 youths from the mosques of Kg Menangah Mosque and Bukit Sulang Tutong District made a study visit to the Royal Brunei Navy Base. The purpose of the group was to make the visit to learn about the duties and responsibilities and role of Royal Brunei Navy, learn about its equipment, and then given the opportunity to board KDB Puni (32) and to offer their prayers on its deck.

== Ships in class ==
pennant no.	name	builder	launched	commissioned	status
31	KDB Damuan	Cheverton Workboats, Cowes, England	1976	1976	decommissioned
32	KDB Puni	Cheverton Workboats, Cowes, England	1977	1977	commissioned as in-port scuba diver tender
