= KDB Darulaman =

Third ship of the Darussalam-class offshore patrol vessel

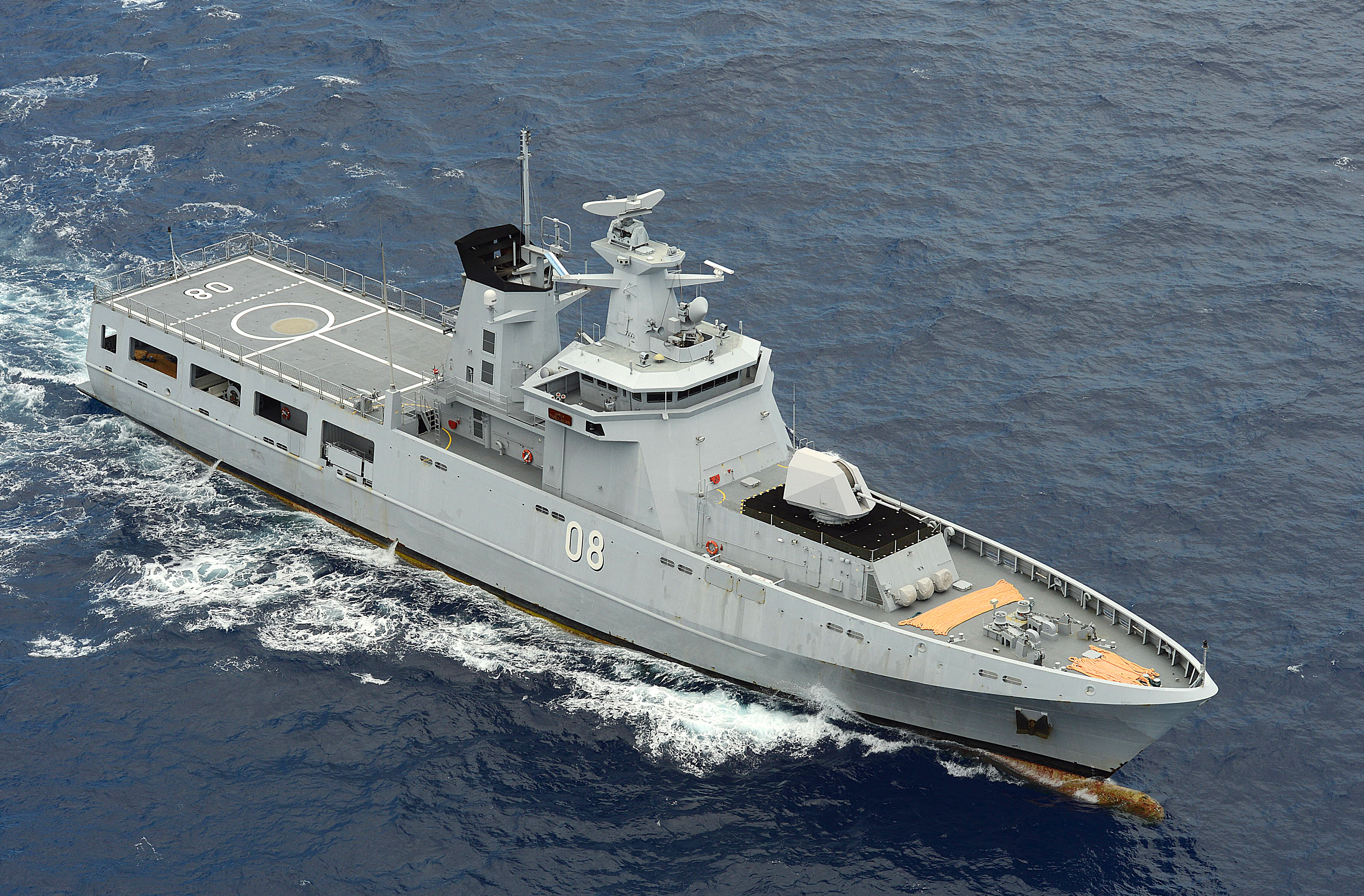
- KDB Darulaman participating in RIMPAC 2014.

History

Brunei Darussalam
- Name: Darulaman; (Abode of Security)
- Namesake: Darulaman
- Operator: Royal Brunei Navy
- Builder: Lürssen Werft
- Acquired: August 2011; 15 years ago
- Commissioned: 12 August 2011; 15 years ago
- Home port: Muara Naval Base
- Identification: MMSI number: 508111123; call sign: V8DG; pennant number: 08
- Status: active

General characteristics
- Class & type: Darussalam-class offshore patrol vessel
- Displacement: 1,625 tonnes (1,791 tons)
- Length: 80 metres (262 ft 6 in)
- Beam: 13 metres (42 ft 8 in)
- Installed power: 2× MTU 12V diesel engines, 8,500 kilowatts (11,400 shp)
- Speed: 22 knots (41 km/h; 25 mph) maximum
- Range: 7,500 nmi (13,900 km; 8,600 mi)
- Endurance: 21 days
- Boats & landing craft carried: 2x Boomeranger boats; 1x Boomeranger patrol craft (1x 7.62mm gun)
- Complement: 55+
- Sensors & processing systems: Search radar: Terma Scanter 4100; Fire control radars: Thales Sting EO Mk2; Navigation radar: 2× Furuno navigation radar
- Electronic warfare & decoys: ESM: EDO ITT 3601; Decoy: Terma DL-6T Decoy Launching system
- Armament: Guns: 1× Bofors 57 mm Mk3; 2× Oerlikon 20mm/85 KAA; Missiles: 4× Exocet MM40 Block 3
- Aircraft carried: 1× helicopter
- Aviation facilities: helicopter landing platform
- Notes: no helicopters are permanently embarked

KDB Darulaman (08) is the third ship of the Darussalam-class offshore patrol vessels in the sultanate of Brunei Darussalam. The vessel is in active service in the Royal Brunei Navy (RBN).

== Offshore patrol vessel programme ==
Brunei Darussalam ordered the Darussalam class from Lürssen Werft in Germany, the same company that Brunei Darussalam contracted to sell the contract-disputed Nakhoda Ragam-class corvettes. The first two Darussalam-class vessels were launched in November 2010 before being delivered to the Royal Brunei Navy at Muara Naval Base in January 2011. The second batch of two ships were delivered by 2014.

== Construction and career ==
KDB Darulaman was built by Lürssen Werft company in Germany around 2010. She is part of the second batch of two delivered from Germany to Brunei Darussalam. KDB Darulaman was commissioned on 12 August 2011 at Muara Naval Base. All four sister ships work in the offshore patrol vessel role. KDB Darulaman is named for 'Abode of Security'.

=== MILAN 2012 ===
During the MILAN 2012, an exercise was hosted by the Indian Navy which KDB Darulaman was also participated.

=== RIMPAC 2014 ===
Darulaman and KDB Darussalam (06) fired their missile systems for the first time. They successfully conducted their first Excoet MM40 Block II surface-to-surface missile firing at the Pacific Missile Range Facility, 80 nautical miles (150 km; 92 mi) north of Kaua’i Island.

Both RBN ships participated in Exercise RIMPAC in 2014, hosted by the United States Third Fleet off Hawaii. The ships participated in the SINKEX exercise. Darussalam and Darulaman simultaneously fired their Exocet missiles, which struck the target which was the ex-USS Tuscaloosa.

=== CARAT 2018 ===
KDB Darulaman, KDB Berkat, USNS Fall River, and USS Emory S. Land conducted Cooperation Afloat Readiness and Training (CARAT) to strengthen the relations between Brunei Darussalam and United States of America. It took place in the South China Sea on 15 November 2018.

=== AUMX 2019 ===
KDB Darulaman, BRP Ramon Alcaraz, RSS Tenacious, UMS Kyan Sittha, HTMS Krabi, USS Montgomery, and USS Wayne E. Meyer attended the US-ASEAN Maritime Exercise (AUMX) in the Gulf of Thailand on 3 September 2019, which ended in Singapore.

=== CARAT 2019 ===
KDB Darulaman, KDB Syafaat, USNS Millinocket, and USS Montgomery conducted Cooperation Afloat Readiness and Training (CARAT) to strengthen the relations between Brunei Darussalam and United States of America. It took place in the South China Sea on 29 October 2019.

=== Exercise PELICAN 2019 ===
Republic of Singapore Navy and Royal Brunei Navy held an exercise which consists of RSS Tenacious, RSS Valour, RSS Vigour, KDB Darussalam (06), KDB Darulehsan (07) and KDB Darulaman. All Republic of Singapore Navy ships left on 7 November 2019.

== Gallery ==
gallery of images of KDB Darulaman
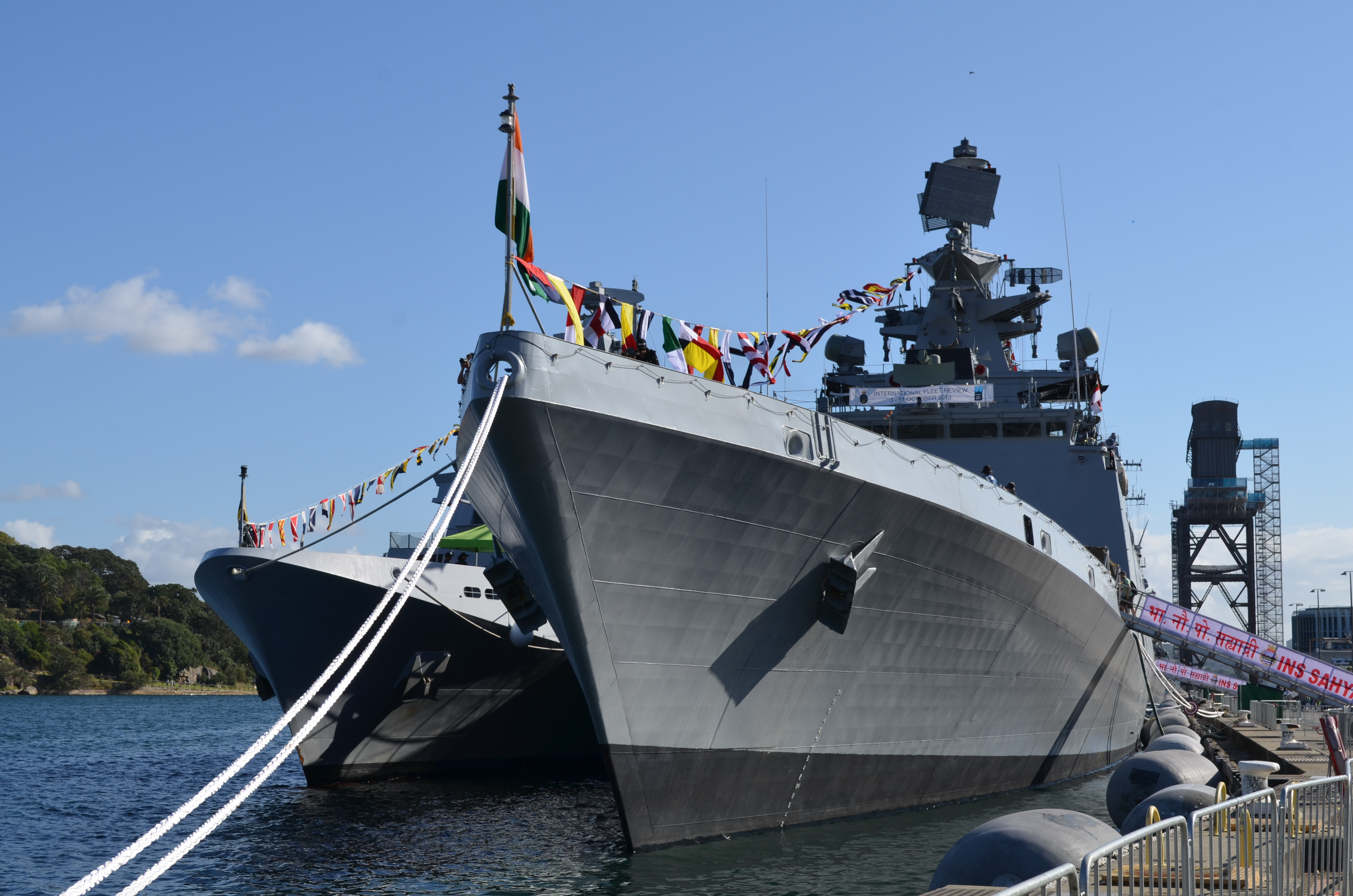
INS Sahyadri and KDB Darulaman at Fleet Base East, Australia on 7 October 2013.

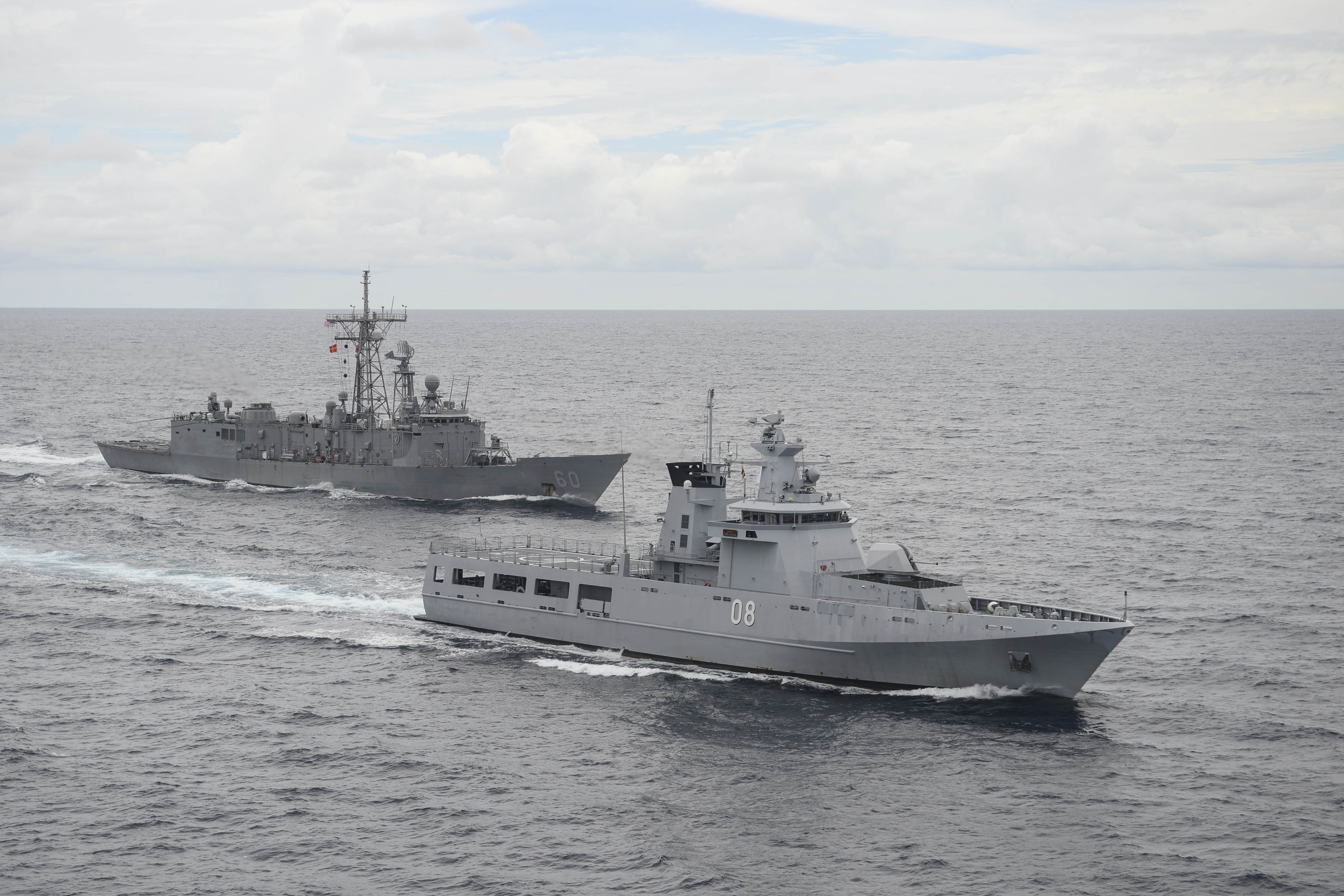
KDB Darulaman alongside USS Rodney M. Davis during CARAT 2014.

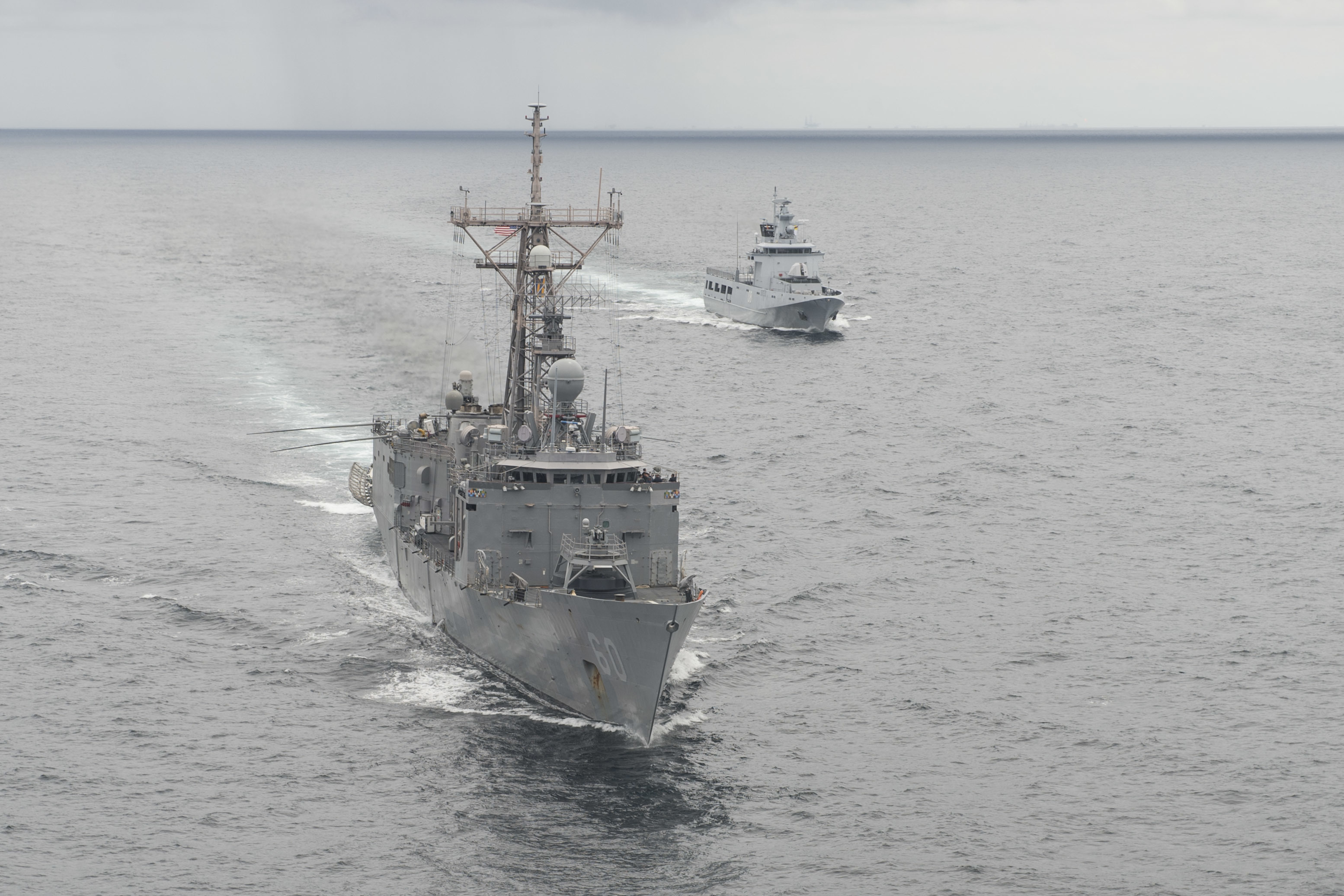
USS Rodney M. Davis alongside KDB Darulaman during CARAT 2014.
