= KDB Afiat =

Ijtihad-class patrol boat in the Royal Brunei Navy

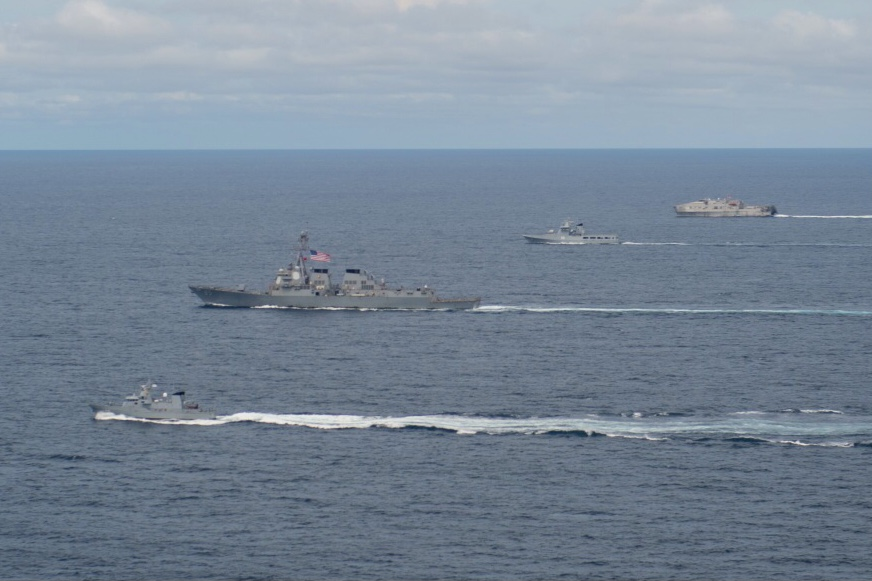
- KDB Afiat (20) underway during CARAT 2016

History

Brunei Darussalam
- Name: Afiat (Safety)
- Namesake: Afiat
- Operator: Royal Brunei Navy
- Builder: Lürssen Werft
- Launched: 2009
- Acquired: 27 August 2010; 16 years ago
- Commissioned: 28 August 2010; 16 years ago
- Home port: Muara Naval Base
- Identification: pennant number: 20
- Status: active

General characteristics
- Class & type: Ijtihad-class patrol boat
- Displacement: 262 tonnes (258 long tons; 289 short tons)
- Length: 41 metres (134 ft 6 in)
- Beam: 7.7 metres (25 ft 3 in)
- Draught: 1.9 metres (6 ft 3 in)
- Installed power: 2x diesel engines, 6,670 kW (8,940 hp)
- Propulsion: 2x propellers
- Speed: 30 knots (56 km/h; 35 mph) maximum
- Complement: 16 (+5 embarked)
- Sensors & processing systems: 1x navigation radar 1x MEOS ESM
- Armament: 1× Rheinmetall MLG 27 mm gun

KDB Afiat (20) is the fourth and last ship of the Itjihad-class patrol boats. The vessel is in active service in the Royal Brunei Navy (RBN).

== Development ==
=== Background ===
A total of four Ijtihad-class fast patrol boats were commissioned into service with the Royal Brunei Navy (RBN), where two of the ships began operating since March 2010, followed by another two on 28 August 2010.

Two Ijtihad-class fast patrol boats arrived in Brunei Darussalam on 27 August 2010. The boats, given the prefix Malay: Kapal Diraja Brunei (KDB) and named Syafaat and Afiat were commissioned by the Royal Brunei Navy at Muara Naval Base. They are part of the project between the government of Brunei Darussalam and Lürssen Werft.

The commissioning ceremony of both vessels was officiated by Major General Aminuddin Ihsan, the then Commander of the Royal Brunei Armed Forces (RBAF / ABDB). Like previous fast patrol boats, Syafaat and Afiat were produced in Germany and completed sea trials. Ijtihad and Berkat began operations on 15 March 2010.

== Construction and career ==
Afiat was built by Lürssen Werft company in Germany around 2009. She is part of the second batch of two vessels delivered from Germany to Brunei Darussalam. Afiat and Syafaat were commissioned together on 27 August 2010 at Muara Naval Base. All four ships work in the patrol craft role.

=== Exercise Hornbill 21/2011 ===
The Royal Malaysian Navy and Royal Brunei Navy concluded the military exercise Exercise Hornbill from 19 to 23 December 2011, which consisted of Afiat, Ijtihad, KD Kedah, and KD Ganas.

=== Exercise PELICAN 2013 ===
The Republic of Singapore Navy and the Royal Brunei Navy held a naval exercise which consists of Afiat, Darulehsan (07), RSS Tenacious, and RSS Valour in March 2013.

=== 2017 rescue ===
On 12 June 2017, Afiat responded to an SOS call of five local fishermen who were drifting at sea after the engines on their boat stopped working. Afiat rescued and took all fishermen back to land in good health. This is the second successful mission of this type completed by the Royal Brunei Navy.
