= KDB Darussalam =

Darussalam-class offshore patrol vessel lead ship

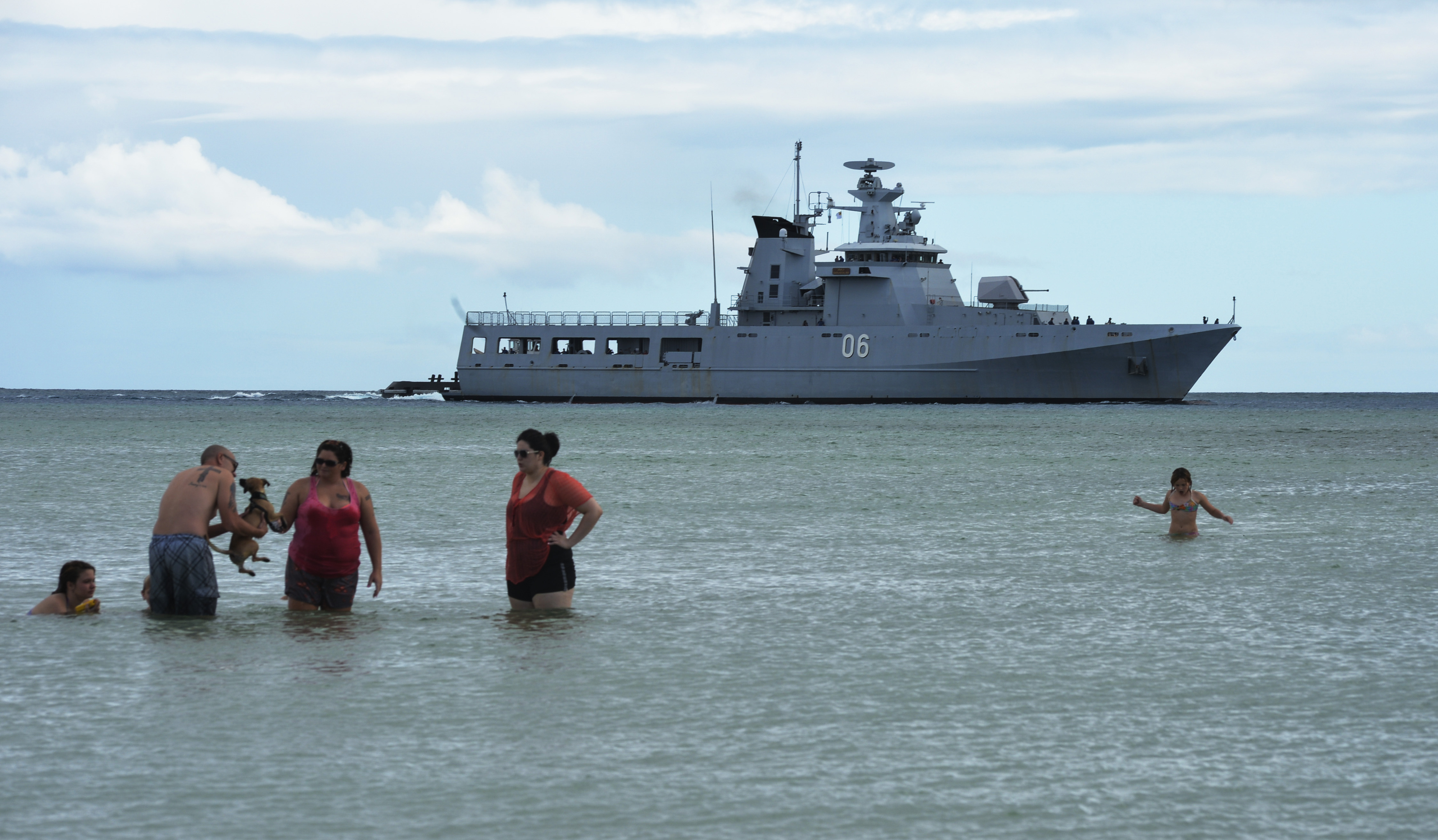
- KDB Darussalam at Pearl Harbor, Hawaii during RIMPAC 2014

History

Brunei Darussalam
- Name: Darussalam; (Abode of Peace)
- Namesake: Darussalam
- Operator: Royal Brunei Navy
- Builder: Lürssen Werft
- Acquired: 4 May 2011; 15 years ago
- Commissioned: 7 May 2011; 15 years ago
- Home port: Muara Naval Base
- Identification: MMSI number: 508111122; call sign: V8DE; pennant number: 06
- Status: active

General characteristics
- Class & type: Darussalam-class offshore patrol vessel
- Displacement: 1,625 tonnes (1,599 long tons; 1,791 short tons)
- Length: 80 metres (262 ft 6 in)
- Beam: 13 metres (42 ft 8 in)
- Installed power: 2× MTU 12V diesel engines, 8,500 kilowatts (11,400 shp)
- Speed: 22 knots (41 km/h; 25 mph) maximum
- Range: 7,500 nmi (13,900 km; 8,600 mi)
- Endurance: 21 days
- Boats & landing craft carried: 2x Boomeranger boats; 1x Boomeranger patrol craft (1x 7.62mm gun)
- Complement: 55+
- Sensors & processing systems: Search radar: Terma Scanter 4100; Fire control radars: Thales Sting EO MK2; Navigation radar: 2× Furuno navigation radar
- Electronic warfare & decoys: ESM: EDO ITT 3601; Decoy: Terma DL-6T Decoy Launching system
- Armament: Guns: 1× Bofors 57 mm Mk3; 2× Oerlikon 20mm/85 KAA; Missiles: 4× Exocet MM40 Block 3
- Aircraft carried: 1× helicopter
- Aviation facilities: Helicopter landing platform
- Notes: no helicopters are permanently embarked

KDB Darussalam (06) is the lead ship of her class of offshore patrol vessels in the sultanate of Brunei Darussalam. The vessel is in active service in the Royal Brunei Navy (RBN, Malay: Tentera Laut Diraja Brunei, TLDB).

== Offshore patrol vessel programme ==
Brunei Darussalam ordered the Darussalam class from Lürssen Werft in Germany, the same company that Brunei Darussalam contracted to sell the contract-disputed Nakhoda Ragam-class corvettes. The first two Darussalam-class vessels were launched in November 2010 before being delivered to the Royal Brunei Navy at Muara Naval Base in January 2011, and jointly commissioned by the Sultan of Brunei, Hassanal Bolkiah, in May 2011. The second batch of two ships were delivered by 2014.

== Construction and career ==
KDB Darussalam was built by Lürssen Werft company in Germany around the late 2000s. She is part of the first batch of two vessels delivered from Germany to Brunei. Darussalam and Darulehsan commissioned together on 4 May 2011 at Muara Naval Base. All four of her sister ships work in the offshore patrol vessel role.

=== RIMPAC 2014 ===
Darussalam and Darulaman fired their missile systems for the first time. They successfully conducted their first Excoet MM40 Block II surface-to-surface missile firing at the Pacific Missile Range Facility, 80 nautical miles (150 kilometres; 92 miles) north of Kaua’i Island.

Both Royal Brunei Navy (RBN / TLDB) ships participated in Exercise RIMPAC in 2014, hosted by the United States Third Fleet from Hawaii. The ships participated in the SINKEX exercise. Darussalam and Darulaman simultaneously fired their Exocet missiles, which struck the target which was the ex-USS Tuscaloosa.

=== Exercise Pelican 2015 ===
Singapore and Brunei Darussalam concluded their flagship bilateral naval exercise on 27 November. Exercise Pelican ran from 23 to 27 November 2015, it was hosted by the Republic of Singapore Navy. The exercise featured RSS Valiant, RSS Stalwart, Darussalam and Darulehsan.

=== SEAGULL 2016 ===
Darussalam participated in the ASEAN Defence Minister Meeting-Plus Maritime Security and Counter Terrorism Exercise, the SEAGULL 07/16 Exercise was officially inaugurated between the Royal Brunei Navy and Philippine Navy. Representing both navies were Darussalam and BRP Gregorio del Pilar, with both ships departing Changi Naval Base on 12 May 2016.

The exercise integrated the ADMM-Plus ships to strengthen their capability and inter-operability in effectively addressing terrorism and maritime threats, as they are put through realistic sea and land based scenarios. The effort from the ADMM-Plus ships showed their continuous commitment in enhancing regional peace and stability.

=== PASSEX 2018 ===
On 7 March 2018, the French frigate Vendémiaire made a goodwill visit to Muara Naval Base after sailing from Hong Kong. On 9 March, Vendémiaire conducted a PASSEX with Darussalam, before sailing to the Philippines.

=== Exercise PELICAN 2019 ===
Republic of Singapore and Royal Brunei Navy held an exercise which consists of RSS Tenacious, RSS Valour, RSS Vigour, KDB Darussalam, KDB Darulehsan, and KDB Darulaman. All Republic of Singapore Navy ships left on 7 November 2019.

== Gallery ==
gallery of images of KDB Darussalam
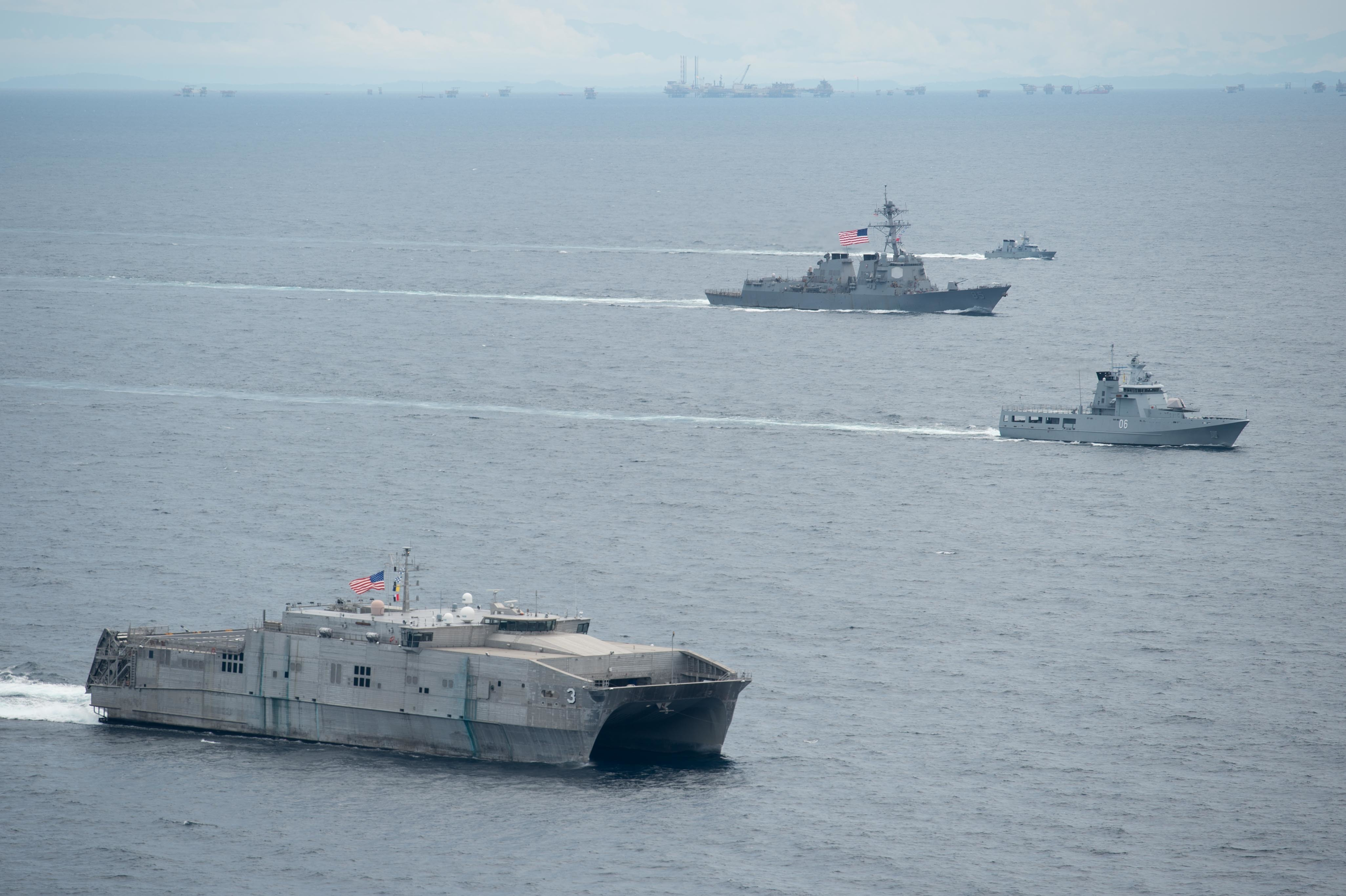
KDB Darussalam (06), KDB Afiat (20), USS McCampbell, and USNS Millinocket during CARAT 2016.

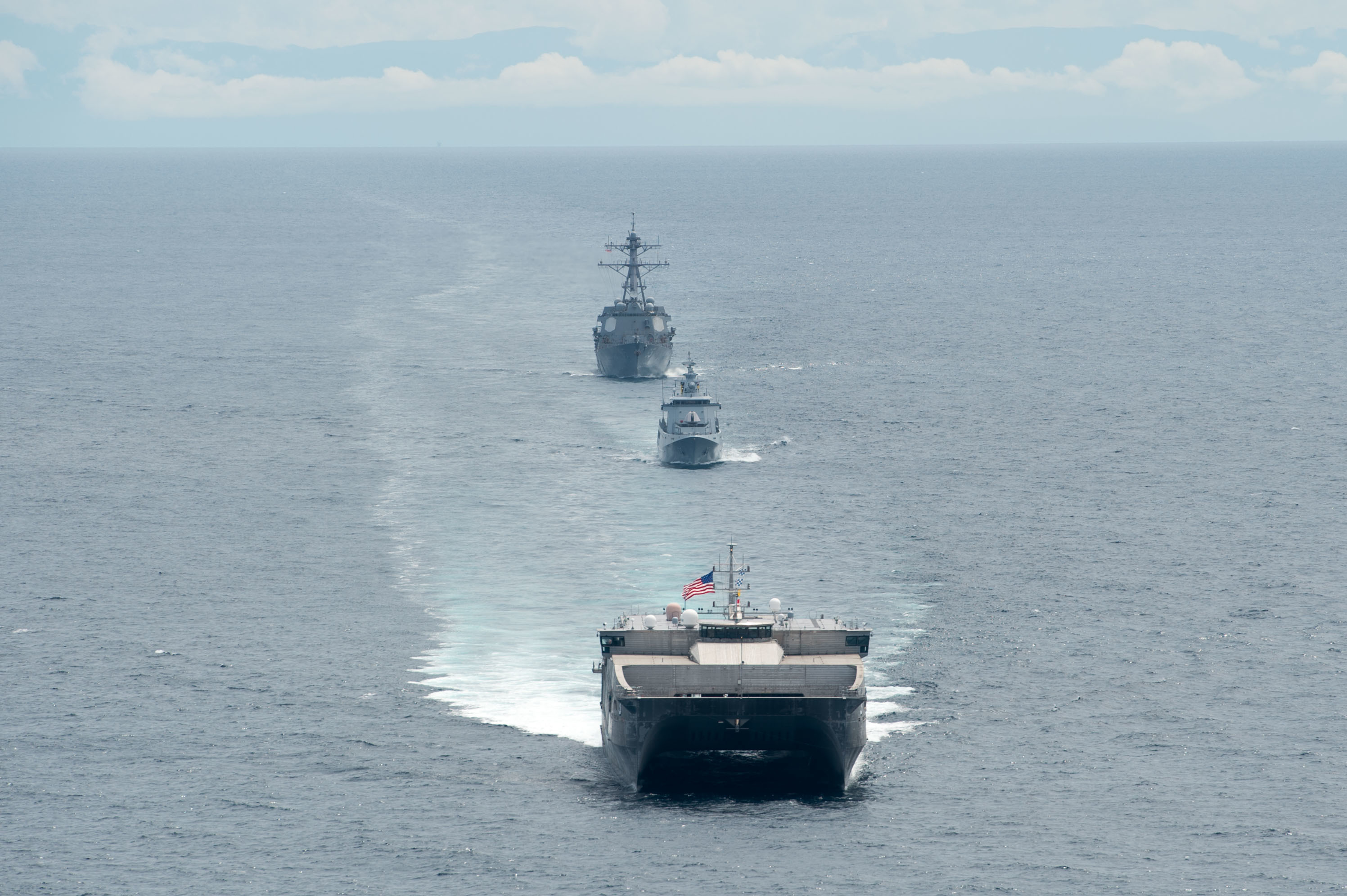
KDB Darussalam (06), KDB Afiat (20), USS McCampbell, and USNS Millinocket during CARAT 2016.

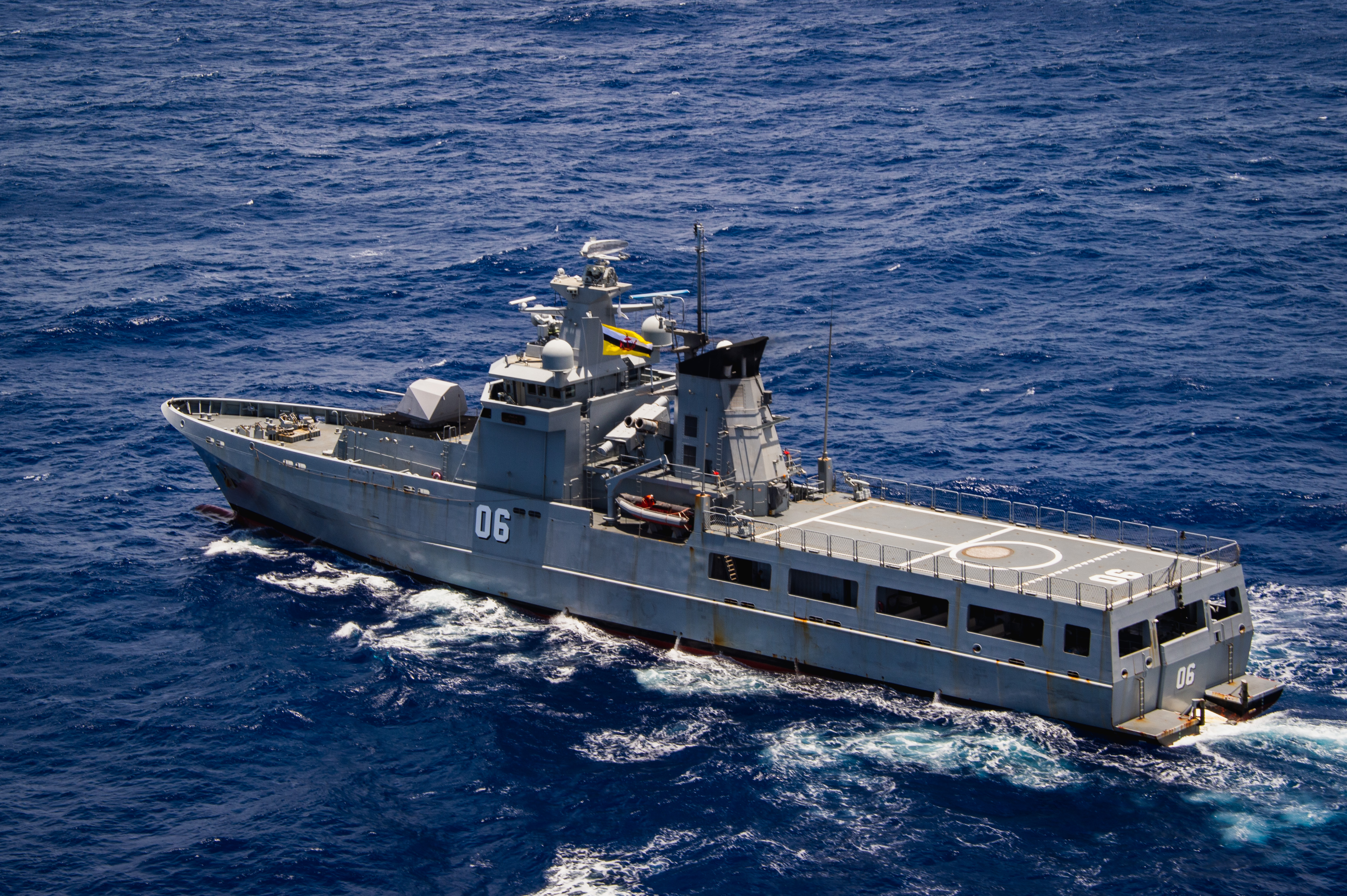
KDB Darussalam during RIMPAC 2024.
