= ASEAN Multilateral Naval Exercise =

ASEAN's multilateral naval exercise

ASEAN Multilateral Naval Exercise (AMNEX)
- Genre: Multinational military exercise
- Location: Southeast Asia
- Inaugurated: 2017
- Most recent: 2025
- Participants: Navies of ASEAN

The ASEAN Multilateral Naval Exercise (AMNEX) is a regular naval exercise held by the navies of the Association of Southeast Asian Nations (ASEAN). It aims to build trust, improve skills, and make it easier for ASEAN navies to work together at sea. AMNEX focuses on non-combat areas like maritime safety, search and rescue, humanitarian assistance and disaster relief (HADR), and protection of the marine environment.

== History ==
AMNEX was first proposed by the Royal Thai Navy and agreed at the 8th ASEAN Navy Chiefs’ Meeting in 2014. The first AMNEX (AMNEX-1) was hosted by Thailand in November 2017 around Pattaya in the Gulf of Thailand with the theme “Protection and Preservation of the Marine Environment.” The second AMNEX took place in the Philippines on 12–15 May 2023, based in Subic, with both shore and sea phases and an ASEAN Fleet Review. The third AMNEX was hosted by Malaysia on 16–22 August 2025 in Penang, alongside the 19th ASEAN Navy Chiefs’ Meeting (ANCM), an ASEAN Navies’ City Parade, and an ASEAN Fleet Review.

== Aims and activities ==
AMNEX builds simple, common procedures among ASEAN navies. Typical activities include:

- communications drills and maneuvering,
- maritime search and rescue,
- HADR and medical cooperation,
- maritime interdiction and boarding practice,
- environmental protection and spill response,
- port-call cultural and sports events.

== Editions ==
The table below lists all editions. (Note: There was no AMNEX in 2024; the sequence is 2017, 2023, 2025.)

Edition	Year	Host country (host navy)	Dates	Main location(s) / areas	Selected activities and notes	Ref.
1st (AMNEX-1)	2017	Thailand (Royal Thai Navy)	13–22 November 2017	Pattaya; Gulf of Thailand	Theme: “Protection and Preservation of the Marine Environment”; at-port and at-sea phases; maritime interception, logistics at sea, airborne supply, and marine environmental protection drills.	
2nd (AMNEX-2)	2023	Philippines (Philippine Navy)	12–15 May 2023	Subic Bay and waters off Subic (Luzon)	Shore phase and opening at Naval Operating Base Subic; sea phase with SAR, maneuvering, and comms drills; ASEAN Fleet Review (11 May).	
3rd (AMNEX-3)	2025	Malaysia (Royal Malaysian Navy)	16–22 August 2025	Penang; adjacent waters	With 19th ANCM, ASEAN Navies’ City Parade, and ASEAN Fleet Review; participation of ~10 ships and >1,200 personnel (per organizers); RSN RSS Vigour among participants.	

== See also ==
- ASEAN
