= KDB Berkat =

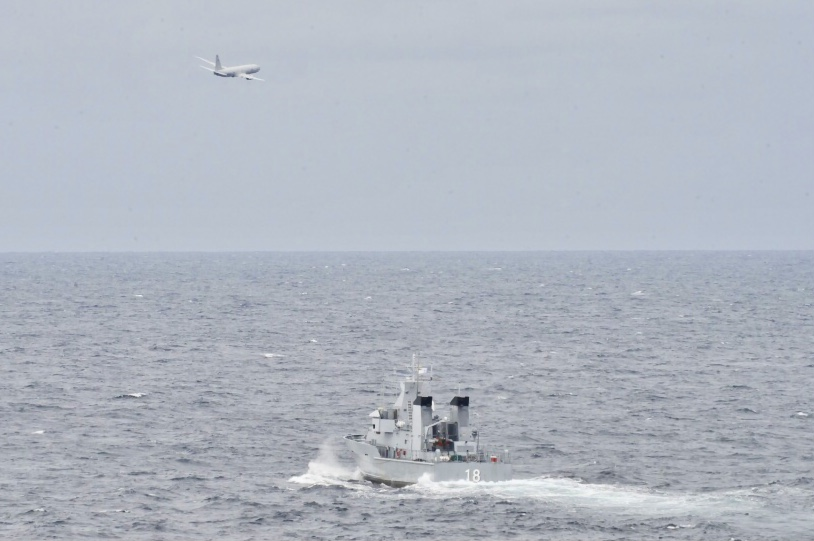
- KDB Berkat underway during CARAT 2018

History

Brunei
- Name: Berkat (Blessings)
- Namesake: Berkat
- Builder: Lürssen Werft
- Launched: 2009
- Commissioned: 15 March 2010
- Home port: Muara, Brunei
- Identification: 18
- Status: Active

General characteristics
- Class & type: Ijtihad-class patrol boat
- Type: FPB 41 fast patrol boat
- Displacement: 262 tons
- Length: 41 m (134 ft 6 in)
- Beam: 7.7 m (25 ft 3 in)
- Draught: 1.9 m (6 ft 3 in)
- Installed power: 6,670 kW (8,940 hp)
- Propulsion: 2 x diesel engines; 2 x propellers
- Speed: 30 knots (56 km/h; 35 mph) maximum
- Complement: 16 (+5 embarked)
- Sensors & processing systems: 1 x navigation radar 1 x MEOS ESM
- Armament: 1 × Rheinmetall MLG 27 mm gun

KDB Berkat (18) is the second ship of the Ijtihad-class patrol boats. The vessel is in active service in the Royal Brunei Navy (RBN).

== Development ==
=== Background ===
A total of four Ijtihad-class fast patrol boats have been commissioned into service with the Royal Brunei Navy (RBN), where two of the ships began operating since March 2010 followed by another two on 28 August 2010.

Two Ijtihad-class fast patrol boats arrived in Brunei Darussalam on 27 August 2010. The boats, given the prefix Kapal Diraja Brunei (KDB) and named Syafaat and Afiat were commissioned at the RBN Base in Muara, Brunei. They are part of the project between Brunei and Lürssen Werft.

The commissioning ceremony of both vessels was officiated by Major General Dato Paduka Seri Haji Aminuddin Ihsan bin Pehin Orang Kaya Saiful Mulok Dato Seri Paduka Haji Abidin, Commander of the Royal Brunei Armed Forces (RBAF). Like previous fast patrol boats, Syafaat and Afiat were produced in Germany and completed sea trials. KDB Ijtihad and Berkat began operations on 15 March 2010.

== Construction and career ==
Berkat was built by Lürssen Werft company in Germany around 2009. She is part of the first batch delivered from Germany to Brunei. Ijtihad and Berkat commissioned together on 15 March 2010 at Muara Naval Base. All four of her sister ships work in the patrol craft role.

=== Trans Future 2 collision ===
On 23 February 2014, the car carrier Trans Future 2 collided with Berkat near Muara Naval Base.

=== CARAT 2018 ===
KDB Darulaman, Berkat, and the American USNS Fall River and USS Emory S. Land conducted "Cooperation Afloat Readiness and Training" (CARAT) to strengthen the relations between Brunei Darussalam and the United States. It took place in the South China Sea on 15 November 2018.

=== Exercise PENGUIN 2018 ===
Exercise Penguin was held between Royal Australian Navy and Royal Brunei Navy on 18 to 22 October 2018 by Berkat, Darulaman and HMAS Launceston.

An exercise was conducted by the Royal Navy's HMS Montrose and Berkat on 26 March 2019 in Brunei waters.

14 April 2020, Berkat responded to a report of four missing fishermen but they were later found safe on that day.
