= Ijtihad-class patrol boat =

2010 Brunei navy ship class

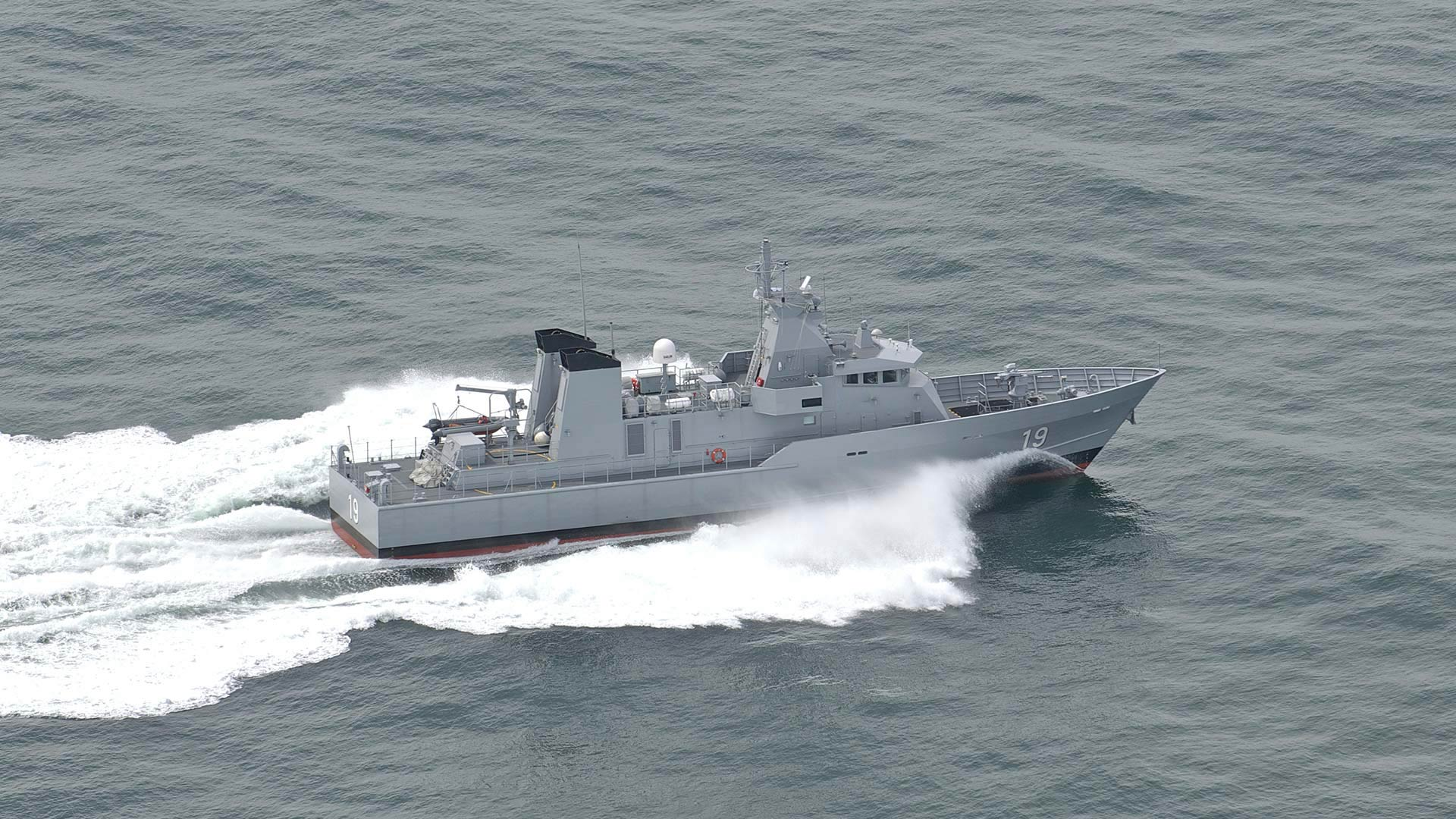
- KDB Syafaat (FPB-19) underway in Germany.

Class overview
- Name: Ijtihad class
- Builders: Lürssen Werft
- Operators: Royal Brunei Navy
- Preceded by: Waspada class
- In commission: 2010–present
- Planned: 4
- Completed: 4
- Active: 4

General characteristics
- Type: FPB 41 fast patrol boat
- Displacement: 262 tonnes (289 tons)
- Length: 41 metres (134 feet 6 inches)
- Beam: 7.7 metres (25 feet 3 inches)
- Draught: 1.9 metres (6 feet 3 inches)
- Installed power: 6,670 kW (8,945 shp)
- Propulsion: 2x diesel engines; 2x FPP propellers
- Speed: 30 knots (56 km/h; 35 mph) maximum
- Complement: 16 (+5 embarked)
- Sensors & processing systems: 1× navigation radar; 1× MEOS ESM
- Armament: 1× Rheinmetall MLG 27mm gun; 2× 7.62 mm machine gun

The Ijtihad class consists of four fast patrol boats built by Lürssen Werft in Germany, and delivered to Brunei Darussalam in 2009. They patrol the coast of Brunei, and sometimes participate in joint naval exercises. The lead ship in the class is KDB Ijtihad (17).

== Development ==
=== Background ===
A total of four Ijtihad-class fast patrol boats have been commissioned into service with the Royal Brunei Navy (RBN; Malay: Tentera Laut Diraja Brunei, TLDB), where two of the ships began operating since March 2010, followed by another two on 28 August 2010.

Two Ijtihad-class fast patrol boats arrived in Brunei Darussalam on 27 August 2010. The boats, named Kapal Diraja Brunei (KDB) Syafaat and KDB Afiat were commissioned at the Muara Naval Base. They are part of the project between the government of His Majesty The Sultan and Yang Di-Pertuan of Negara Brunei Darussalam and Lürssen Werft.

The commissioning ceremony of both vessels was officiated by Major General Dato Paduka Seri Haji Aminuddin Ihsan bin Pehin Orang Kaya Saiful Mulok Dato Seri Paduka Haji Abidin, Commander of the Royal Brunei Armed Forces (RBAF; Angkatan Bersenjata Diraja Brunei, ABDB). Like previous fast patrol boats, KDB Syafaat and KDB Afiat were produced in Germany and completed sea trials. KDB Ijtihad and KDB Berkat began operations on 15 March 2010.

== Ships in class ==
pennant no.	name	MMSI	call sign	builder	launched	commissioned	status
17	KDB Ijtihad	508111118	V8DA	Lurssen Werft, Bremen-Vegesack	2009	March 2010	commissioned
18	KDB Berkat	508111119	V8DB	Lurssen Werft, Bremen-Vegesack	2009	March 2010	commissioned
19	KDB Syafaat	508111120	V8DC	Lurssen Werft, Bremen-Vegesack	2009	August 2010	commissioned
20	KDB Afiat	508111121	V8DD	Lurssen Werft, Bremen-Vegesack	2009	August 2010	commissioned
