= Muara Naval Base =

Naval base and headquarters of the Royal Brunei Navy

- Pangkalan Tentera Laut Muara ڤڠكالن تنترا لاوت موارا
- Muara, Serasa, Brunei-Muara in Brunei
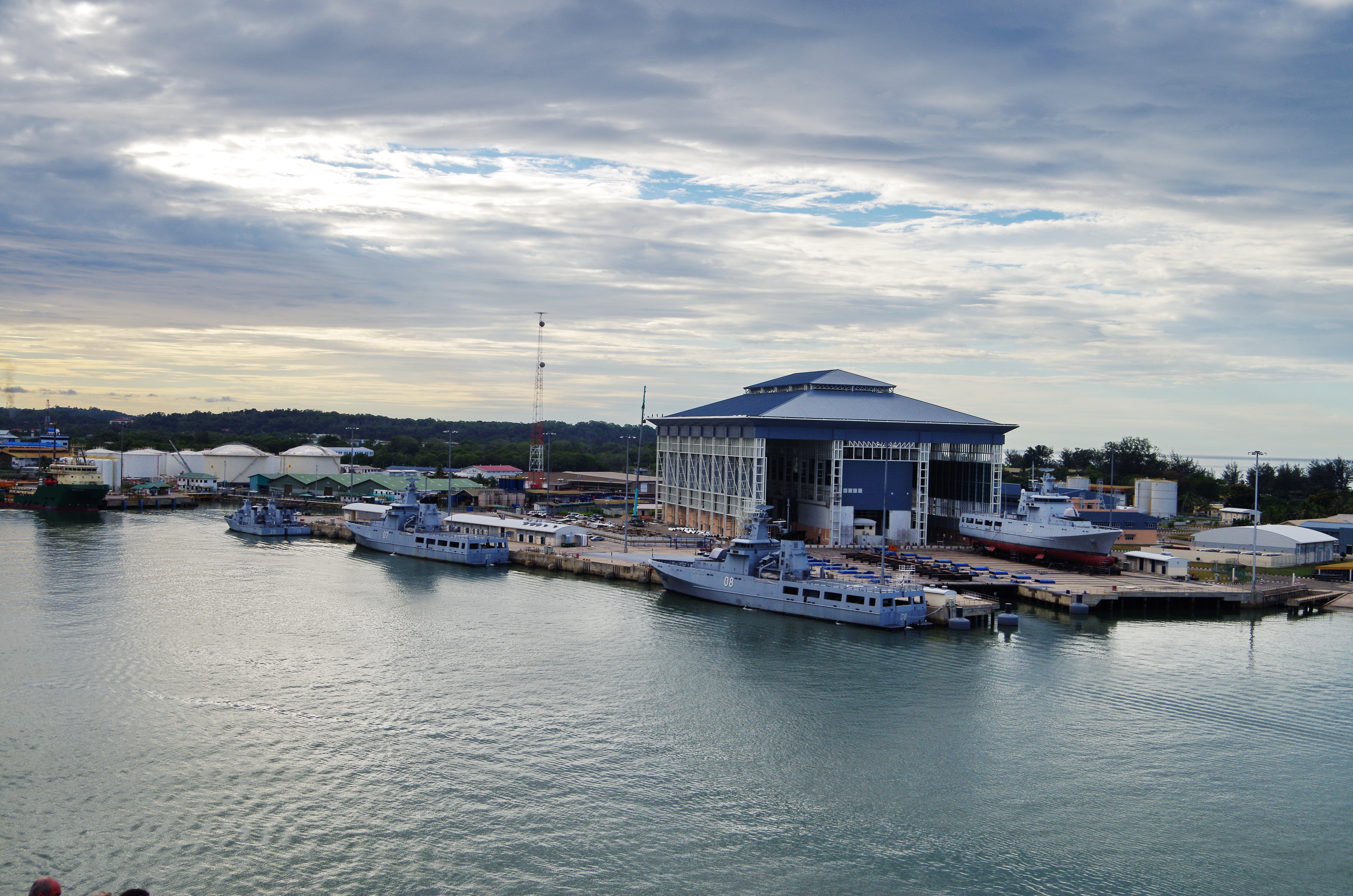
- Muara Naval Base in 2013

Site information
- Type: Naval base and headquarters
- Owner: Government of Brunei
- Operator: Royal Brunei Navy
- Controlled by: Ministry of Defence
- Condition: Operational
- Website: navy.mindef.gov.bn

Location
- Location within Brunei
- Coordinates: 05°01′56″N 115°04′54″E

Site history
- Built: 1974; 52 years ago
- In use: 1974–present

Garrison information
- Current commander: Capt Mohamad Sarif Pudin (acting)
- Garrison: Fleet of the Royal Brunei Navy

Muara Naval Base (Malay: Pangkalan Tentera Laut Muara) is a naval base which serves as the headquarters and main operating base for the Royal Brunei Navy (RBN; Tentera Laut Diraja Brunei, TLDB). It is situated approximately 4 kilometres (2 miles) from Muara Town, Brunei-Muara District, in the sultanate of Brunei Darussalam. The naval base is located near the mouth of the Brunei River, which flows into the Brunei Bay.

== History ==
During World War II, then occupied Muara was previously used by the Japanese Navy as a naval base until the country was liberated by the Australian 9th Division. The Boat Section of the Royal Brunei Malay Regiment (RBMR), specifically, the administration of First Sea Battalion, was relocated to its current location at Muara in 1974. Among many international visitors to the naval base, the United States Navy (USN) warship USS Robert E. Peary (FF-1073) was berthed at Muara Naval Base in 1989. In 1991, Brunei ordered three Nakhoda Ragam-class corvettes, which were planned to be based at the naval base. However, due to a contractual dispute with their manufacturer, all three ships of the class were never commissioned into the navy.

In 1997, the base's upgrade project costed B$140 million, in which it included the construction of a new 314 metres (1,030 feet) long quay, shiplift, and renovation of its existing facilities. The project was carried out in order to facilitate the three new Darussalam-class offshore patrol vessel. Between 2007 and 2012, ammunition and explosive storage bunkers were constructed not far from the base, at Kampong Kapok.

Another B$44.6 million project was started in July 2011, to provide new accommodation facilities for the base's personnel, workshops, technical buildings, and car parks. During BRIDEX 2011, the Royal Brunei Navy celebrated its 46th anniversary at the naval base (and jointly at the BRIDEX International Conference Centre), in which twenty-four warships from ten countries were invited to attend.

On 29 May 2013, as part of a state visit to Brunei, President of Singapore Tony Tan visited the Muara Naval Base. On 23 February 2014, a 172 metres (564 feet) long roll-on/roll-off (ro-ro) car carrier Trans Future 2 collided with KDB Berkat and another Ijtihad-class patrol boat while in port. Later in May, Sultan Hassanal Bolkiah landed his Sikorsky S-70 at the naval base in which he visited the KDB Afiat and witnessed a naval exercise. Later that year on 11 November, the 20th annual Cooperation Afloat Readiness and Training (CARAT Brunei 2014) between the United States and Brunei began at the naval base.

On 12 November 2018, the 24th annual CARAT began at the naval base, in which it involved several exercises in the South China Sea with USNS Fall River (T-EPF-4). The 25th annual CARAT was once again held at the naval base on 31 October 2019.

== Units ==
Three naval divisions are based in the naval base:

- Operation Division
- Administrative Division
- Support Division

== Facilities ==
There are several facilities located within the naval base:

- Royal Brunei Navy Primary School
- Royal Brunei Navy Mosque
- Multi National Coordination Centre (MNCC)
- Naval Training Centre (NTC)
- Training Administration Office
- War Training Room
- Fire–Fighting Training Room
- Learning Management Centre (LMC), operated by the Royal Brunei Training Services (RBTS)
- Multi–Purpose Hall
- Vanguard Logistic Store
- Surau Al-Huda

== See also ==
- Bolkiah Garrison — main base and headquarters of the Royal Brunei Land Force (RBLF)
- Royal Brunei Air Force Base, Rimba — main base and headquarters of the Royal Brunei Air Force (RBAirF)
