= RSS Vigilance =

Victory-class corvette of Singapore Navy

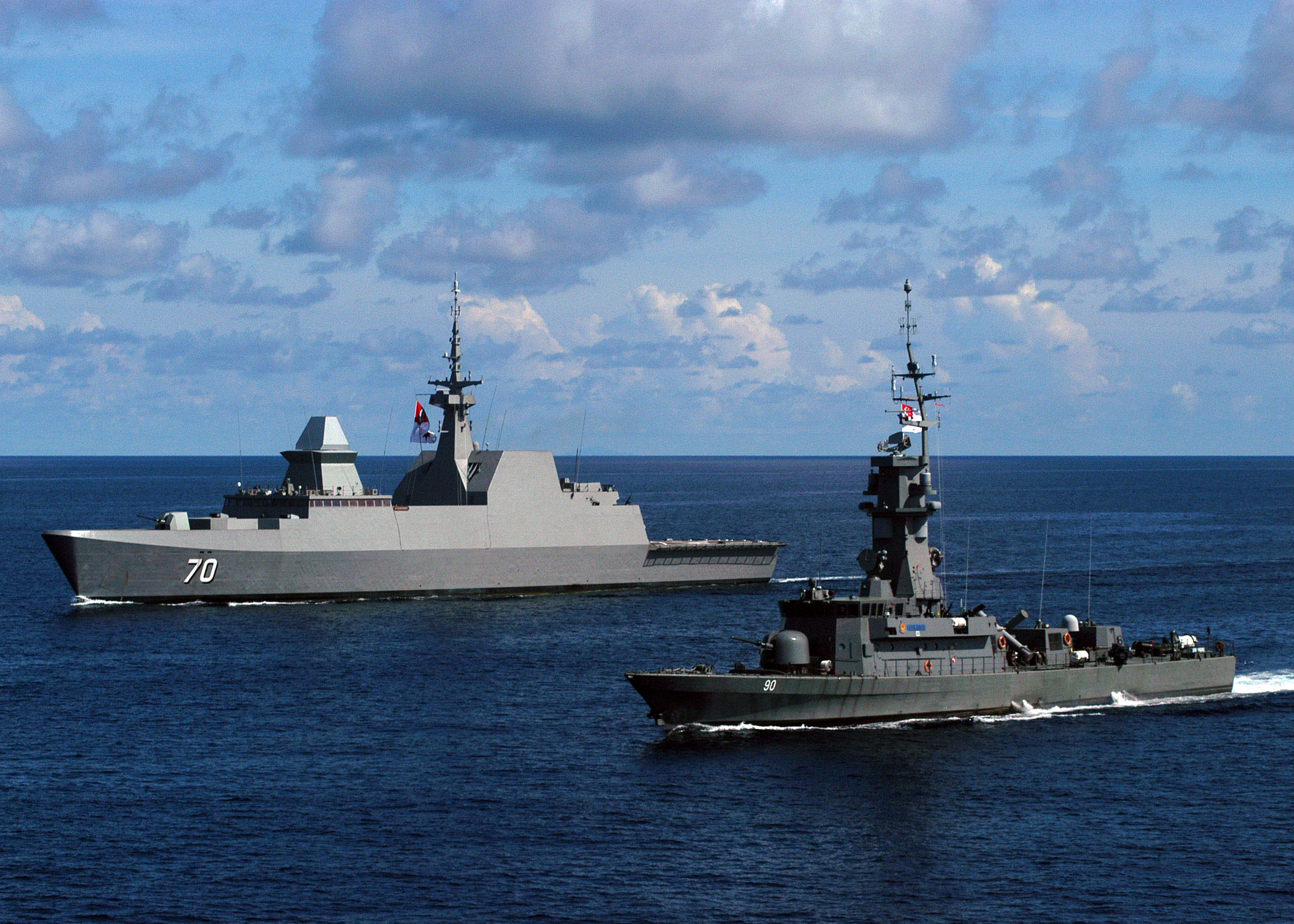
- RSS Vigilance and RSS Steadfast during CARAT 2010

History

Singapore
- Name: Vigilance
- Namesake: Vigilance
- Builder: ST Engineering
- Launched: 27 April 1989
- Commissioned: 18 August 1990
- Home port: Tuas
- Identification: MMSI number: 566010900; Callsign: S6KR; Pennant number: 90
- Motto: Nothing Gets By
- Status: Active

General characteristics
- Class & type: Victory-class corvette
- Displacement: 595 t (586 long tons; 656 short tons)
- Length: 62 m (203 ft 5 in)
- Beam: 8.5 m (27 ft 11 in)
- Draught: 2.6 m (8 ft 6 in)
- Propulsion: 4× Maybach MTU 16 V 538 TB93 high speed diesels coupled to 4× shafts; Total output: 16,900 hp (12,600 kW)
- Speed: Maximum: 37 knots (69 km/h; 43 mph); Cruising: 18 knots (33 km/h; 21 mph)
- Range: 4,000 nmi (7,400 km) at 18 knots (33 km/h; 21 mph)
- Complement: 49 with 8 officers
- Sensors & processing systems: Search radar: Ericsson/Radamec Sea Giraffe 150HC (G/H band) / Saab Sea Giraffe AMB post-2011 SLEP; Navigation radar: Kelvin Hughes 1007 (I band); Weapon control: Elbit MSIS optronic director; Sonar: Thomson Sintra TSM 2064 VDS
- Electronic warfare & decoys: ESM: Elisra SEWS; ECM: RAFAEL RAN 1101 Jammer; Decoys: 2× Plessey Shield 9-barrelled chaff launchers, 2× twin RAFAEL long range chaff launchers fitted below the bridge wings
- Armament: Anti-ship: 4 × Boeing Harpoon; Anti-air: 2 × 8-cell VLS for IAI/RAFAEL Barak; Anti-submarine: EuroTorp A244/S Mod 1 torpedoes launched from 2 × triple-tubes(all removed); Main gun: 1 × Oto Melara 76mm Super Rapid gun; Machine guns: 4 × STK 50MG 12.7 mm (0.50 in) HMGs
- Aircraft carried: 1× Boeing ScanEagle unmanned aerial vehicle (UAV)

RSS Vigilance (90) is the third ship of the Victory-class corvette of the Republic of Singapore Navy.

== Construction and career ==
Vigilance was launched on 27 April 1989 by ST Engineering and was commissioned on 18 August 1990.

=== CARAT 2010 ===
RSS Vigilance, RSS Steadfast, RSS Persistence, MV Avatar, USNS Amelia Earhart, USS Russell, USS Chung-Hoon and USCGC Mellon participated in CARAT 2010.

=== SIMBEX 2025 ===
The ship represented the Singapore Navy alongside RSS Supreme and MV Mentor while the Indian Navy was represented by INS Satpura. This was the 32nd edition of the naval exercise — SIMBEX — and was hosted by Singapore between 28 July and 1 August 2025. The Republic of Singapore Air Force also participated in the exercise with an S-70B Seahawk naval helicopter, two Fokker-50 maritime patrol aircraft and two F-15SG fighter aircraft. The harbour phase was held at RSS Singapura base and was followed by a sea phase held in the southern parts of South China Sea. During the sea phase, the participating forces carried out advanced warfare drills, including gunnery firings, air defence exercises, and maritime security operations. The sea phase concluded with a ceremonial sail-past by the participating ships.

== Gallery ==
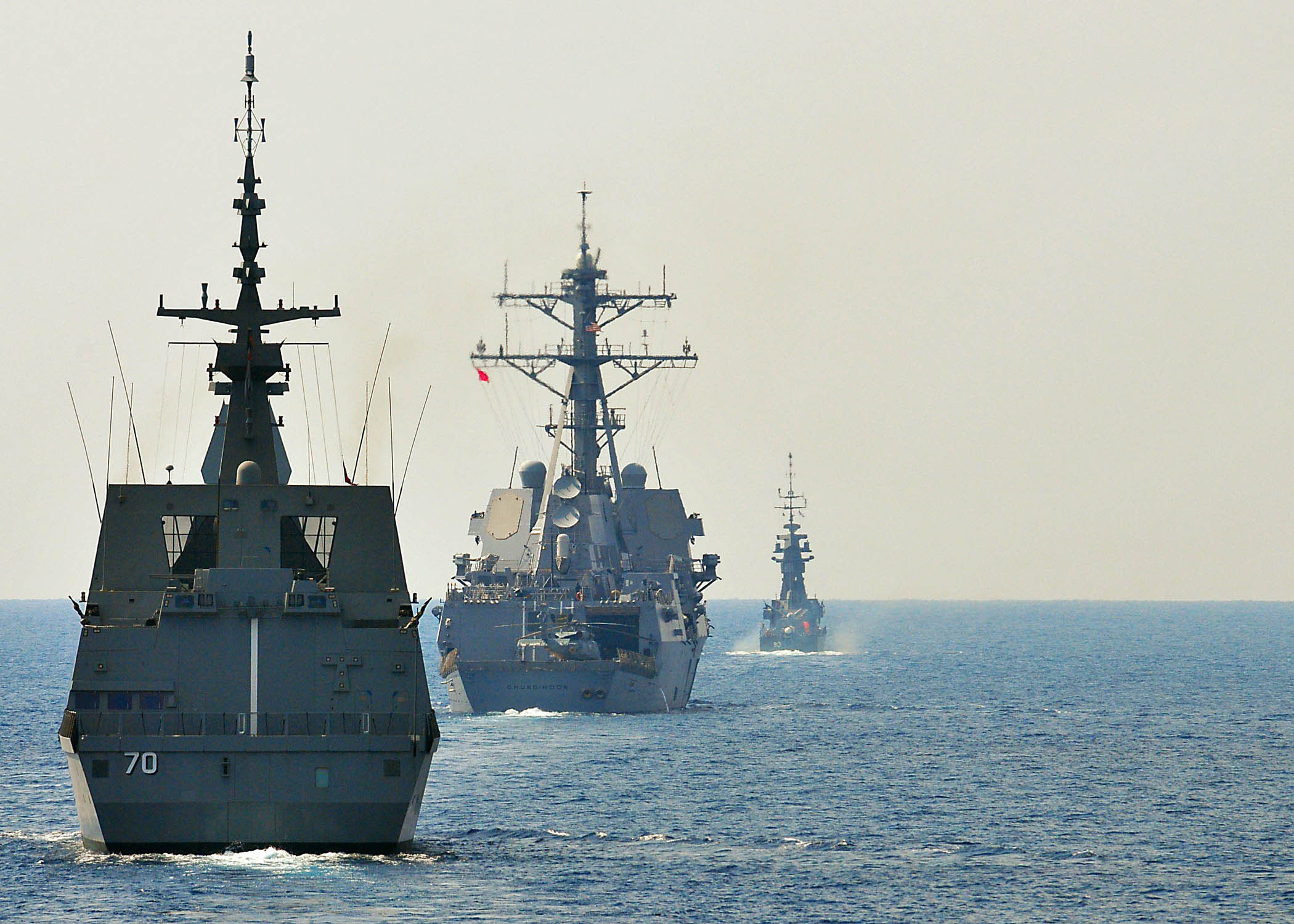
RSS Valour, USS Chung-Hoon and RSS Stalwart during CARAT 2010
