= SIMBEX =

Maritime bilateral exercise

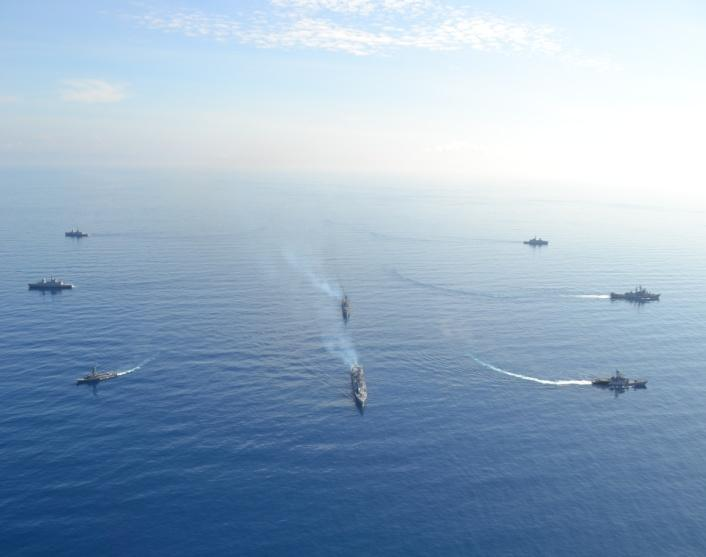
Ships in formation during Simbex 2011

Singapore India Maritime Bilateral Exercise (SIMBEX) is an annual bilateral naval exercise conducted by the Indian Navy and the Republic of Singapore Navy (RSN) previously known as Exercise Lion King.

== History ==
The exercise has been held annually since 1994.

Over the years, SIMBEX has progressed beyond its original emphasis on anti-submarine warfare to include elements of maritime security, anti-air, and anti-surface warfare. Harbour phases include various planning conferences and simulator-based warfare training/ wargaming. In a statement, the Indian High Commission in Singapore in 2019 stated that "SIMBEX is the longest uninterrupted naval exercise that India has with any other country".

Simbex-2019 took place on the South China Sea and included maritime combat exercises such as firing exercises, tracking exercises, and coordinated tactical exercises.

=== 2020–present ===
The 28th edition of SIMBEX took place from 2 to 4 September 2021 in the southern fringes of the South China Sea. The Indian Navy was represented by destroyer INS Ranvijay with a ship borne helicopter, corvettes INS Kiltan and INS Kora and one P8I Long Range Maritime Patrol Aircraft. The RSN was represented by Formidable Class Frigate, RSS Steadfast, embarked with an S-70B naval helicopter, one Victory Class Missile Corvette, RSS Vigour, one Archer Class Submarine and one Fokker-50 Maritime Patrol Aircraft. Four F-16 fighter aircraft of the Republic of Singapore Air Force (RSAF) also participated in the exercise during the Air Defence Drills.

The 31st edition of SIMBEX took place from 23 to 29 October 2024 in two phases. Phase 1 was conducted at Vishakapatnam as harbor phase while Phase 2 was conducted in Bay of Bengal region. The Indian Navy was represented by INS Shivalik and their Eastern Fleet. The Republic of Singapore Navy will attend with RSS Tenacious.

The 32nd edition of SIMBEX was hosted by Singapore from 28 July to 1 August 2025. The harbour phase was held at RSS Singapura and was followed by the sea phase held in the southern parts of South China Sea. While the Indian Navy was represented by INS Satpura, the Republic of Singapore Navy was represented by RSS Supreme and RSS Vigilance, supported by MV Mentor. The Republic of Singapore Air Force also participated in the exercise with an S-70B Seahawk naval helicopter, two Fokker-50 maritime patrol aircraft and two F-15SG fighter aircraft. The harbour phase was held at RSS Singapura base and was followed by the sea phase held in the southern parts of South China Sea. During the sea phase, the participating forces carried out advanced warfare drills, including gunnery firings, air defence exercises, and maritime security operations. The sea phase concluded with a ceremonial sail-past by the participating ships.

The 33rd edition of SIMBEX was hosted by India from 21 to 26 October 2026. The harbour phase was held at Visakhapatnam until 23 October followed by the sea phase from 24 October in the Bay of Bengal. The exercise included the participation of INS Nilgiri, INS Kamorta and RSS Supreme. The air assets deployed in the exercise included an SH-70B helicopter with Supreme along with P-8I Neptune, Do-228 MPA, Hawk 132 and MH-60R helicopters of the Indian Naval Air Arm.
