= RSS Stalwart =

Formidable-class stealth frigate

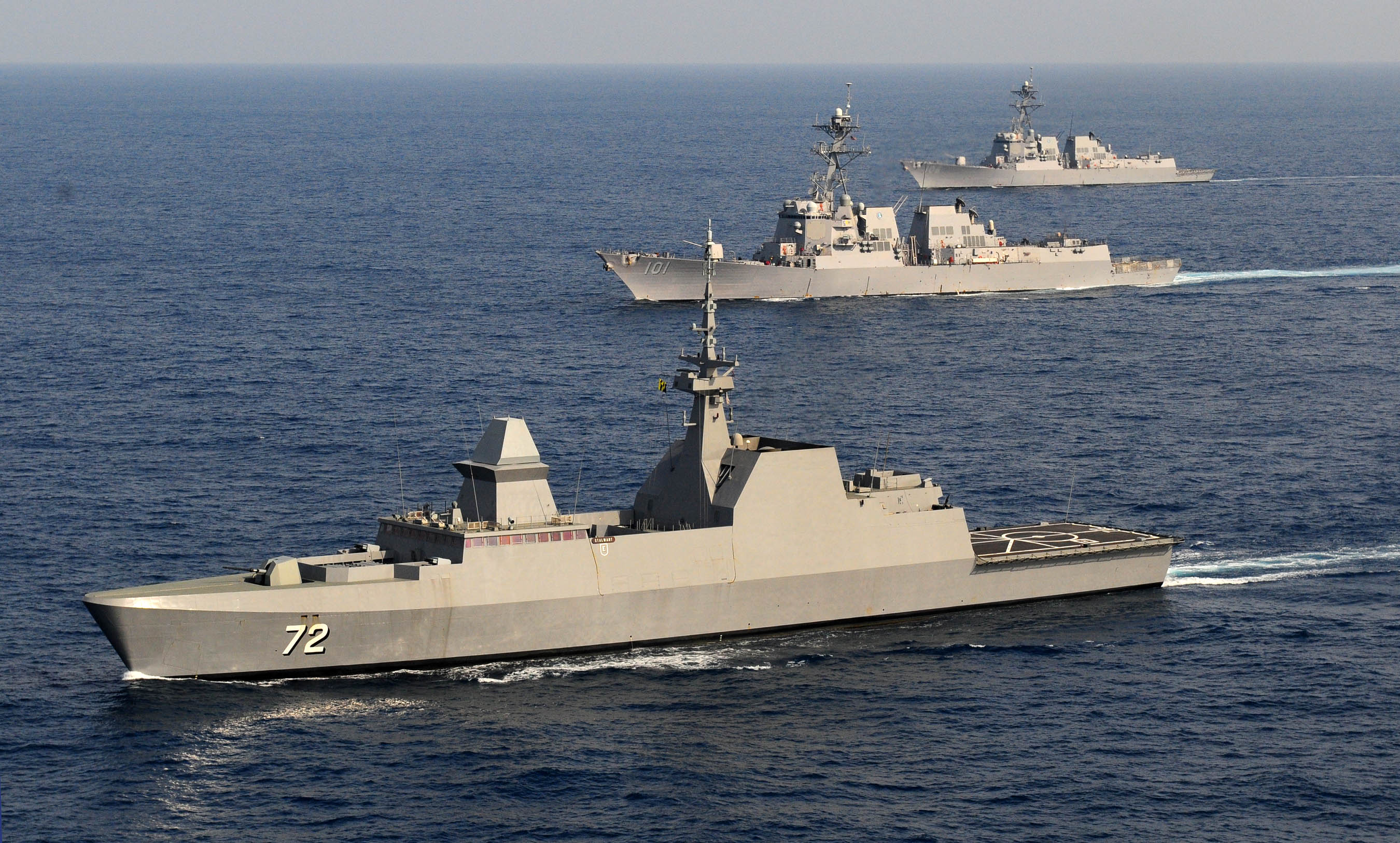
- RSS Stalwart, USS Gridley and USS Stockdale on 20 January 2011

History

Singapore
- Name: Stalwart
- Namesake: Stalwart
- Ordered: March 2000
- Builder: ST Engineering
- Launched: 9 December 2005
- Commissioned: 16 January 2009
- Home port: Changi Naval Base
- Identification: MMSI number: 566011800; Callsign: S6KM; Pennant number: 72
- Motto: Determined to Win
- Status: Active

General characteristics
- Class & type: Formidable-class frigate
- Displacement: 3,200 tonnes (3,100 long tons; 3,500 short tons)
- Length: 114.8 m (376 ft 8 in)
- Beam: 16.3 m (53 ft 6 in)
- Draught: 6.0 m (19 ft 8 in)
- Installed power: 4 × ISM V1708 diesel generators, each producing 860 kilowatts (1,150 shp); Total output: 3,440 kW (4,610 shp)
- Propulsion: Combined diesel and diesel (CODAD) arrangement; 4 × MTU 20V 8000 M90, each rated at 9,100 kW (12,200 shp); Total output: 36,400 kW (48,800 shp)
- Speed: Maximum: 27 knots (50 km/h; 31 mph); Cruising: 18 kn (33 km/h; 21 mph)
- Range: 4,200 nautical miles (7,800 km)
- Complement: 71, excluding air crew detachment of approx. 19
- Sensors & processing systems: Search radar: Thales Herakles multi-function passive electronically scanned array radar; Navigation radar: Terma Electronic Scanter 2001; Sonar: EDO Model 980 active low frequency towed sonar (ALOFTS)
- Electronic warfare & decoys: ESM: RAFAEL C-PEARL-M; Decoys: Sagem Défense Sécurité New Generation Dagaie System, 2 × forward & 1 × aft; Leonardo Finmeccanica Morpheus anti-torpedo suite with WASS C310 launchers, 2 x aft
- Armament: Anti-ship: 8 (Up to 24) × RGM-84C Harpoon SSMs, to be replaced by Blue Spear SSM; Anti-air: 16-cell Sylver A50 VLS for MBDA Aster 15/30, 16-cell Sylver A43 VLS for MBDA Aster 15; Anti-submarine: 2 × B515 triple tubes with reloads for EuroTorp A244/S Mod 3 torpedoes; Guns: 1x OTO Melara 76mm Super Rapid gun; 4 × STK 50MG 12.7 mm (0.50 in) HMG; 2 × 25mm Mk 38 Mod2 Typhoon Weapon Station Stabilised Gun; Non-lethal: Long-Range Acoustic Device 500 Xtreme (LRAD500X)
- Aircraft carried: 1× S-70B Seahawk multi-mission capable naval helicopter
- Aviation facilities: Flight deck and enclosed hangar for up to two medium-lift helicopters

RSS Stalwart (72) is the fifth ship of the Formidable-class stealth frigate of the Republic of Singapore Navy.

== Construction and career ==
RSS Stalwart was built by ST Marine Engineering company in Singapore in the late 2000s. Stalwart was commissioned on 16 January 2009.

=== Exercise Malabar 2007 ===
RSS Formidable participated in Exercise Malabar 07–2 in September 2007, a Theatre Security Cooperation engagement involving the navies of the United States, India, Australia, Japan and Singapore. The exercise involved more than 20,000 personnel on 28 ships and 150 aircraft, including the USS Kitty Hawk Carrier Strike Group.

On 16 November 2009, RSS Stalwart was deployed to southern California to support ship / air integration activities. The Republic of Singapore Air Force established its Peace Triton Sikorsky S-70B Seahawk Naval Helicopter detachment at the USN Maritime Strike Weapons School in San Diego, California to undertake qualification and operational training under the umbrella of the USN's SH-60F Aircraft Qualification Course.

=== Exercise Pelican 2011 ===
Singapore and Brunei concluded their flagship bilateral naval exercise from 10 to 13 July 2011 which consists of RSS Stalwart, KDB Darulehsan, KDB Syafaat and KDB Itjihad.

=== CARAT 2011 ===
RSS Vigour, RSS Stalwart and RSS Supreme conducted a joint exercise with USS Chung-Hoon on 23 August 2011.

=== Exercise Pelican 2015 ===
Singapore and Brunei concluded their flagship bilateral naval exercise on 27 November. Exercise Pelican ran from 23 to 27 November 2015, hosted by the Republic of Singapore Navy. The exercise featured RSS Stalwart, RSS Valiant, KDB Darussalam and KDB Darulehsan.

=== PLAN 70th anniversary ===
On 19 April 2019, RSS Stalwart arrived at Qingdao, China for a multinational naval event.

=== ADMM-Plus 2019 ===
RSS Stalwart, KDB Daruttaqwa, HMAS Success, PLAN Xiangtan, INS Kolkata, INS Shakti, KRI Halasan, KRI Tombak, JS Murasame, JS Izumo, KD Lekiu, BRP Andrés Bonifacio, MV Avatar, ROKS Cheonjabong, ROKS Jeonbuk, ROKS Wang Geon, HTMS Bhumibol Adulyadej, USS William P. Lawrence and VPNS Quang Trung conducted ADMM-PLUS 2019 off Busan, South Korea. The ships have to conduct an exercise where they need to retake hostile vessels and rescue people overboard at sea. All ships returned to Singapore to conduct check aboard cargo ships.

== Gallery ==
RSS Stalwart Gallery

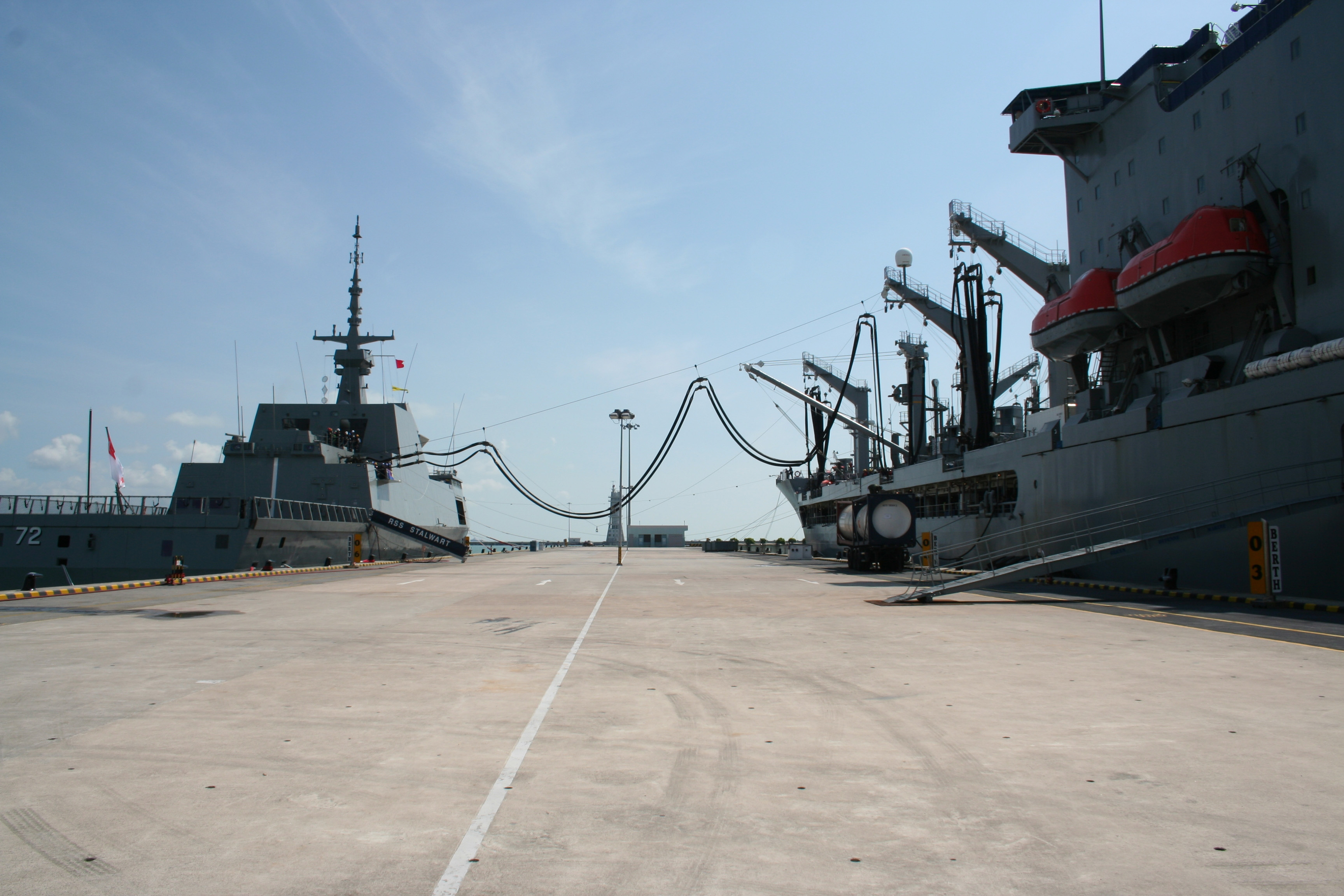
USNS John Ericsson attaches to RSS Stalwart at Changi Naval Base, 10 January 2008.

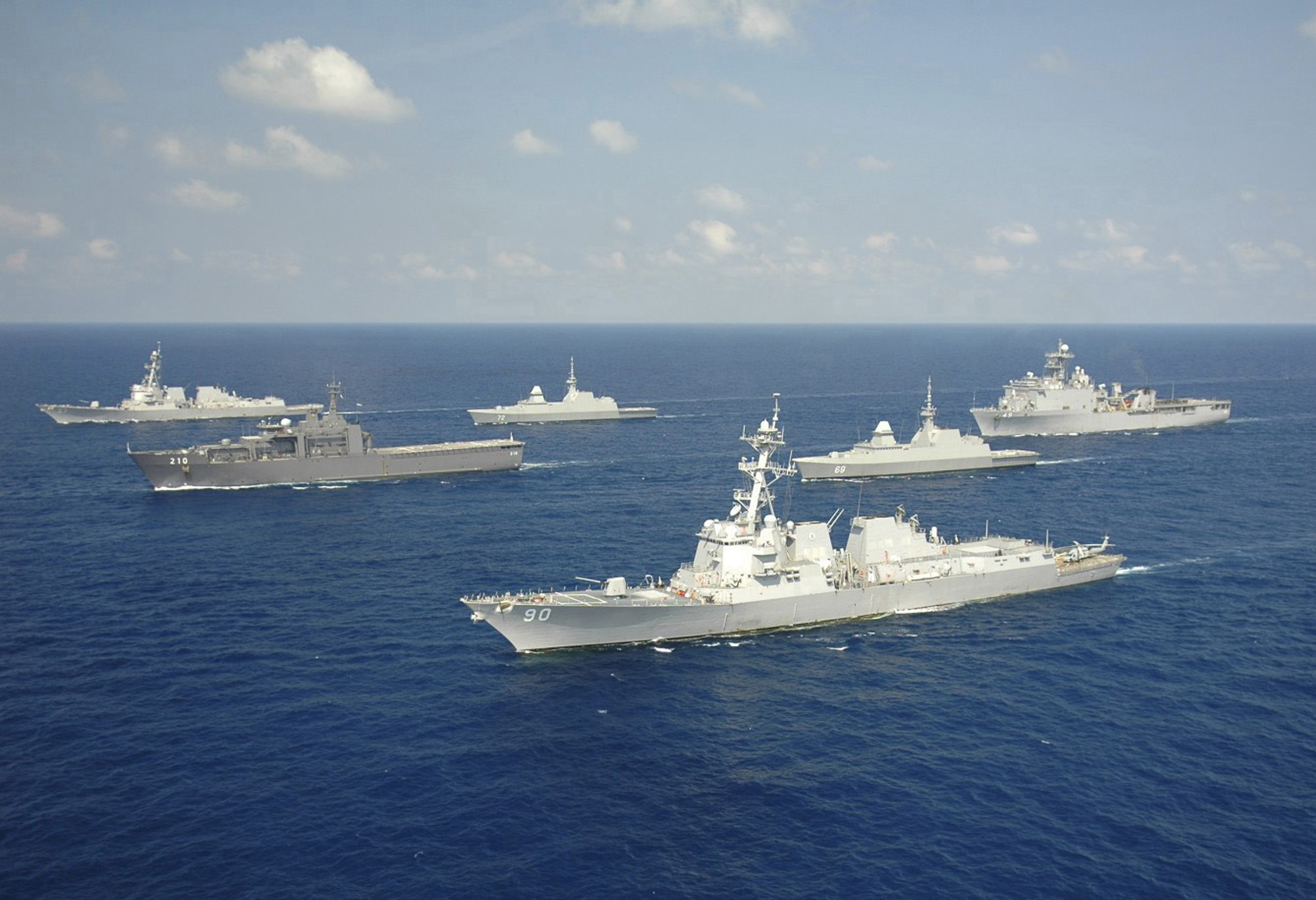
RSS Stalwart, RSS Intrepid and RSS Endeavour manoeuvre in formation with USS Harpers Ferry, USS Chafee and USS Chung-Hoon during Cooperation Afloat Readiness and Training (CARAT) 2009.

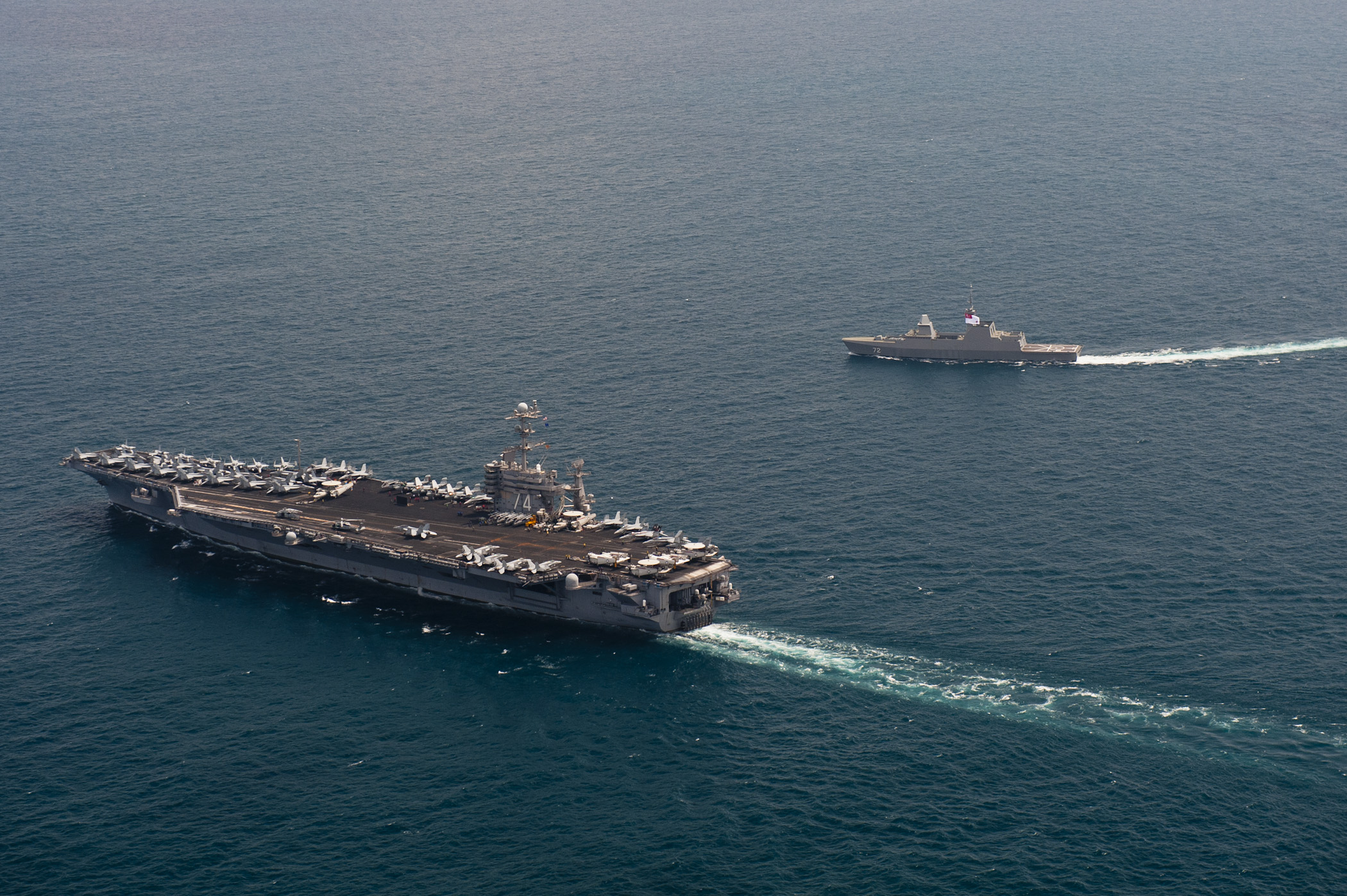
USS John C. Stennis and RSS Stalwart underway on 30 January 2012.

RSS Stalwart leaving the port of Wellington, New Zealand on 11 October 2012.
