= RSS Supreme =

Singapore Navy frigate

- RSS Supreme arrives at Pearl Harbor during RIMPAC 2010.

History

Singapore
- Name: Supreme
- Namesake: Supreme
- Ordered: March 2000
- Builder: ST Engineering
- Launched: 9 May 2006
- Commissioned: 16 January 2009
- Home port: Changi
- Identification: MMSI number: 552574101; Callsign: S6KN; Pennant number: 73
- Motto: Surpassing All Always
- Status: Active

General characteristics
- Class & type: Formidable-class frigate
- Displacement: 3,200 tonnes (3,100 long tons; 3,500 short tons)
- Length: 114.8 m (376 ft 8 in)
- Beam: 16.3 m (53 ft 6 in)
- Draught: 6.0 m (19 ft 8 in)
- Installed power: 4 × ISM V1708 diesel generators, each producing 860 kilowatts (1,150 shp); Total output: 3,440 kW (4,610 shp)
- Propulsion: Combined diesel and diesel (CODAD) arrangement; 4 × MTU 20V 8000 M90, each rated at 9,100 kW (12,200 shp); Total output: 36,400 kW (48,800 shp)
- Speed: Maximum: 27 knots (50 km/h; 31 mph); Cruising: 18 kn (33 km/h; 21 mph)
- Range: 4,200 nautical miles (7,800 km)
- Complement: 71, excluding air crew detachment of approx. 19
- Sensors & processing systems: Search radar: Thales Herakles multi-function passive electronically scanned array radar; Navigation radar: Terma Electronic Scanter 2001; Sonar: EDO Model 980 active low frequency towed sonar (ALOFTS)
- Electronic warfare & decoys: ESM: RAFAEL C-PEARL-M; Decoys: Sagem Défense Sécurité New Generation Dagaie System, 2 × forward & 1 × aft; Leonardo Finmeccanica Morpheus anti-torpedo suite with WASS C310 launchers, 2 x aft
- Armament: Anti-ship: 8 (Up to 24) × RGM-84C Harpoon SSMs, to be replaced by Blue Spear SSM; Anti-air: 16-cell Sylver A50 VLS for MBDA Aster 15/30, 16-cell Sylver A43 VLS for MBDA Aster 15; Anti-submarine: 2 × B515 triple tubes with reloads for EuroTorp A244/S Mod 3 torpedoes; Guns: 1x OTO Melara 76mm Super Rapid gun; 4 × STK 50MG 12.7 mm (0.50 in) HMG; 2 × 25mm Mk 38 Mod2 Typhoon Weapon Station Stabilised Gun; Non-lethal: Long-Range Acoustic Device 500 Xtreme (LRAD500X)
- Aircraft carried: 1× S-70B Seahawk multi-mission capable naval helicopter
- Aviation facilities: Flight deck and enclosed hangar for up to two medium-lift helicopters

RSS Supreme (73) is the sixth ship of the Formidable-class stealth frigate of the Republic of Singapore Navy.

== Construction and career ==
RSS Supreme was built by ST Marine Engineering company in Singapore in the late 2000s. Supreme was commissioned on 16 January 2009.

=== RIMPAC 2010 ===
RSS Supreme participated in RIMPAC 2010 from 23 June to 1 August 2010. RSS Supreme fired her Aster 15 Surface-to-Air Missile (SAM) off the coast of Hawaii. Chief of Navy Rear-Admiral Chew Men Leong was on board to observe the live-firing exercises.

=== CARAT 2011 ===
RSS Vigour, RSS Stalwart and RSS Supreme conducted a joint exercise with USS Chung-Hoon on 23 August 2011.

=== Indonesia AirAsia Flight 8501 ===
In December 2014, Supreme was deployed in the search for Airasia Flight QZ8501 after it crashed into the Java Sea on 28 December 2014; along with the RSN ships Persistence, Valour, and Kallang, MV Swift Rescue, and two Lockheed C-130H Hercules.

=== PASSEX 2016 ===
The Republic of Singapore Navy and the Royal Australian Navy conducted a passage exercise which consists of RSS Supreme, HMAS Darwin and HMAS Adelaide. One of HMAS Adelaide's MRH-90 helicopter lands on Supreme's deck.

On 6 April 2018, RSS Supreme and RSS Valiant underwent alongside USS Sampson and USS Theodore Roosevelt off Singapore.

RSS Supreme and USNS Carl Brasher conducted a replenish at sea on 26 June 2020.

=== RIMPAC 2020 ===
RSS Supreme joined HMAS Stuart, HMAS Sirius, USS Rafael Peralta and KDB Darulehsan on their way to Pearl Harbor, Hawaii in preparation for RIMPAC 2020 on 6 August. RIMPAC 2020 is scheduled to start on 17 August.

=== 2024 ===
Following a collision and resulting fire 30 nautical miles northeast of Pedra Branca between product tanker Hafnia Nile and shadow fleet VLCC tanker Ceres I, causing an immediate evacuation of the Hafnia Nile, RSS Supreme was the first to arrive and picked up 16 crewmembers from the Hafnia Nile while six others were rescued from a life raft by another ship and transferred to the Supreme for transport to Singapore.

=== SIMBEX 2025 ===
The ship represented the Singapore Navy alongside RSS Vigilance and MV Mentor while the Indian Navy was represented by INS Satpura. This was the 32nd edition of the naval exercise — SIMBEX — and was hosted by Singapore between 28 July and 1 August 2025. The Republic of Singapore Air Force also participated in the exercise with an S-70B Seahawk naval helicopter, two Fokker-50 maritime patrol aircraft and two F-15SG fighter aircraft. The harbour phase was held at RSS Singapura base and was followed by a sea phase held in the southern parts of South China Sea. During the sea phase, the participating forces carried out advanced warfare drills, including gunnery firings, air defence exercises, and maritime security operations. The sea phase concluded with a ceremonial sail-past by the participating ships.

=== SIMBEX 2026 ===
She was also part of the 33rd edition of SIMBEX, which was hosted by India from 21 to 26 October 2026. The harbour phase was held at Visakhapatnam until 23 October followed by the sea phase from 24 October in the Bay of Bengal. The exercise also included the participation of INS Nilgiri and INS Kamorta from the Indian Navy. The ship participated with an SH-70B helicopter embarked. Further, Indian naval air assets deployed in the exercise included P-8I Neptune, Do-228 MPA, Hawk 132 and MH-60R helicopters.

== Gallery ==
RSS Supreme Gallery

RSS Supreme passes by JS Atago in Pearl Harbor during RIMPAC 2010.

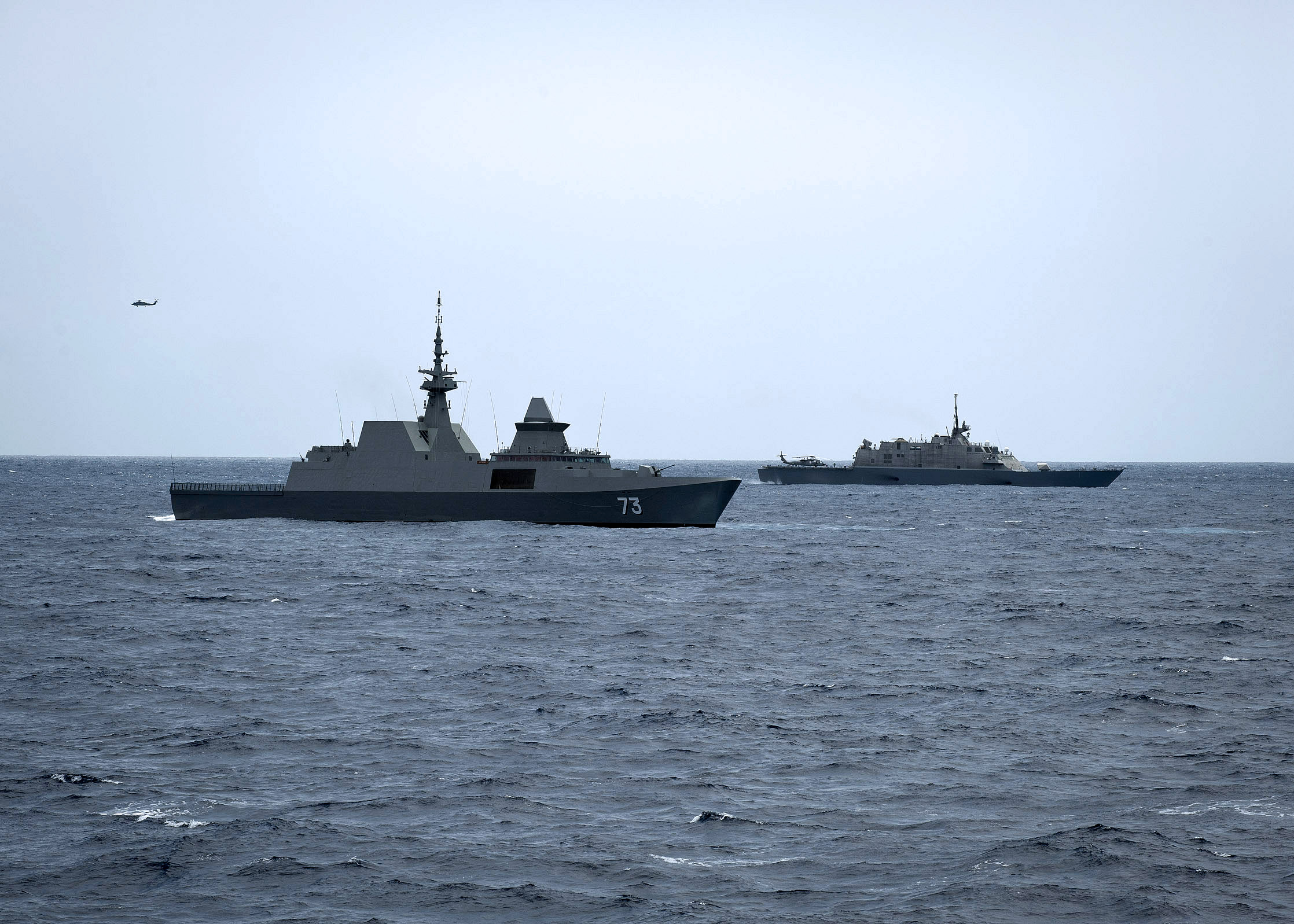
RSS Supreme alongside USS Freedom during RIMPAC 2010.

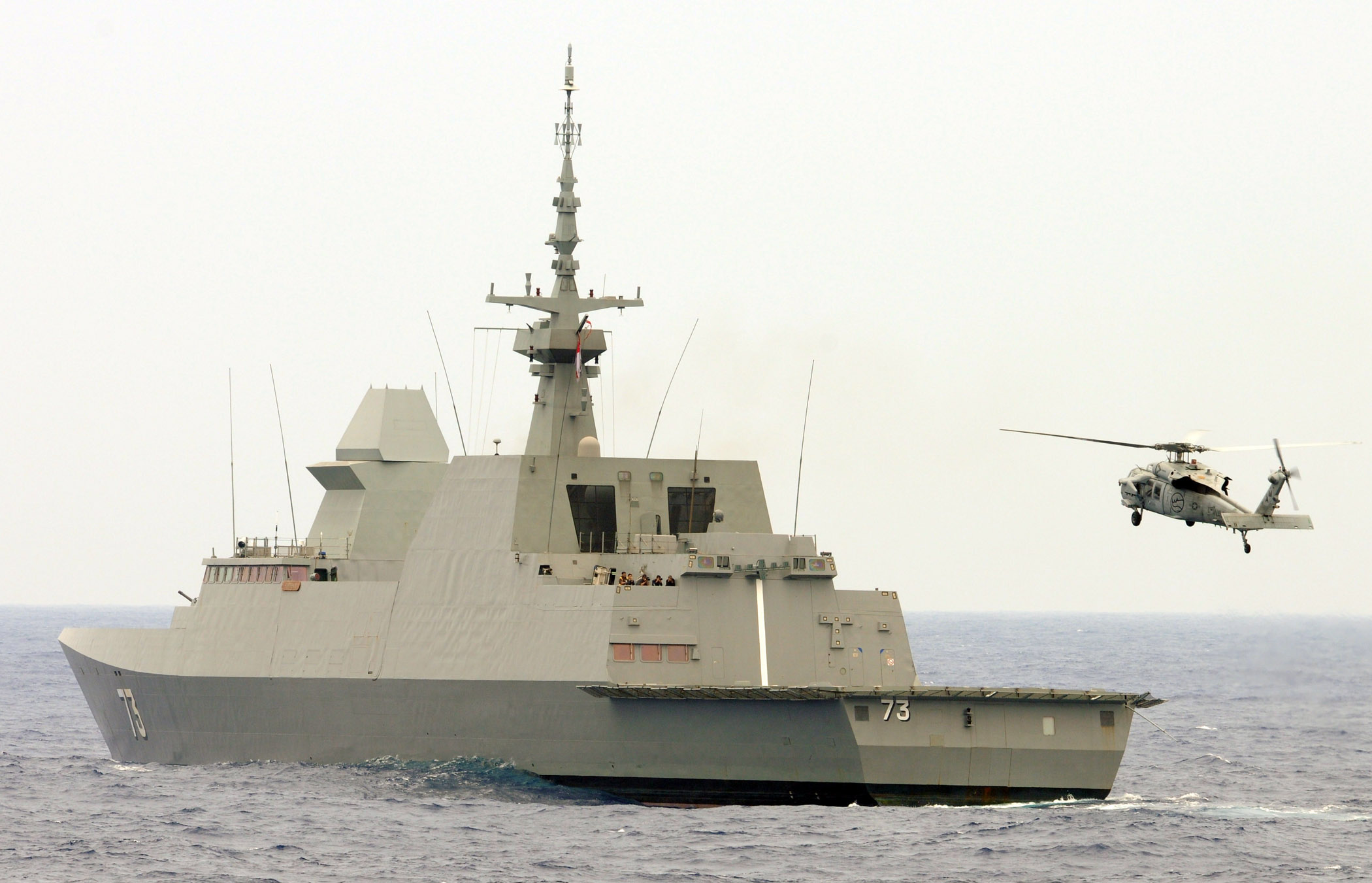
An MH-60S helicopter from USS Freedom approaches RSS Supreme during RIMPAC 2010.

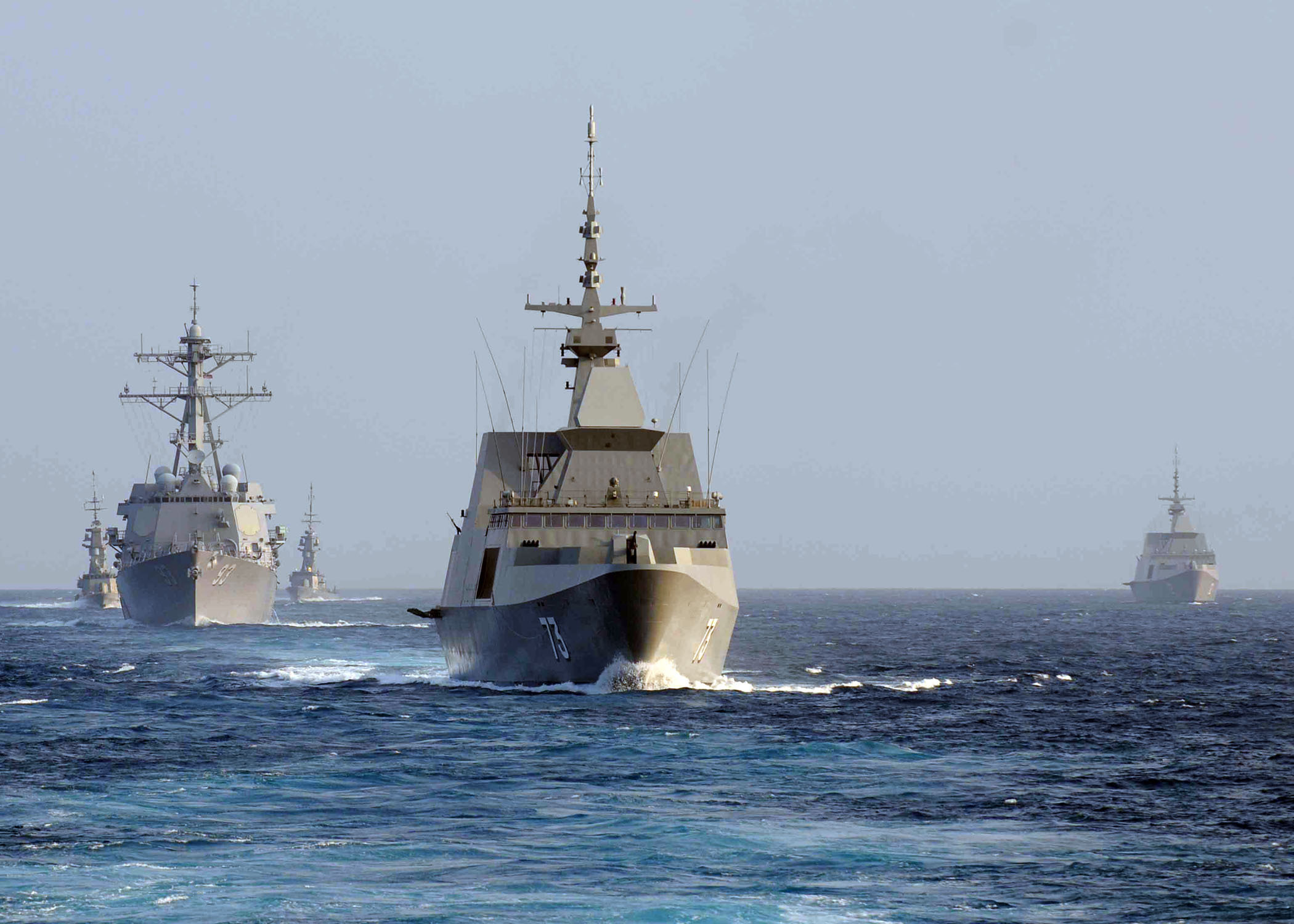
An MH-60S helicopter from USS Freedom approaches RSS Supreme during RIMPAC 2010.
