= RSS Steadfast =

Stealth frigate of the Republic of Singapore Navy

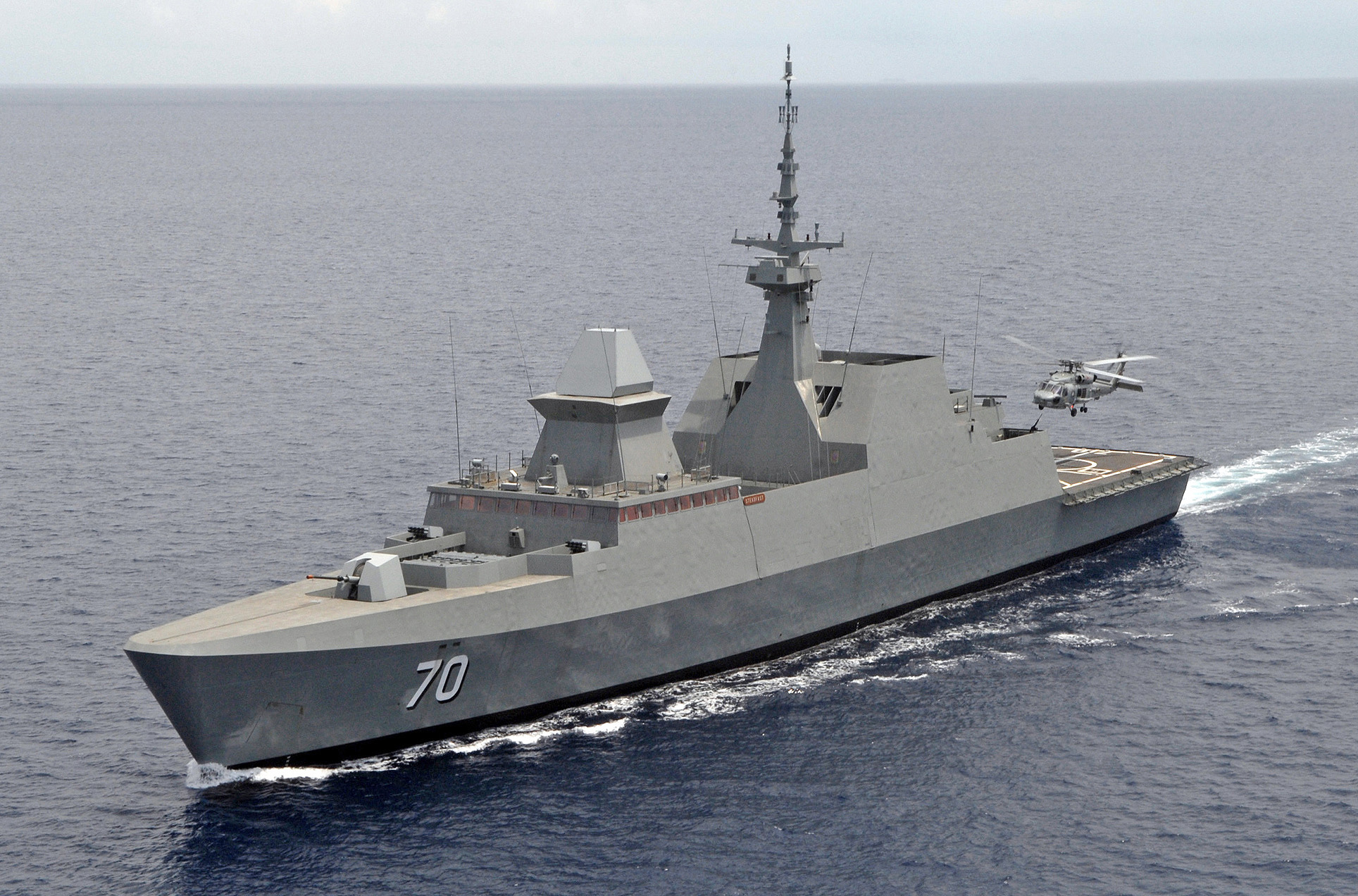
- RSS Steadfast on 15 April 2008

History

Singapore
- Name: Steadfast
- Namesake: Steadfast
- Ordered: March 2000
- Builder: ST Engineering
- Launched: 15 July 2005
- Commissioned: 5 February 2008
- Home port: Changi
- Identification: MMSI number: 563590000; Callsign: S6KK; Pennant number: 70
- Motto: Will Above All
- Status: Active

General characteristics
- Class & type: Formidable-class frigate
- Displacement: 3,200 tonnes (3,100 long tons; 3,500 short tons)
- Length: 114.8 m (376 ft 8 in)
- Beam: 16.3 m (53 ft 6 in)
- Draught: 6.0 m (19 ft 8 in)
- Installed power: 4 × ISM V1708 diesel generators, each producing 860 kilowatts (1,150 shp); Total output: 3,440 kW (4,610 shp)
- Propulsion: Combined diesel and diesel (CODAD) arrangement; 4 × MTU 20V 8000 M90, each rated at 9,100 kW (12,200 shp); Total output: 36,400 kW (48,800 shp)
- Speed: Maximum: 27 knots (50 km/h; 31 mph); Cruising: 18 kn (33 km/h; 21 mph)
- Range: 4,200 nautical miles (7,800 km)
- Complement: 71, excluding air crew detachment of approx. 19
- Sensors & processing systems: Search radar: Thales Herakles multi-function passive electronically scanned array radar; Navigation radar: Terma Electronic Scanter 2001; Sonar: EDO Model 980 active low frequency towed sonar (ALOFTS)
- Electronic warfare & decoys: ESM: RAFAEL C-PEARL-M; Decoys: Sagem Défense Sécurité New Generation Dagaie System, 2 × forward & 1 × aft; Leonardo Finmeccanica Morpheus anti-torpedo suite with WASS C310 launchers, 2 x aft
- Armament: Anti-ship: Unknown × Blue Spear SSM; Anti-air: 16-cell Sylver A50 VLS for MBDA Aster 15/30, 16-cell Sylver A43 VLS for MBDA Aster 15; Anti-submarine: 2 × B515 triple tubes with reloads for EuroTorp A244/S Mod 3 torpedoes; Guns: 1x OTO Melara 76mm Super Rapid gun; 4 × STK 50MG 12.7 mm (0.50 in) HMG; 2 × 25mm Mk 38 Mod2 Typhoon Weapon Station Stabilised Gun; Non-lethal: Long-Range Acoustic Device 500 Xtreme (LRAD500X)
- Aircraft carried: 1× S-70B Seahawk multi-mission capable naval helicopter
- Aviation facilities: Flight deck and enclosed hangar for up to two medium-lift helicopters

RSS Steadfast (70) is the third ship of the Formidable-class stealth frigate of the Republic of Singapore Navy. She is the first ship in the class to be seen fitted with the Blue Spear SSM.

== Construction and career ==
RSS Steadfast was built by ST Marine Engineering company in Singapore around the late 2000s. Steadfast was commissioned on 5 February 2008.

=== RIMPAC 2008 ===
Between 27 June to 31 July 2008, RSS Steadfast participated in the exercise alongside more than 30+ warships and 10+ submarines from different countries. The exercise took place off Hawaii in the Pacific Ocean.

=== CARAT 2010 ===
RSS Vigilance, RSS Steadfast, RSS Persistence, MV Avatar, USNS Amelia Earhart, USS Russell, USS Chung-Hoon and USCGC Mellon participated in CARAT 2010.

=== RIMPAC 2016 ===
RSS Steadfast was leading two multi-national warship from Okinawa to Hawaii for RIMPAC 2016 which lasts from 30 June to 4 August 2016.

On 27 May 2020, RSS Steadfast and USS Gabrielle Giffords conducted a bilateral exercise from 24 to 25 May in the South China Sea.

== Gallery ==
RSS Steadfast Gallery

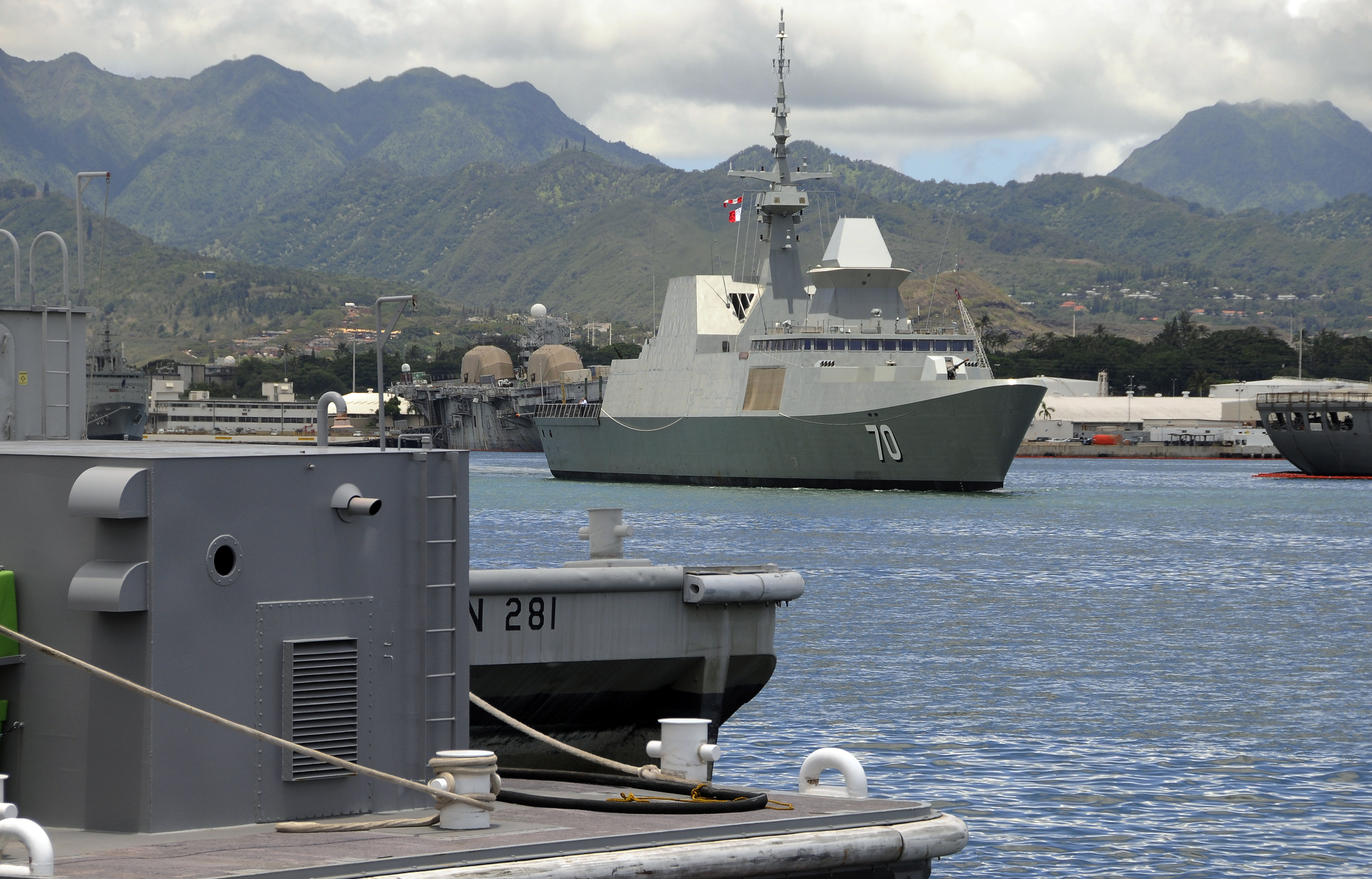
RSS Steadfast arriving at Pearl Harbor for RIMPAC 2008.

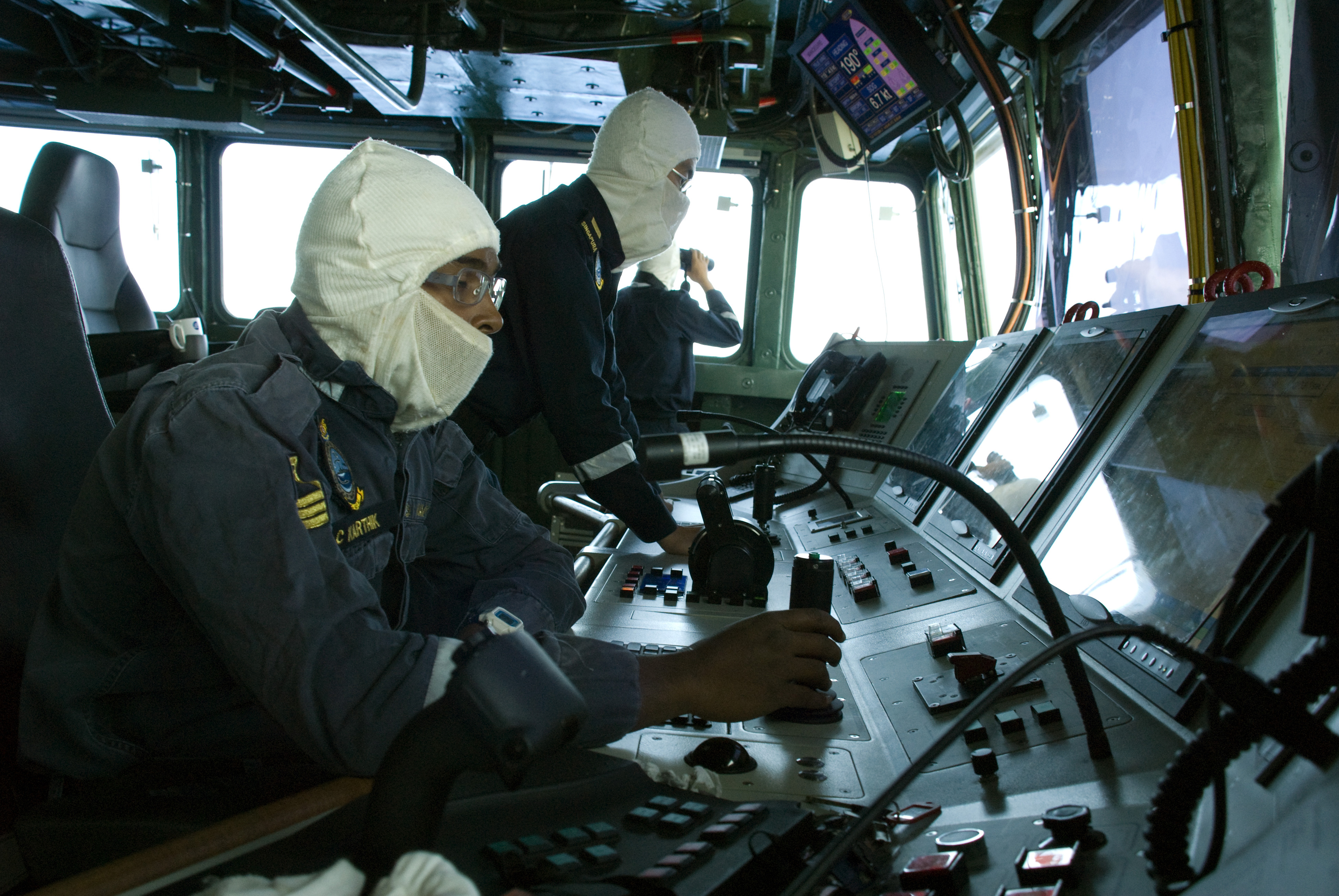
RSS Steadfast's bridge during RIMPAC 2008.

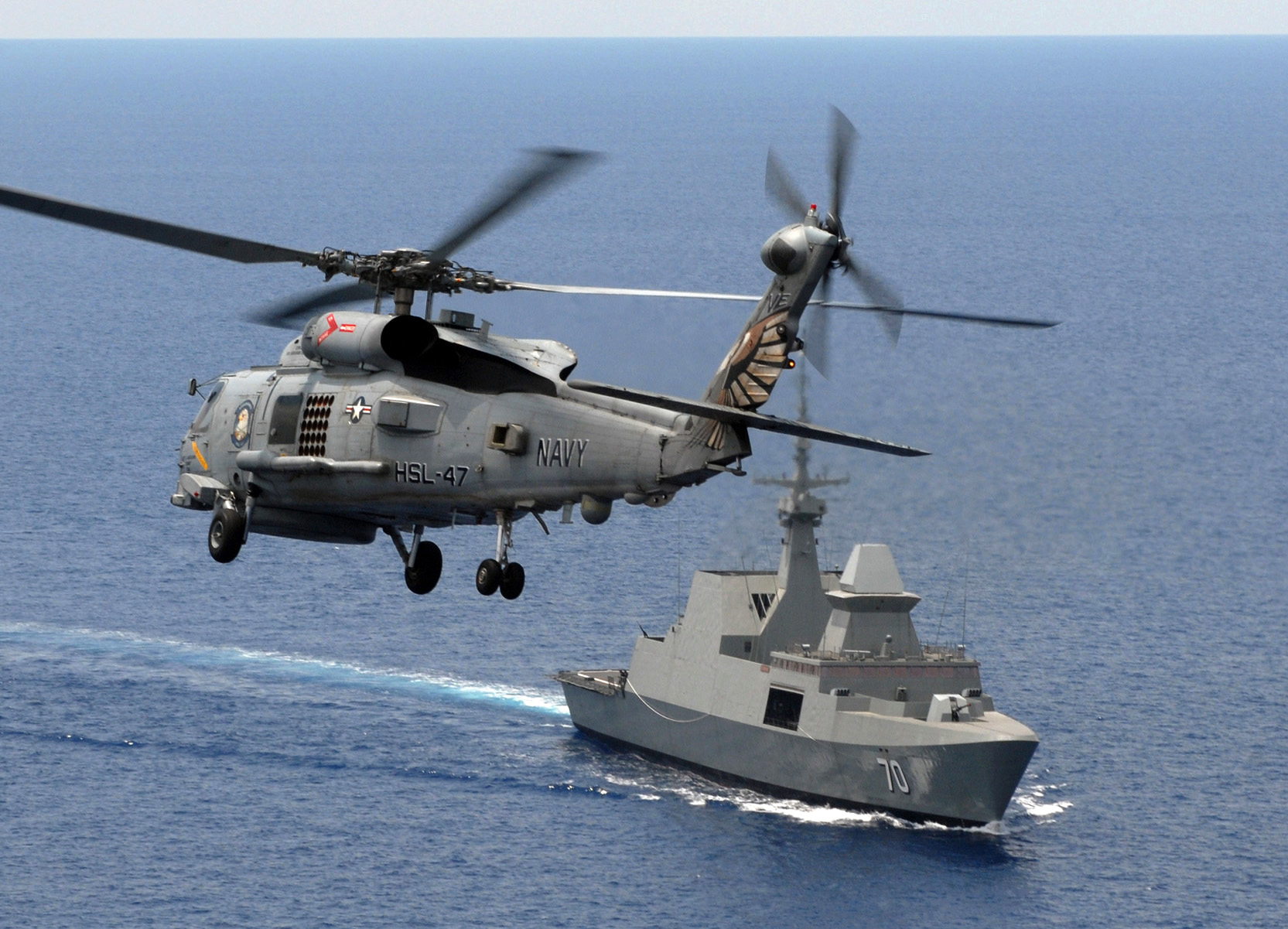
SH-60B from Helicopter Anti-submarine Squadron Light 47 banks over RSS Steadfast during flight deck qualifications with the Republic of Singapore Navy in April 2008.

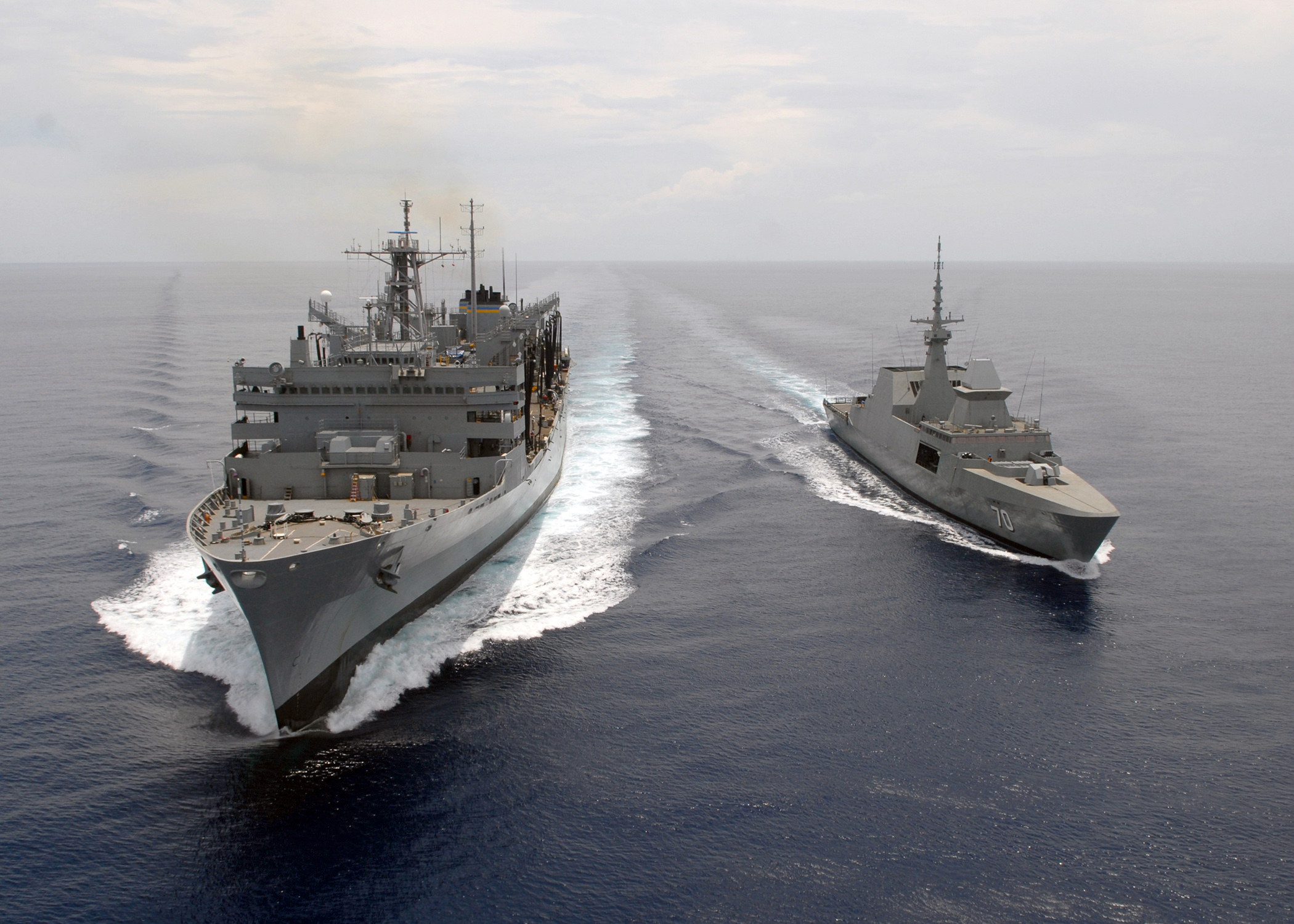
RSS Steadfast comes alongside the fast combat support ship USNS Rainer during a simulated refueling at sea on 15 April 2008.

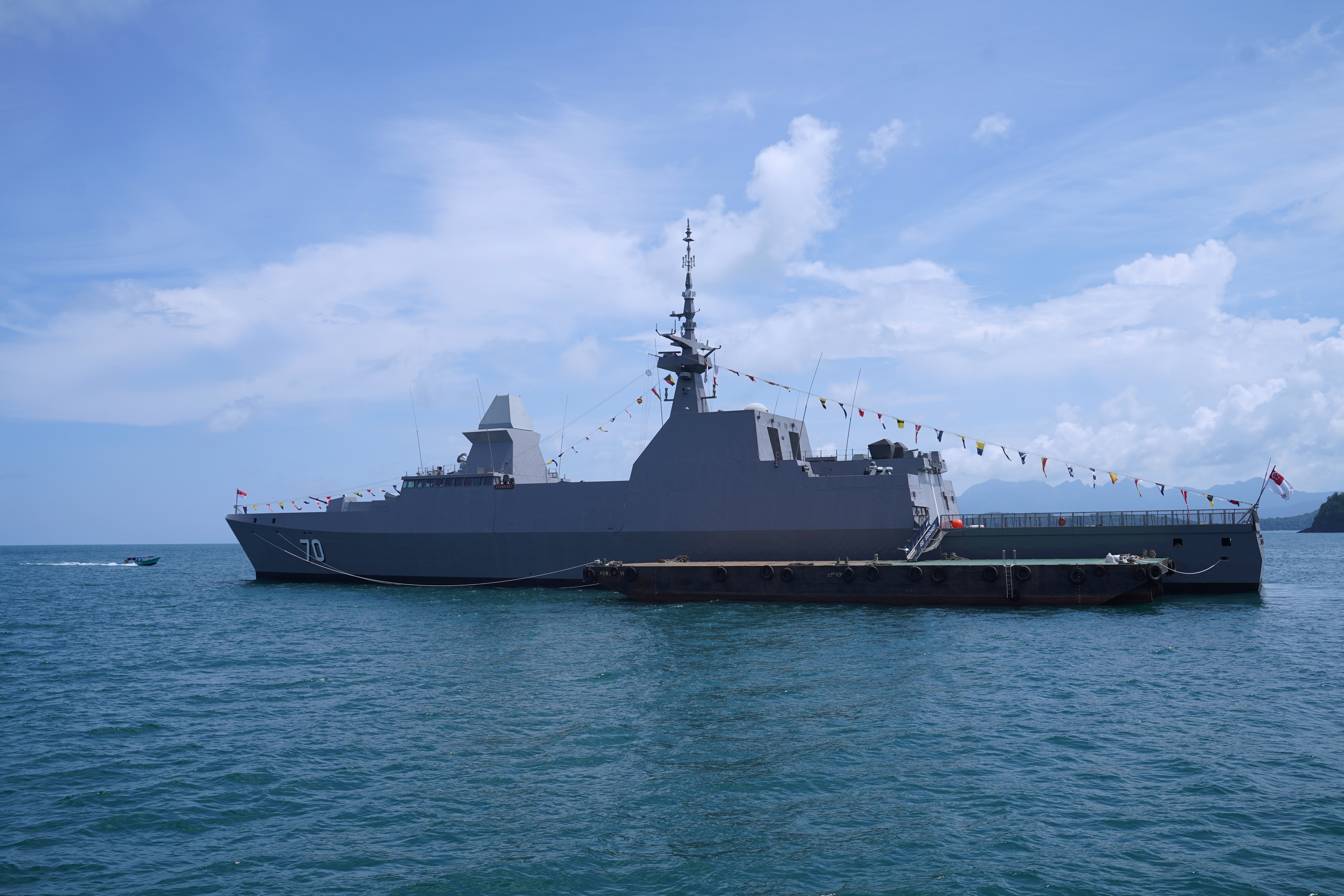
RSS Steadfast in Langkawi for LIMA2023.
