= RSS Valiant =

Victory-class corvette of Singapore Navy

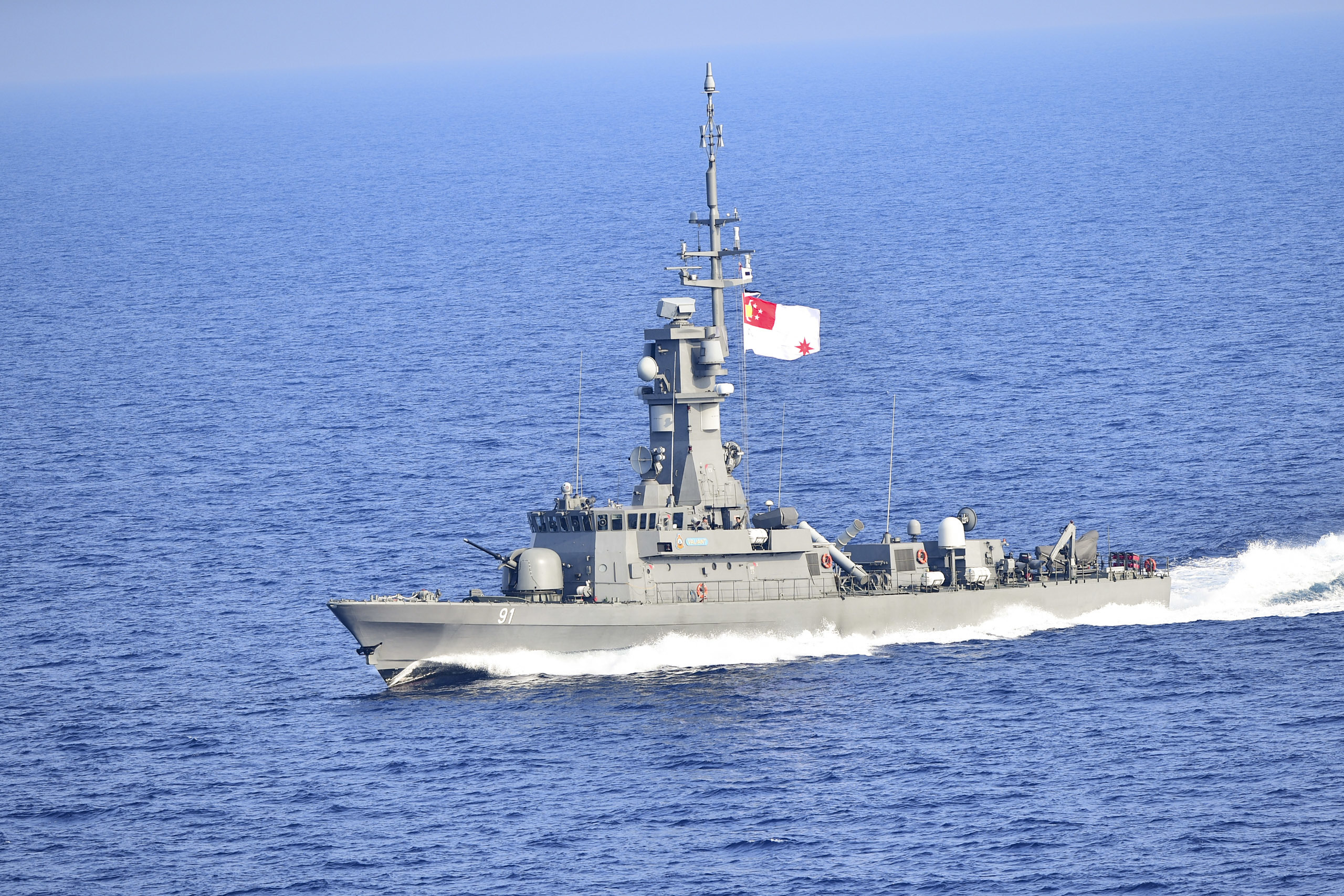
- RSS Valiant on 6 April 2018

History

Singapore
- Name: Valiant
- Namesake: Valiant
- Builder: ST Engineering
- Launched: 22 July 1989
- Commissioned: 25 May 1991
- Home port: Tuas
- Identification: MMSI number: 563720000; Pennant number: 91
- Motto: Fight Valiantly
- Status: Active

General characteristics
- Class & type: Victory-class corvette
- Displacement: 595 t (586 long tons; 656 short tons)
- Length: 62 m (203 ft 5 in)
- Beam: 8.5 m (27 ft 11 in)
- Draught: 2.6 m (8 ft 6 in)
- Propulsion: 4× Maybach MTU 16 V 538 TB93 high speed diesels coupled to 4× shafts; Total output: 16,900 hp (12,600 kW)
- Speed: Maximum: 37 knots (69 km/h; 43 mph); Cruising: 18 knots (33 km/h; 21 mph)
- Range: 4,000 nmi (7,400 km) at 18 knots (33 km/h; 21 mph)
- Complement: 49 with 8 officers
- Sensors & processing systems: Search radar: Ericsson/Radamec Sea Giraffe 150HC (G/H band) / Saab Sea Giraffe AMB post-2011 SLEP; Navigation radar: Kelvin Hughes 1007 (I band); Weapon control: Elbit MSIS optronic director; Sonar: Thomson Sintra TSM 2064 VDS
- Electronic warfare & decoys: ESM: Elisra SEWS; ECM: RAFAEL RAN 1101 Jammer; Decoys: 2× Plessey Shield 9-barrelled chaff launchers, 2× twin RAFAEL long range chaff launchers fitted below the bridge wings
- Armament: Anti-ship: 4 × Boeing Harpoon; Anti-air: 2 × 8-cell VLS for IAI/RAFAEL Barak; Anti-submarine: EuroTorp A244/S Mod 1 torpedoes launched from 2 × triple-tubes(all removed); Main gun: 1 × Oto Melara 76mm Super Rapid gun; Machine guns: 4 × STK 50MG 12.7 mm (0.50 in) HMGs
- Aircraft carried: 1× Boeing ScanEagle unmanned aerial vehicle (UAV)

RSS Valiant (91) is the fourth ship of the Victory-class corvette of the Republic of Singapore Navy.

== Construction and career ==
Valiant was launched on 22 July 1989 by ST Engineering and was commissioned on 25 May 1991.

=== Exercise Pelican 2015 ===
Singapore and Brunei concluded their flagship bilateral naval exercise on 27 November. Exercise Pelican ran from 23 to 27 November 2015, hosted by the Republic of Singapore Navy. The exercise featured RSS Stalwart, RSS Valiant, KDB Darussalam and KDB Darulehsan.

On 6 April 2018, RSS Supreme and RSS Valiant underwent alongside USS Sampson and USS Theodore Roosevelt off Singapore.
