= Formidable-class frigate =

Frigate class of the Republic of Singapore Navy

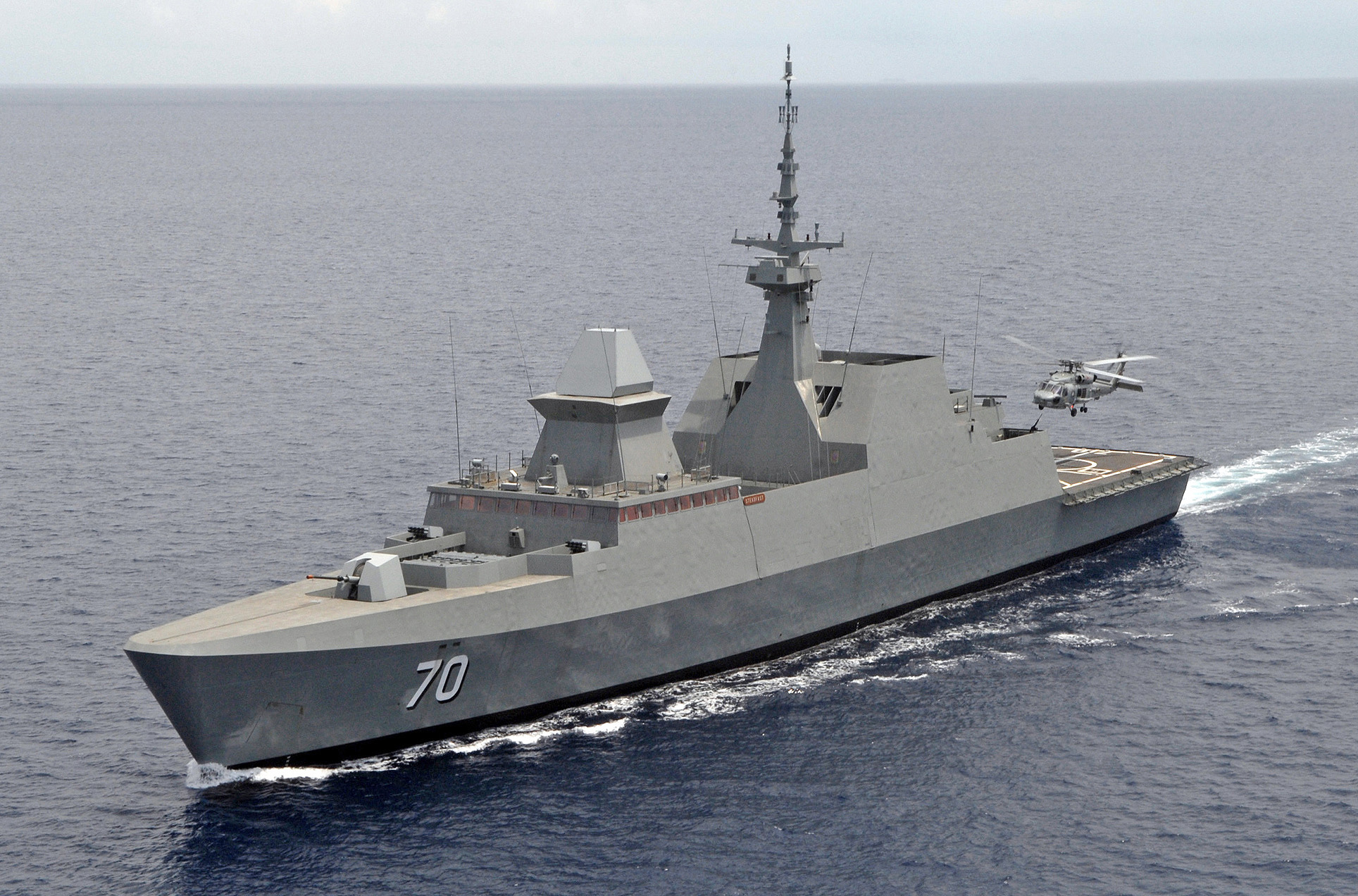
- RSS Steadfast in 2008

Class overview
- Name: Formidable class
- Builders: DCNS, Lorient; ST Engineering (Marine), Benoi, Singapore
- Operators: Republic of Singapore Navy
- Built: 2002–2009
- In commission: 2007–present
- Completed: 6
- Active: 6

General characteristics
- Type: Frigate
- Displacement: 3,200 tonnes (3,150 long tons; 3,530 short tons)
- Length: 114.8 m (376 ft 8 in)
- Beam: 16.3 m (53 ft 6 in)
- Draught: 6.0 m (19 ft 8 in)
- Installed power: 4 × ISM V1708 diesel generators, each producing 860 kilowatts (1,150 shp); Total output: 3,440 kW (4,610 shp)
- Propulsion: Combined diesel and diesel (CODAD) arrangement; 4 × MTU 20V 8000 M90, each rated at 9,100 kW (12,200 shp); Total output: 36,400 kW (48,800 shp)
- Speed: Maximum: 27 knots (50.0 km/h; 31.1 mph); Cruising: 18 kn (33.3 km/h; 20.7 mph)
- Range: 4,200 nautical miles (7,780 km)
- Complement: 71, excluding air crew detachment of approx. 19
- Sensors & processing systems: Search radar: Thales Herakles multi-function passive electronically scanned array radar; Fire-control radar: Thales STING EO Mk2; Navigation radar: Terma Electronic Scanter 2001; Sonar: EDO Model 980 active low frequency towed sonar (ALOFTS)
- Electronic warfare & decoys: ESM: RAFAEL C-PEARL-M; Decoys: Sagem Défense Sécurité New Generation Dagaie System, 2 × forward & 1 × aft; Leonardo Finmeccanica Morpheus anti-torpedo suite with WASS C310 launchers, 2 x aft
- Armament: Anti-ship: 8 (Up to 24) × RGM-84C Harpoon SSMs, to be replaced by Blue Spear SSM; Anti-air: 16-cell Sylver A50 VLS for MBDA Aster 15/30, 16-cell Sylver A43 VLS for MBDA Aster 15; Anti-submarine: 2 × B515 triple tubes with reloads for EuroTorp A244/S Mod 3 torpedoes; Guns: 1x OTO Melara 76mm Super Rapid gun; 4 × STK 50MG 12.7 mm (0.50 in) HMG; 2 × 25mm Mk 38 Mod2 Typhoon Weapon Station Stabilised Gun; Non-lethal: Long-Range Acoustic Device 500 Xtreme (LRAD500X)
- Aircraft carried: 1 × S-70B Seahawk multi-mission capable naval helicopter
- Aviation facilities: Flight deck and enclosed hangar for up to two medium-lift helicopters
- Notes: Sources:

The Formidable-class multi-role stealth frigates are multi-mission derivatives of the French Navy's La Fayette-class frigate in service with the Republic of Singapore Navy. The six ships form the First Flotilla of the Navy.

== Planning and acquisition ==
The search for a replacement for the aging Sea Wolf-class missile gunboats, which entered into service in 1972, started in the mid-1990s. The United States, Sweden and France participated in the bid for the contract. In March 2000, the Singapore Ministry of Defence awarded the contract to DCNS for the design and construction of six frigates. A key feature of the contract was the technology transfer arrangement. Under the arrangement, DCNS was to design and build the first frigate in its Lorient yard in France while the remaining five frigates were to be built locally by Singapore Technologies (ST) Marine at its Benoi yard in Singapore. Subsequent maintenance and mid-life retrofit will be done by ST Marine.

Construction of Formidable began in late 2002, when the keel was laid down in Lorient in November 2002.

== Design and construction ==
Radar cross section (RCS) reduction features have been incorporated into the Formidable class design, with inclined hull sides and bulwarks as well as concealment of ship boats and replenishment-at-sea equipment behind low-RCS curtains. The Formidable class have a significantly reduced profile than the La Fayette class and its other derivatives, due to the smaller superstructure and the use of enclosed sensor mast technology. The frigate is also constructed entirely of steel, unlike the La Fayette class which makes extensive use of weight-saving composite structures in its aft superstructure block. The frigates also possess better sea keeping qualities and are able to stay at sea for longer periods of time.

=== Sensors and systems ===
The frigates are equipped with the Thales Herakles passive electronically scanned array multi-function radar, which provides three-dimensional surveillance for up to 250 km (155.3 mi). The radar provides all-round automatic search and tracking of both air and surface targets, and is integrated with the MBDA Aster air defence system. Utilising the DCNS Sylver vertical launch system (VLS), each frigate is equipped with 32 cells. It is reported that the frigates have a special surface-to-air missile configuration, combining the Thales Herakles radar with the Sylver A50 launcher and a mix of Aster 15 and 30 missiles.

The Formidable-class frigates are key nodes within the Singapore Armed Forces' Integrated Knowledge-based Command and Control network, a concept similar to the United States Department of Defense's network-centric warfare doctrine. The locally developed Combat Management System integrates all the sensors and weapon systems on board, and a dual Fast Ethernet data transfer system forms the backbone of this system.

Each frigate has a span of influence that stretches up to about 200 nmi (370 km), where it acts as the Navy's mobile operations centre out at sea and receives information from sister ships and aerial assets deployed within the range. The Combat Management System will then make sense of the different data, establish an accurate picture of the area of operations, and send the information back to shore and to its army and air force counterparts. This increases battlespace awareness and allows little time for the enemy to react due to the short sensor-to-shooter loops.

=== Armament ===
The frigates are equipped with 2 Sylver A43 8-cell modules vertical launching systems (VLS) which can launch the MBDA Aster 15 and 2 Sylver A50 8-cell modules VLS which can launch either the MBDA Aster 15/30. Both the Aster 15 and 30 share the same warhead, active RF seeker and terminal dart providing the Formidable-class frigates with an all-round anti-missile and anti-air capability to ensure self-defence and fleet protection against swarms of anti-ship missiles and multiple aircraft. The Aster 15 is a short-to-medium range surface-to-air missile with a range of about 30 km (16 nmi), providing the Formidable-class frigates with self and local area air defence while the Aster 30 is a short-to-long range surface-to-air missile with a range of about 120 km (64 nmi) providing area and extended area air defence.

The frigates are equipped with Boeing Harpoon missiles and OTO Melara 76 mm guns for surface defence. The Harpoon missile has a range of 130 km (70 nmi) and uses active radar guidance. It is armed with a 227 kg (500 lb) warhead. There is space for as many as 24 Harpoon missiles at the center of ship making it the most well armed ship of its class. The Harpoon missiles will be replaced with the Blue Spear SSM co-developed by IAI and ST Engineering as part of the Formidable-class ongoing mid-life upgrade (MLU) programme, giving the frigates additional beyond-line-of-sight (BLOS) as well as sea and land attack capabilities.

The 76 mm gun fires 6 kg (13 lb) shells to a maximum range of 30 km (33,000 yd) at a firing rate of up to 120 rounds per minute. As part of the mid-life upgrade programme, the Formidable-class frigates' 76 mm main gun will be replaced with the OTO Melara 76 mm gun with STRALES system which uses Driven Ammunition Reduced Time of Flight (DART) projectiles that are guided by a radio beam that follows the target through a homing system to engage high-speed, maneuvering drones, missiles, and fast-moving, small, and agile vessels of ranges up to 5km.

The frigates are also equipped with the EDO Corporation active low frequency towed sonar to enable long range submarine detection and classification, as well as EuroTorp A244/S Mod 3 lightweight torpedoes fired from two B515 triple-tube launchers hidden behind the bulwark.

The frigates are equipped with Sikorsky S-70B naval helicopters, an international derivative of the United States Navy Sikorsky SH-60B Seahawk. The Ministry of Defence signed a contract with Sikorsky Aircraft Corporation in January 2005 to acquire six of these helicopters, which will be organic to the frigates. Each of these naval helicopters are equipped with a Telephonics AN/APS-143 Ocean Eye X-band maritime surveillance and tracking radar, a L-3 Communications Helicopter Long Range Active Sonar (HELRAS) dipping sonar, EuroTorp A244/S Mod 3 torpedoes and a Raytheon AAS-44 electro-optic system to provide infrared detection and tracking. The naval helicopters will be raised as a squadron in the Republic of Singapore Air Force and piloted by air force pilots, but the system operators will be from the Navy.

== Mid-life upgrades ==
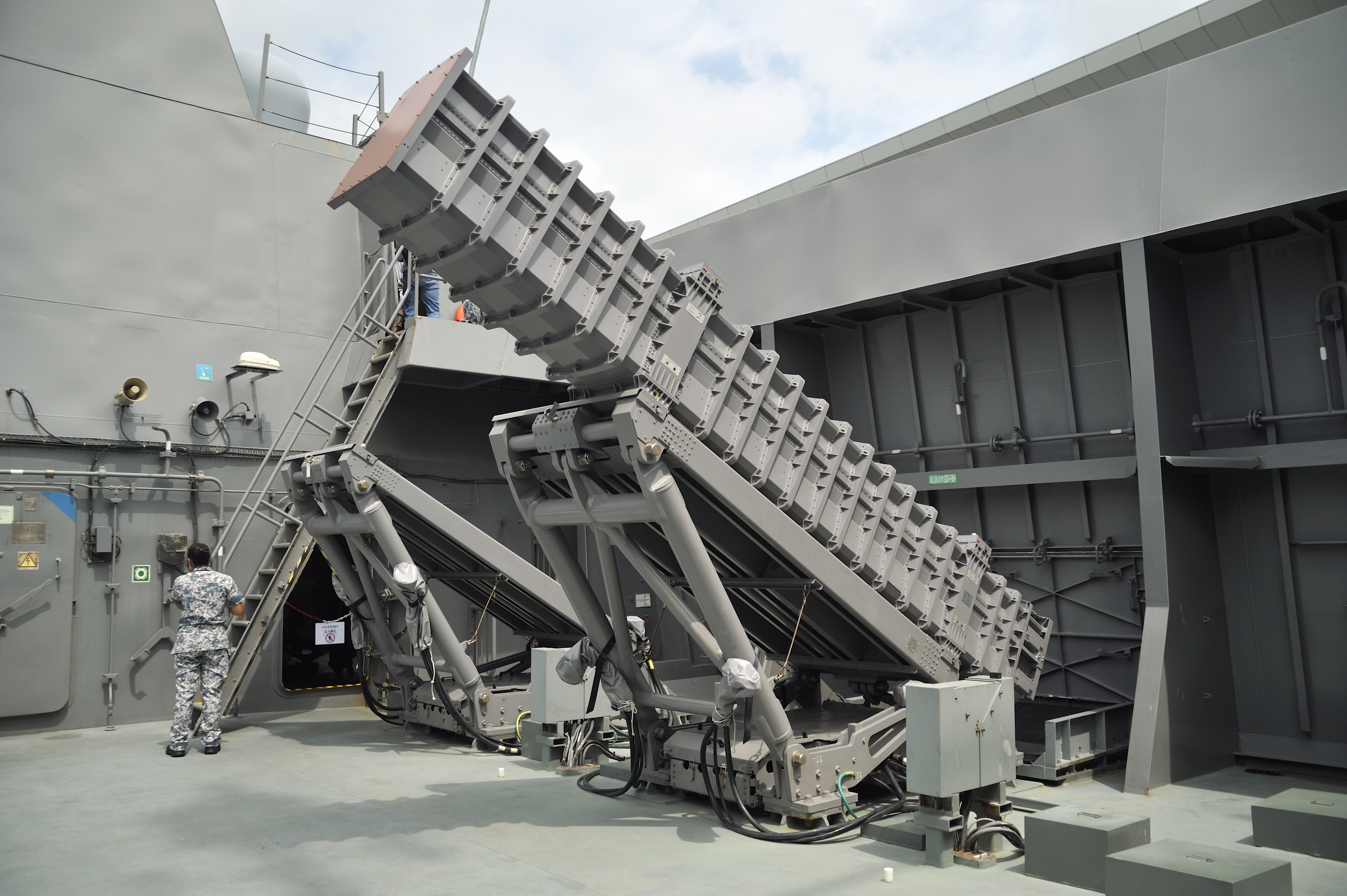
Blue Spear SSM launch canisters

On 5 May 2023, the Ministry of Defence of Singapore announced plans to update the capabilities of the Formidable class frigates. On 14 December 2023, ST Engineering received the contract for the upgrade which it expects to complete by 2028. A related contract was announced by Naval Group on 2 May 2024 to support the upgrade as partners of ST Marine.

On August 19 2026, during a scheduled port visit to Tokyo International Cruise Terminal, RSS Steadfast was the first ship in the class to be publicly photographed with Blue Spear launch canisters.

== Ships in class ==
Name	Pennant number	Builder	Launched	Commissioned	Status
RSS Formidable	68	DCNS, France	7 January 2004	5 May 2007	Active
RSS Intrepid	69	ST Engineering, Singapore	3 July 2004	5 February 2008	Active
RSS Steadfast	70	ST Engineering, Singapore	28 January 2005	5 February 2008	Active
RSS Tenacious	71	ST Engineering, Singapore	15 July 2005	5 February 2008	Active
RSS Stalwart	72	ST Engineering, Singapore	9 December 2005	16 January 2009	Active
RSS Supreme	73	ST Engineering, Singapore	9 May 2006	16 January 2009	Active

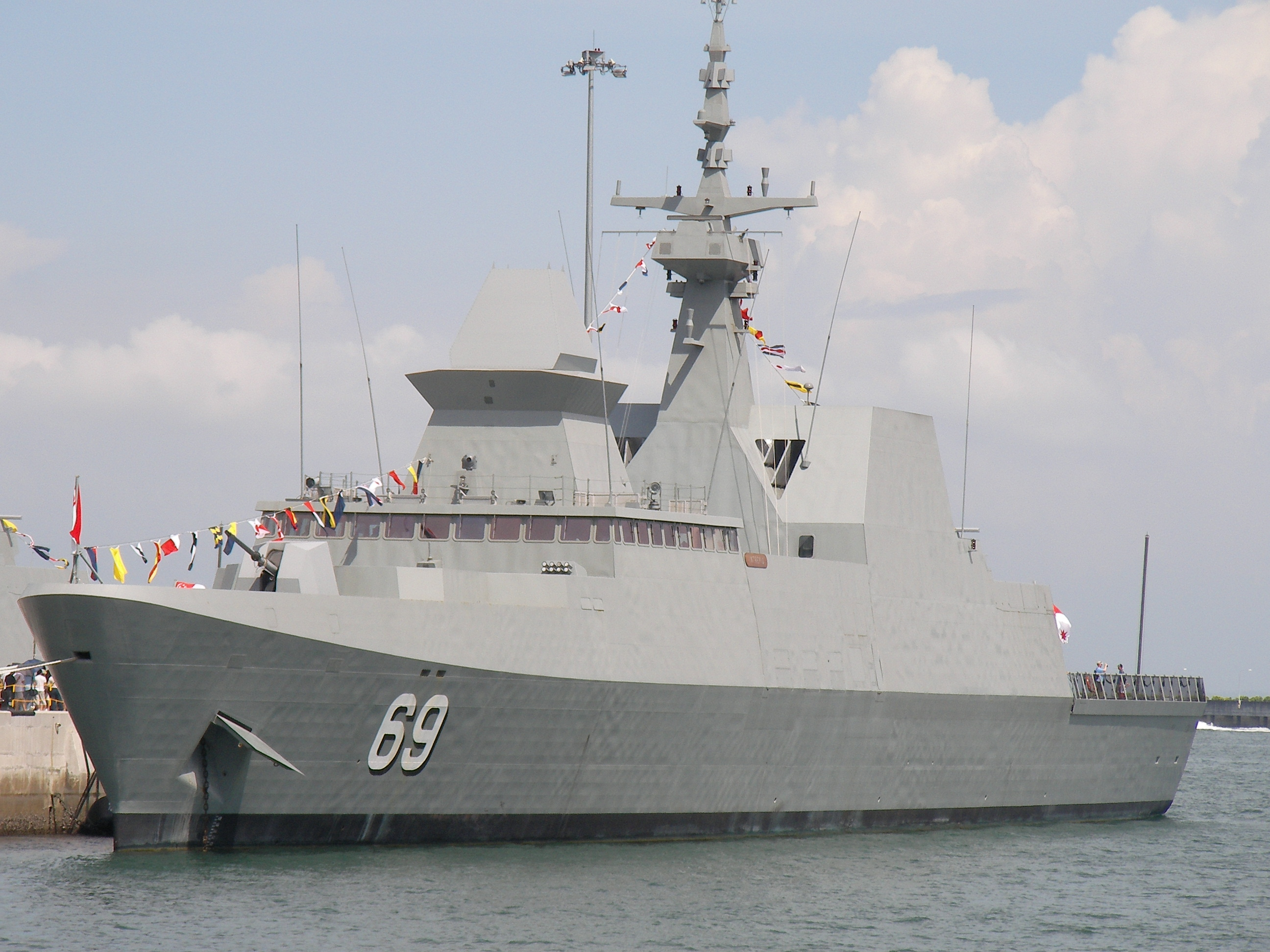
RSS Intrepid in port

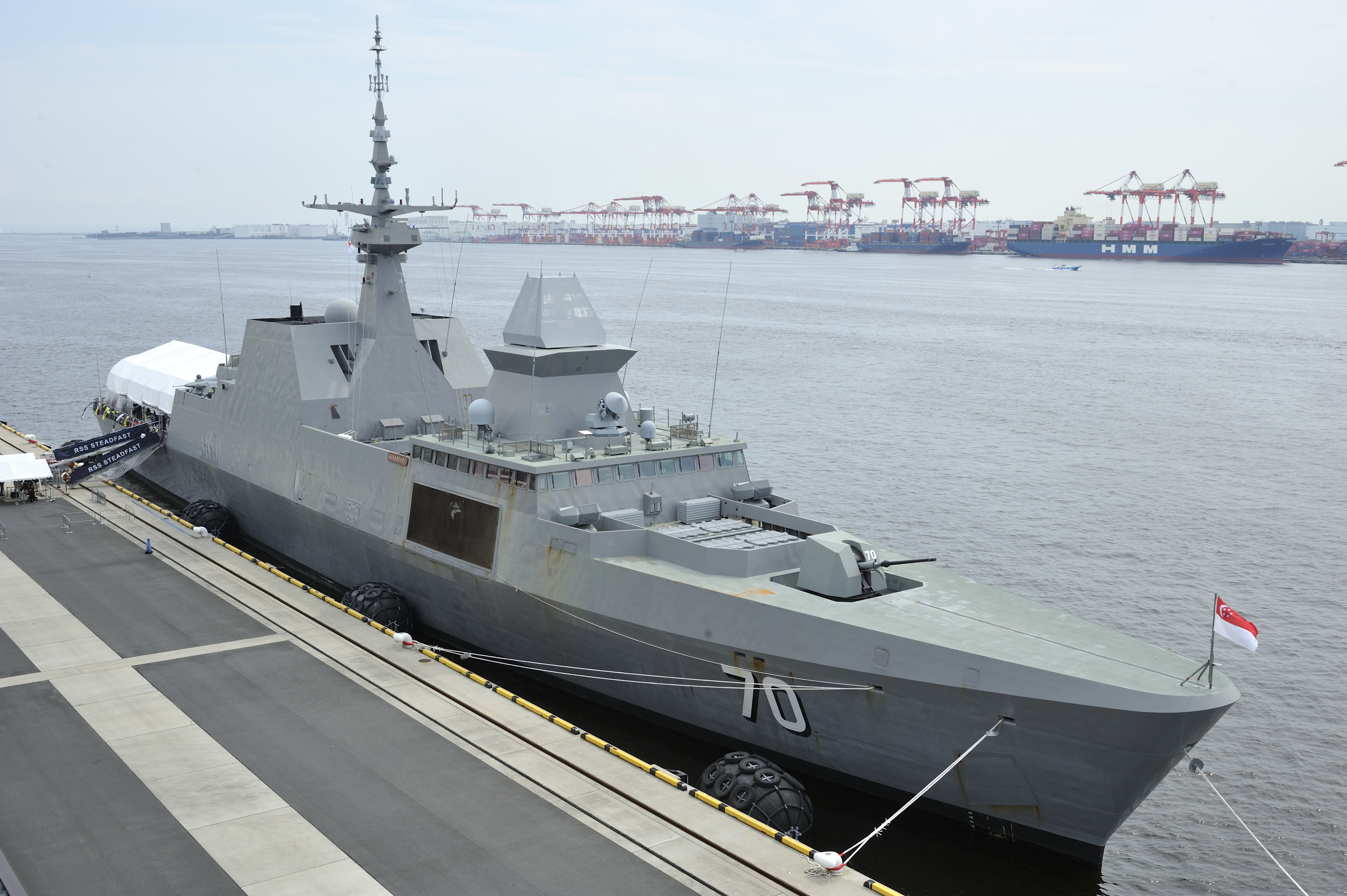
RSS Steadfast at the Tokyo International Cruise Terminal

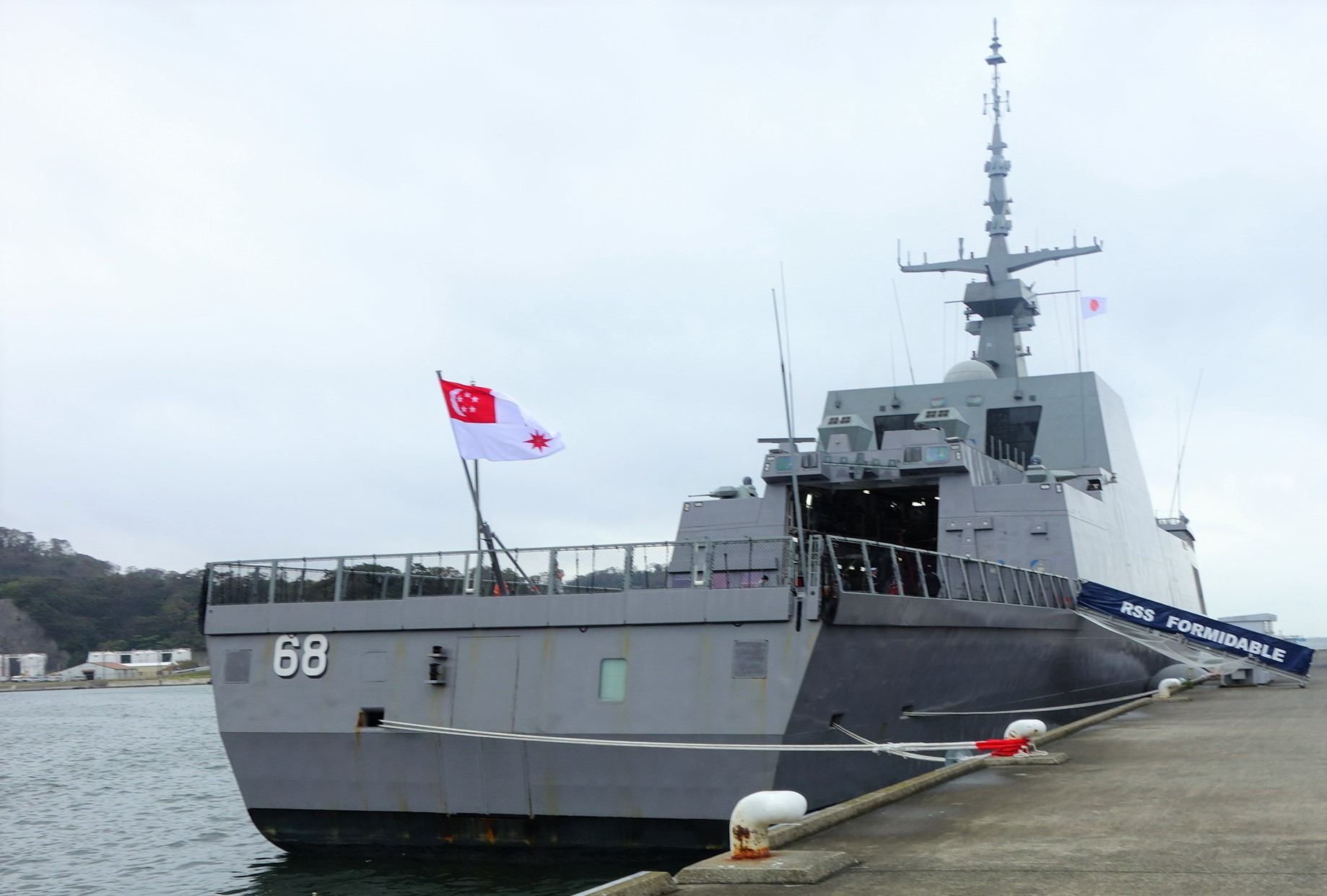
RSS Formidable stern view

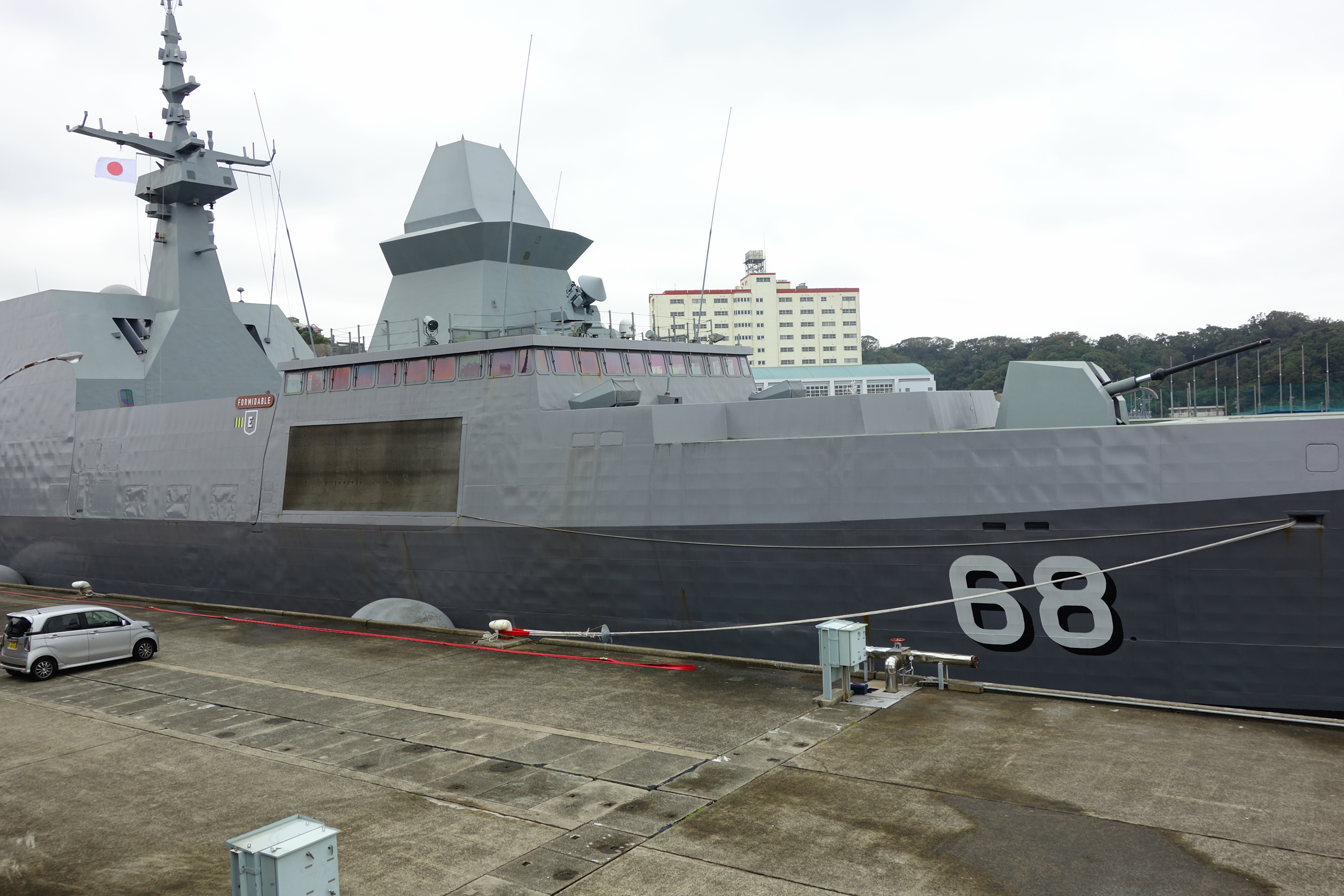
Bridge of RSS Formidable

== Operational history ==
The six frigates form the First Flotilla of the RSN.

RSS Formidable participated in Exercise Malabar 07-2 in September 2007, a Theater Security Cooperation engagement involving the navies of the United States, India, Australia, Japan and Singapore. The exercise involved more than 20,000 personnel on 28 ships and 150 aircraft, including the USS Kitty Hawk Carrier Strike Group.

RSS Intrepid conducted the navy's inaugural live firing of the French-made Aster 15 surface-to-air missile on 2 April 2008, off the French coast of Toulon. The frigate successfully shot down an aerial drone simulating an enemy target with an Aster missile. It was reported that the frigate sailed halfway round the world to test fire the Aster missiles due to the crowded air and sealanes around Singapore and the lack of an instrumented firing range needed by defence engineers to track and measure the performance of the Aster missile.

RSS Steadfast participated in the world's largest multilateral naval exercise RIMPAC for the first time from 27 June to 31 July 2008, which involved 20,000 personnel from 10 countries operating over 35 ships, six submarines and over 150 aircraft. During this exercise, RSS Steadfast launched a Harpoon missile on a decommissioned USN warship on 14 July 2008 and also refueled at sea with a contingent of USN vessels. Participation in this exercise also validated the RSN's ability to conduct sustained sea operations.

On 16 November 2009, the Republic of Singapore Air Force established its Peace Triton Sikorsky S-70B Seahawk Naval Helicopter detachment at the USN Maritime Strike Weapons School in San Diego, California to undertake qualification and operational training under the umbrella of the USN's SH-60F Aircraft Qualification Course. RSS Stalwart was deployed to southern California to support ship/air integration activities. On 25 March 2010, the Minister for Defence Teo Chee Hean announced that the Seahawk integration programme had successfully concluded with a "high-tempo, week-long exercise" involving assets from both the RSN and USN, including five surface ships, a submarine, maritime patrol aircraft and F/A-18 Hornet combat jets.

In September 2012 the RSN deployed RSS Intrepid and an S-70B naval helicopter in support of Combined Task Force 151 (CTF 151), a multinational effort to fight piracy in the shipping lanes off Somalia. This was the first operational deployment of a Formidable-class frigate and naval helicopter for counter-piracy operations in the Gulf of Aden. This was followed by a second deployment in March 2014 of a task group comprising RSS Tenacious and another S-70B, the fifth such mission undertaken by the SAF.

On 9 March 2014, RSS Steadfast was deployed along with other air and sea assets to assist with the search and rescue operations of Malaysia Airlines Flight 370.

In December 2014, RSS Supreme was deployed in the search for Airasia Flight QZ8501 after it crashed into the Java Sea on 28 December 2014; along with RSS Valour, RSS Persistence, RSS Kallang, MV Swift Rescue, and two Lockheed C-130H Hercules.

On 26 July 2021, RSS Intrepid conducted a passage exercise with HMS Queen Elizabeth, the flagship of United Kingdom Carrier Strike Group 21 and her escort ships, together with RSS Unity and RSS Resolution, marking the first time the RSN has conducted an exercise with a UK Carrier Strike Group.

On 2 March 2022, MINDEF announced plans to upgrade the Formidable class frigate as part of its plans for a modernized, next generation SAF 2040. This entails comprehensive upgrades to all of its subsystems, including armament, combat systems and communications equipment.

From 1 to 7 November 2022, RSS Formidable participated in the Japanese Maritime Self Defence Force's 70th anniversary International Fleet Review in Yokosuka, Japan alongside 38 other ships from 13 countries. During the visit, the crew participated in a city parade marching alongside other navies as well as participating in the review sail-past by Japanese Prime Minister Kishida Fumio. RSS Formidable was also included in a multilateral search and rescue exercise conducted by the JMSDF.

== See also ==
- List of frigate classes in service

Equivalent frigates of the same era

- Type 054
- Incheon class
- Valour class
- Project 11356R
- Absalon class
- Fridtjof Nansen class
