= MV Avatar =

Refitted cargo vessel

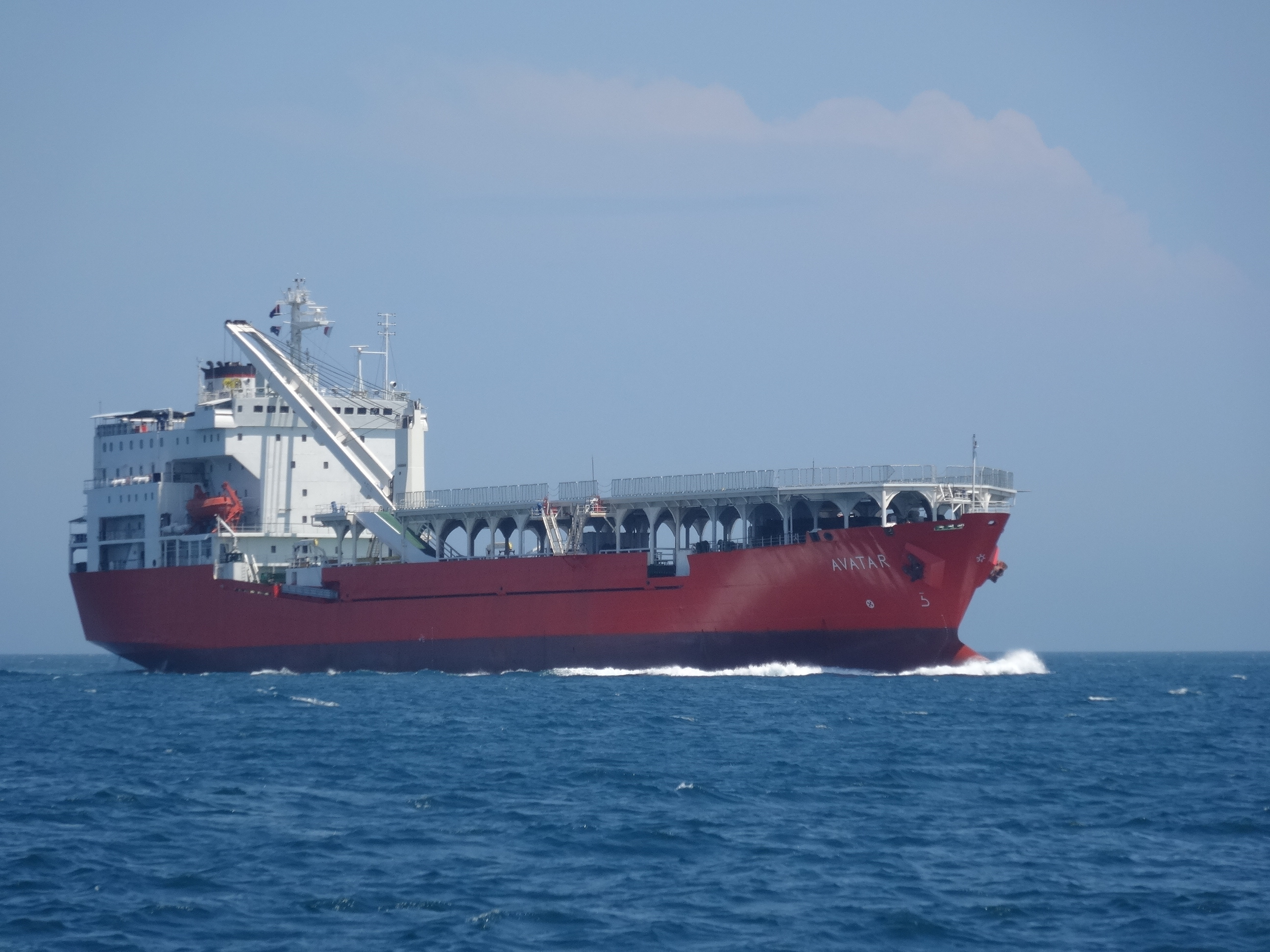
- MV Avatar off the coast of Tangalooma, Queensland

History

Singapore
- Name: MV Avatar
- Owner: Valour Offshore Marine Services
- Operator: Republic of Singapore Navy
- Builder: Warnowwerft Shipyard; Rostock, East Germany
- Laid down: 4 May 1983
- Launched: 23 August 1983
- Completed: 30 December 1983
- Homeport: Singapore
- Identification: IMO : 8314586; MMSI : 564423000; Call Sign : S6KF
- Status: Active

General characteristics
- Tonnage: 15,893 GT; 8,092 NT; 17,850 DWT
- Displacement: 16,557 tonnes
- Length: 173.5 m (569 ft 3 in)
- Beam: 23.05 m (75 ft 7 in)
- Draught: 10.02 m (32 ft 10 in)
- Speed: 12 knots (22 km/h; 14 mph)
- Complement: 32
- Aviation facilities: Helicopter landing platform

MV Avatar was a general cargo vessel in service with the Republic of Singapore Navy as a training vessel. She is owned by Valour Offshore Marine Services and was leased to the Defence Science and Technology Agency from 2001-2023, a statutory board under the Ministry of Defence. Avatar was not a commissioned navy warship and flew the state marine ensign instead of the naval ensign.

== Merchant career ==
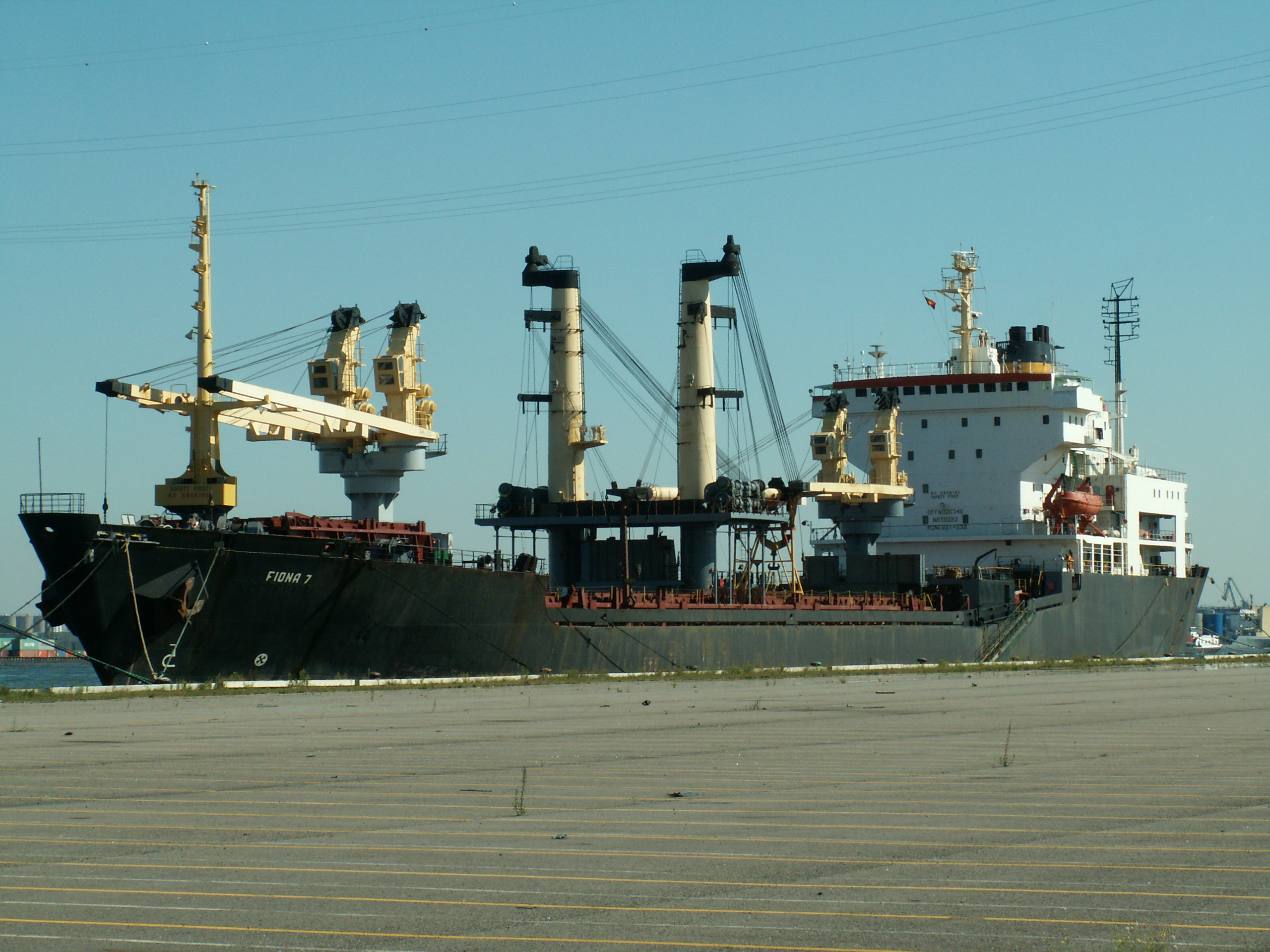
Sister ship Fiona 7 in 2005

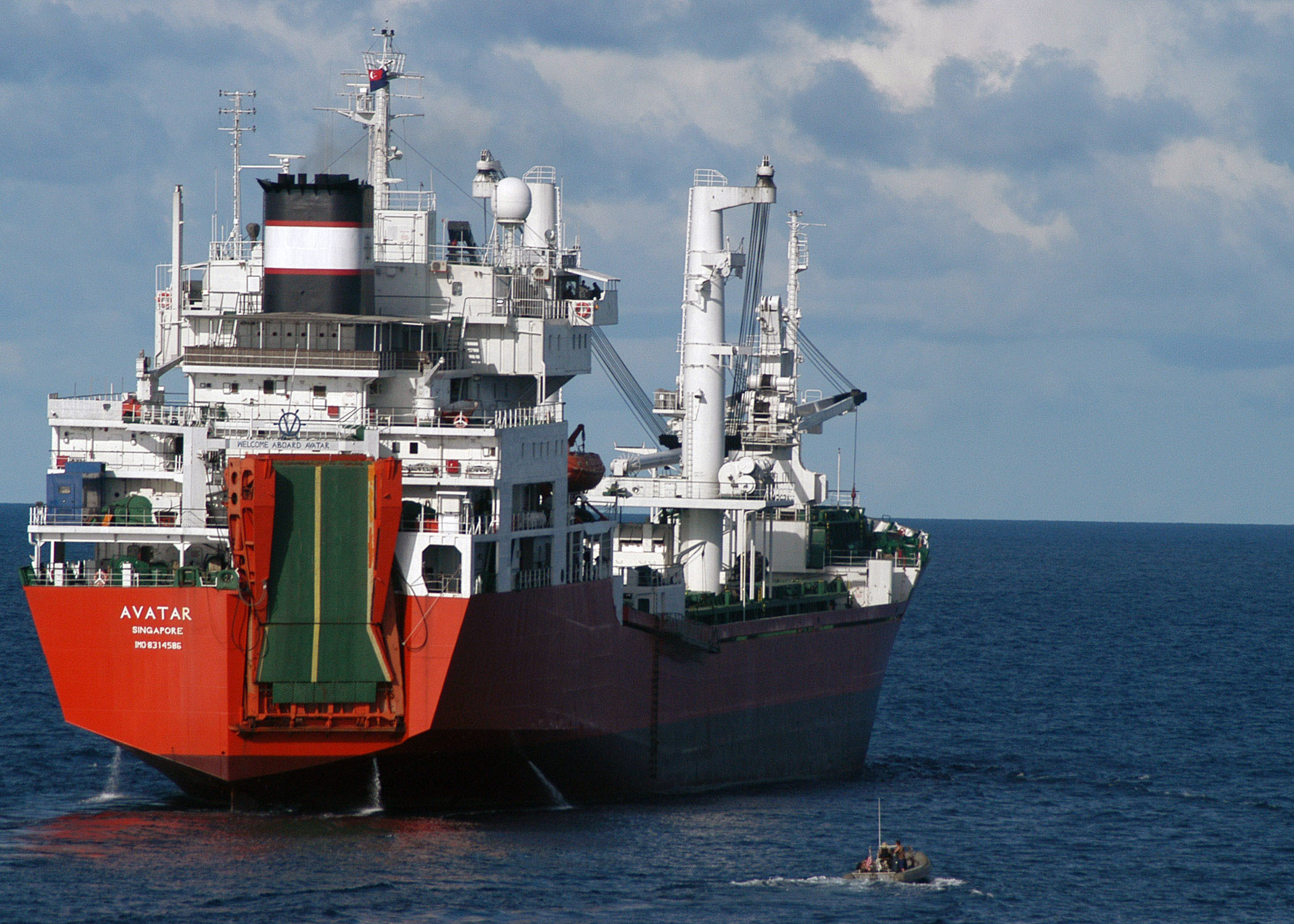
Avatar participating in CARAT 2010, prior to her refit

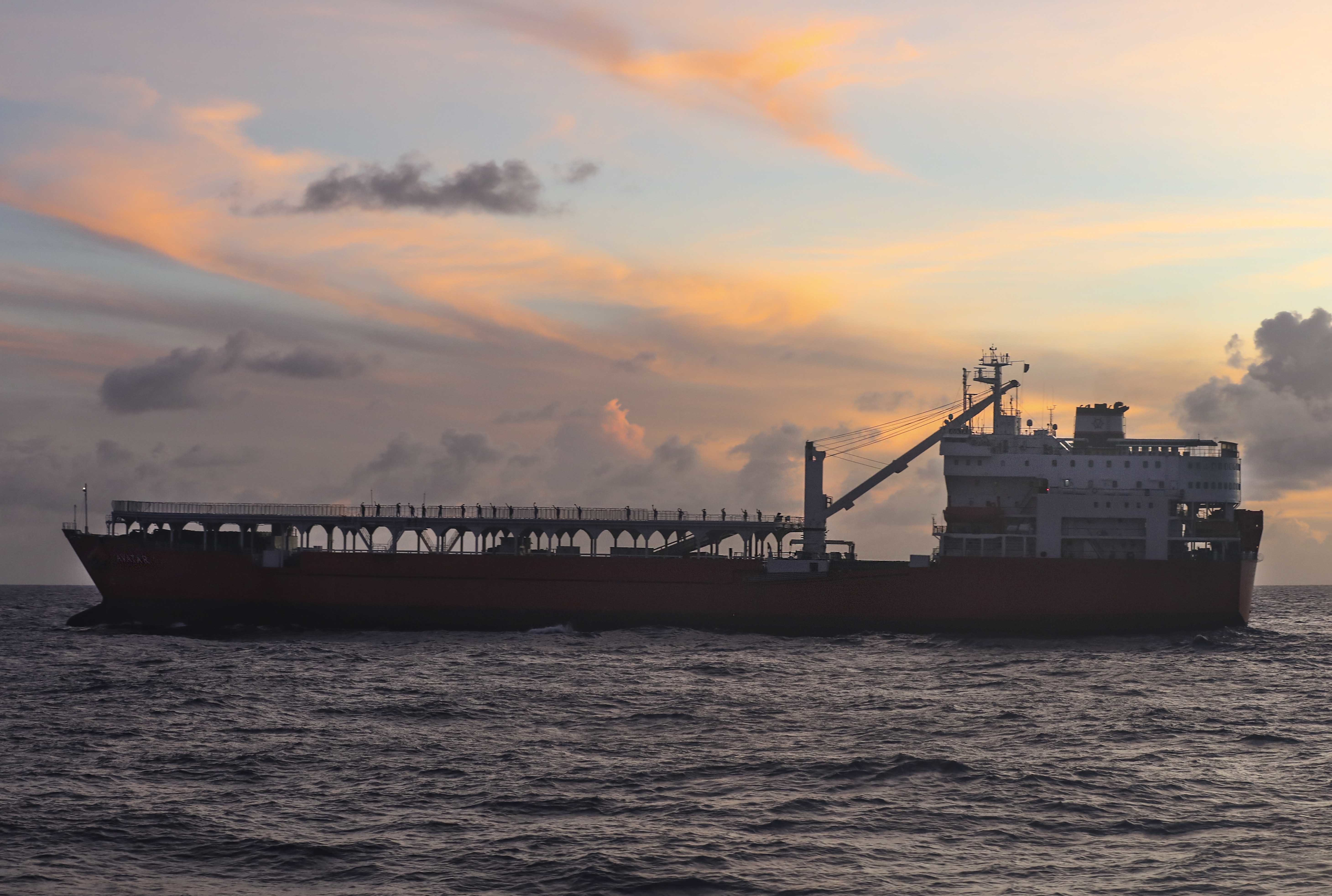
Avatar participating in Pacific Griffin 2021

The ship was laid down on 4 May 1983, launched on 23 August as Astrakhan and delivered the same year on 30 December by the Warnowwerft shipyard in Rostock, East Germany. She was the first of Warnowwerft's Type 18 series of lift-on-lift-off/roll-on-roll-off (LORO) vessels. The development of the class was intended to allow a wider range of cargo to be carried that a conventional RORO ship would not accommodate, in addition to supporting military supply operations.

Astrakhan was operated by the Soviet, then Russian, Baltic Shipping Company until 1995 when she was sold to the Cyprus-based Astrapride Shipping Company Ltd., re-registered under the Cyprus flag, and renamed Admetos. In 1997, she was again sold to Willows Maritime Ltd., re-registered in Malta, and firstly renamed Quetzal and then Norbulk Ramin.

Valour Offshore Marine Services Pte. Ltd. of Singapore subsequently acquired Norbulk Ramin in September 2000 and renamed her Avatar, registering her in Singapore. She was leased to the Republic of Singapore Navy (RSN) as a training platform from 2001-2023.

== Navy service ==
=== Boarding operations ===
The RSN used Avatar as a training platform to simulate vessel hijackings and boarding operations, also known as visit, board, search, and seizure (VBSS).

In August 2005, Avatar was part of the multilateral Exercise Deep Sabre as a hijacked vessel, being boarded by Naval Diving Unit commandos. The Chemical, Biological, Radiological and Explosive (CBRE) Defence Group, Japan Coast Guard and Australian Customs Service were also involved in the operation.

In May 2016, Avatar was involved in the inaugural multinational Asean Defence Ministers' Meeting-Plus Maritime Security and Counter-Terrorism exercise (ADMM-Plus). During the 11-day ADMM-Plus exercise, she again served as a hijacked vessel, with a SAF Special Forces team rappelling onto her deck from a helicopter, while other nations' special forces teams boarded her via her shipside with rigid inflatable boats.

In July 2021, Avatar participated in Exercise Pacific Griffin with the United States Navy near the US territory of Guam, as part of a counter-terrorism exercise.

=== Helicopter operations ===
Avatar was refitted to support two helicopter landing decks rated for the RSAF Super Puma or Cougar helicopters. The refit program expanded her flight deck and removed her cranes to enhance helicopter operations.

=== Typhoon Nepartak ===
In July 2016, Avatar was berthed in the Port of Kaohsiung when Typhoon Nepartak impacted Taiwan with wind speeds reaching as high as 150 km/h. Six of seven mooring lines snapped, resulting in the ship drifting but still tied to the pier bollard by a single rope. Avatar narrowly missed colliding with a Republic of China Navy Cheng Kung-class frigate before being pushed back alongside, with the assistance of two tugboats.

=== Ending of lease ===
Avatar's lease with the RSN ended on 6 July 2023, and she departed Changi Naval Base.

On 19 may, 2024 the ship Was renamed ATAR, with the Saint Kitts & Nevis as new flag and sold to Chittagong ship breakers.
