= Changi Naval Base =

Naval base at the eastern end of Singapore

- RSS Singapura – Changi Naval Base
- Changi Bay; Near Changi in Singapore
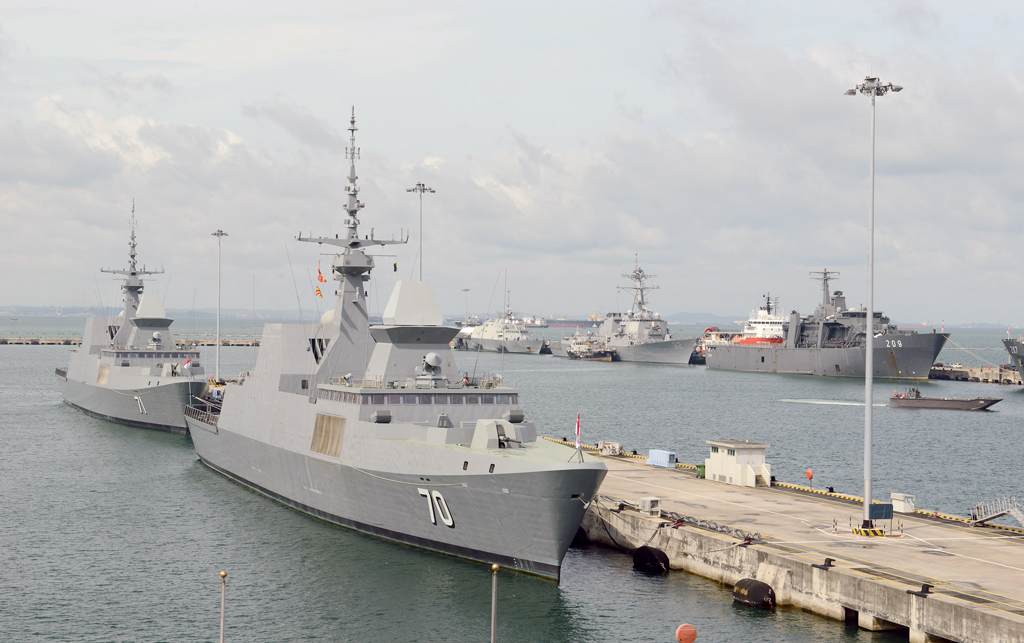
- Singapore and United States Navy warships at Changi Naval Base in 2015

Site information
- Type: Naval base
- Owner: Ministry of Defence (Singapore)
- Operator: Republic of Singapore Navy
- Controlled by: Republic of Singapore Navy
- Open to the public: Limited
- Website: mindef.gov.sg

Location
- Coordinates: 1°19′16″N 104°01′33″E
- Area: 86 ha (0.86 km^{2})

Site history
- Built: 2004; 22 years ago

Changi Naval Base (CNB), officially known as RSS Singapura – Changi Naval Base, is a naval base of the Republic of Singapore Navy (RSN). Located about 1.5 kilometres east of Changi Air Base (East) and 3.5 kilometres east of Singapore Changi Airport, the base was built on 1.28 km^{2} (0.49 sq mi) of reclaimed land. It was officially opened on 21 May 2004 by then Prime Minister of Singapore, Goh Chok Tong. A Navy Museum was opened at the entrance of the base in 2012.

== Overview ==
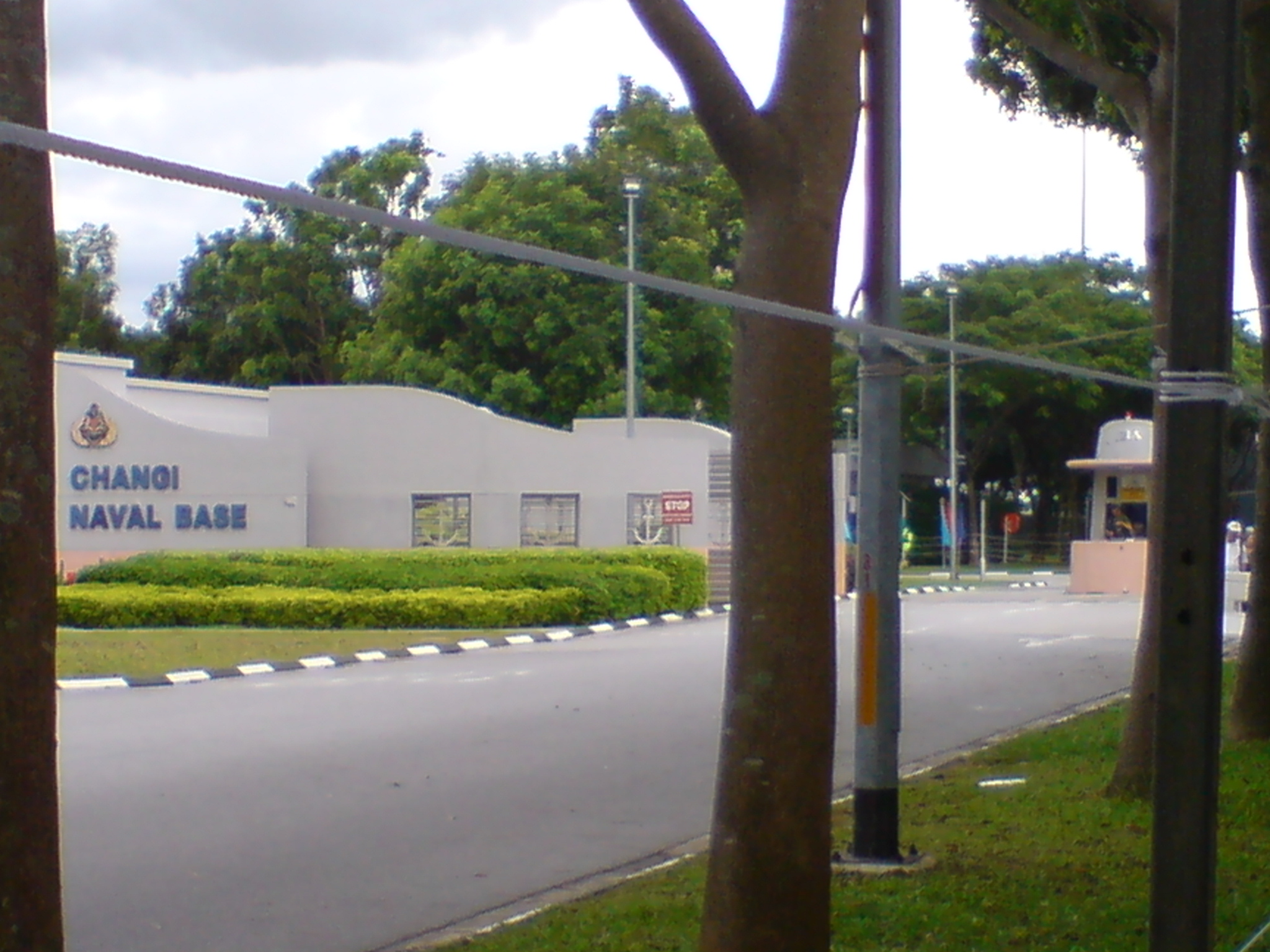
Entrance to Changi Naval Base (CNB) in 2007

Its 6.2 km (3.9 mi) berthing space can accommodate an aircraft carrier and is often used by visiting ships of the Royal Navy as part of the Five Power Defence Arrangements (FPDA) and United States Navy, as a result of the signing of the addendum to the 1990 United States–Singapore Memorandum of Understanding on 10 November 1990, which formalised arrangements for US Navy ships to use CNB facilities.

The Straits Times stated in an editorial that:

The US Navy uses Singapore's naval facilities for logistics and re-supply, while Singapore uses American airbases and abundant space for ground training.

In 2017, India and Singapore signed a bilateral agreement which will allow Indian Navy ships limited logistical support, including refuelling, at CNB.

== Design ==
Automation was incorporated into the design of CNB to reduce manpower requirements. It has an automated underground ammunition depot that allows ammunition to be loaded onto the ships and an automated warehouse system to store items. The base has a fibre-optic broadband network for information management. The base was also designed to be environment-friendly, with three small-scale wind turbines powering the 50 lights along the breakwaters at night. Conventional roof construction materials were substituted by 72 thin-film solar panels and the solar energy generated lights 100 downlights in the base. Seawater is used in the air-conditioning system, saving about 35,000 m^{3} (equivalent to 20 Olympic-sized pools) of potable water annually.

== Deployment ==
Currently, aircraft carriers, submarines, frigates, amphibious transport docks and missile gunboats are based at CNB. Co-located in CNB is the Changi Naval Training Base, also known as RSS Panglima—named in honour of the first ship of the Navy.
