= KDB Waspada =

Bruneian missile boat

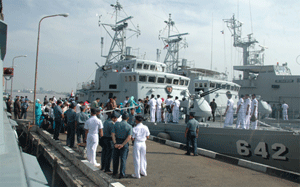
- KRI Salawaku (642) at Pontianak on 18 April 2011

History

Brunei
- Name: Waspada
- Namesake: Waspada
- Ordered: 16 March 1976
- Builder: Vosper Thornycroft, Singapore
- Launched: 1977
- Commissioned: 3 October 1978
- Decommissioned: 15 April 2011
- Home port: Muara, Brunei
- Identification: P-02

Indonesia
- Name: Salawaku
- Namesake: Salawaku
- Acquired: 15 April 2011
- Home port: Surabaya
- Identification: Pennant number: 642, 842
- Status: Active

General characteristics
- Class & type: Waspada-class fast attack craft
- Displacement: 206 tons (full load)
- Length: 121 ft (37 m)
- Draft: 6 ft (1.8 m)
- Propulsion: 2 MTU 20V 538 TB91 diesels
- Speed: 32 knots (59 km/h)
- Range: 1,200 nautical miles (2,200 km) at 14 knots (26 km/h)
- Complement: 4 officers, 20 enlisted
- Sensors & processing systems: Kelvin Hughes Type 1007 (surface search)
- Electronic warfare & decoys: Decca RDL ESM
- Armament: 2 x Oerlikon 30mm GCM-BO1; 2 x Aérospatiale Exocet MM38; 2 x M2 Browning

KDB Waspada (P-02) / KRI Salawaku (842) is the second ship of Waspada class built up in the late 1970s, one of three ordered in Singapore. She was launched in 1977, and was in service with the Royal Brunei Navy until 2011, when she was sold to the Indonesian Navy. She is currently active in Indonesia service as KRI Salawaku.

== Construction ==
Waspada was ordered in 1976. She was laid down by Vosper Thornycroft in Singapore and launched in 1977. She was commissioned in 1978.

== Description ==
KDB Waspada is a small missile boat, orientated to be a patrol boat. The overall length of this boat is 36.9 m, the width – 7.2 m and the draft – 1.8 m. The displacement tonnage is 150 or 206 tones (depending on the source). The ship is powered by two compression-ignition engines MTU 20V538 TB91 (9000 hp). Maximum quantity of the fuel she can take is 16 tones, consequently she can sail for 1,200 nautical miles at a speed of 14 knots.

She is armed with one twin mount for the Oerlikon 30-calibre GCM-B01 guns. The angle of this gun barrel is 85°, the weight of the projectile is 1 kg, the range is of 10 000 m and the rate of fire is 650 RPM. She is also equipped with two single M2 Browning and two launchers for MM38 Exocet anti-ship missiles.

== Service in Brunei ==
=== Exercise Pelican 1979 ===
Exercise Pelican 1979, the first ever joint naval exercise between Royal Brunei Navy and Republic of Singapore Navy. Waspada and KDB Seteria from Brunei and RSS Formidable and RSS Vigour.

=== Exercise Pelican 1997 ===
A joint exercise hosted by Royal Brunei Navy and Republic of Singapore Navy from 2 to 9 October 1997. Waspada, KDB Serasa, KDB Perwira, KDB Pemburu, KDB Seteria, RSS Vigilance, RSS Sea Tiger and RSS Courageous participated in the exercise.

=== CARAT 2004 ===
Waspada, Perwira, Pemburu, Seteria, USS Fort McHenry, USS McCampbell and USS Russell conducted a Cooperation Afloat Readiness and Training (CARAT) in the South China Sea on 24 June 2004.

=== Helang Laut 2008 ===
The Royal Brunei Navy and the Indonesian Navy conducted a 5 days exercise from 15–19 December 2008 called "Helang Laut". Seteria, Waspada, Pemburu and Serasa from Brunei and KRI Layang and KRI Singa from Indonesia participated in the exercise.

A major repair work was done before her decommissioning and sent to Indonesian service on 15 April 2011.

== Service in Indonesia ==
KRI Salawaku, along with KRI Badau were transferred to Indonesian Navy on 15 April 2011. They departed Bandar Seri Begawan and headed for Jakarta, with resupply stop in Pontianak on 18 April. During the journey they were escorted by KRI Kala Hitam (828). They were assigned with fast attack craft pennant number of 642 and 643 respectively. Later their numbers were changed to that of patrol vessel with 842 for Salawaku and 841 for Badau as their Exocet missiles were landed. Initially they were assigned to Western Fleet Command based at Jakarta, later they were moved to Eastern Fleet Command at Surabaya.

On 13 August 2014 at 10:35 UTC+8, KRI Salawaku evacuated the crew of a sinking coal barge-cleaner boat in the Barito River waters off Tabunganen District, Barito Kuala Regency, South Kalimantan. While sailing to Banjarmasin for resupply, Banjarmasin Naval Base informed Salawaku that there is a sinking boat with 5 people in the Barito River near Kaget Island. She then proceeded quickly to the designated area. On 11:05, she spotted 2 people hanging on to a floating barrel. Salawaku picked up the other 3 people, while the 2 that were on the barrel asked to be delivered to the nearest land. They were picked up by nearby traditional boats.

On 3 October 2016, Commander of Navy Main Base XIII/Tarakan First Admiral TNI Wahyudi H. Dwiyono confirmed that Salawaku was tasked with protecting Ambalat waters, including Unarang Reef in Nunukan Regency to ensure that there were no violations of maritime boundaries and smuggling through the lane route.

On 22 January 2019, Indonesian Navy Materials Service handed back five warships to II Fleet Command after they finished their regular maintenance. KRI Teluk Cenderawasih (533) and KRI Soputan (923) has finished their "depot-level thorough maintenance" (Hardepo), while KRI Oswald Siahaan (354), KRI Kerapu (811), and KRI Salawaku (842) has finished "thorough platform maintenance" (Harplatform)

== Gallery ==
KDB Waspada Gallery

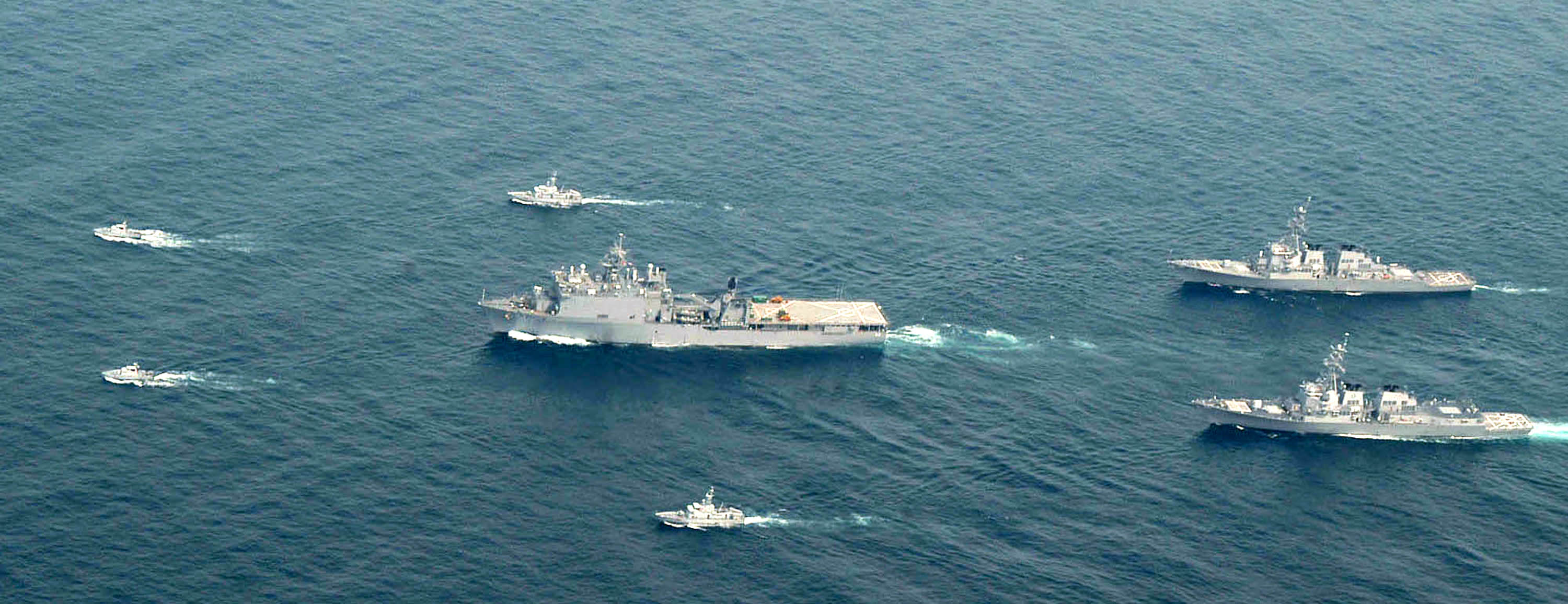
CARAT 2004
