= KDB Pejuang =

Bruneian missile boat

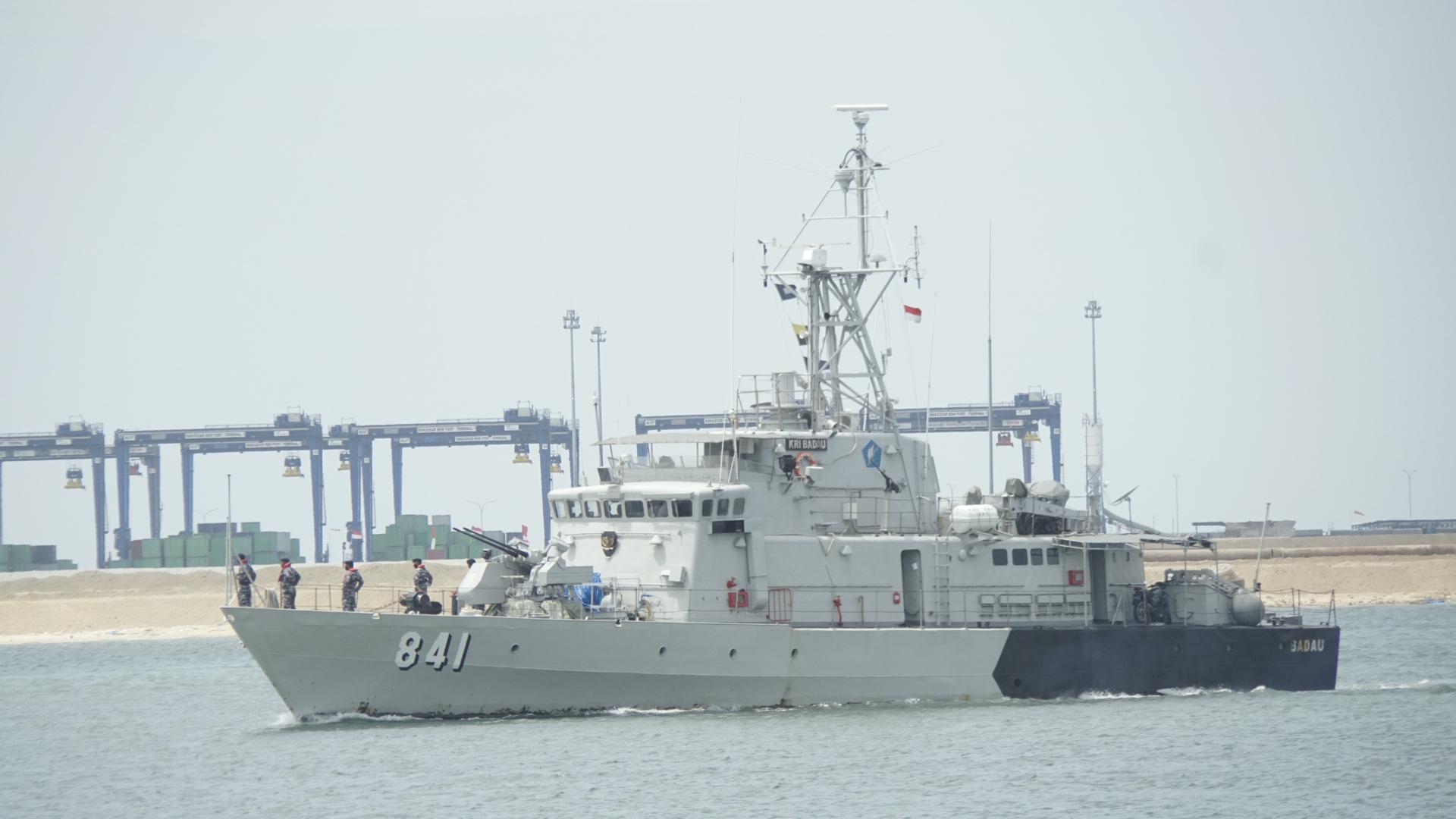
- KRI Badau on 30 September 2020

History

Brunei
- Name: Pejuang
- Namesake: Pejuang
- Ordered: 1976
- Builder: Vosper Thornycroft, Singapore
- Launched: 15 March 1978
- Commissioned: 25 March 1979
- Decommissioned: 15 April 2011
- Home port: Muara, Brunei
- Identification: P-03

Indonesia
- Name: Badau
- Namesake: Parang Badau, traditional weapon of Bangka Belitung
- Acquired: 15 April 2011
- Home port: Surabaya
- Identification: Pennant number: 643, 841
- Status: Active

General characteristics
- Class & type: Waspada-class fast attack craft
- Displacement: 206 tons (full load)
- Length: 121 ft (37 m)
- Draft: 6 ft (1.8 m)
- Propulsion: 2 MTU 20V 538 TB91 diesels
- Speed: 32 knots (59 km/h)
- Range: 1,200 nautical miles (2,200 km) at 14 knots (26 km/h)
- Complement: 4 officers, 20 enlisted
- Sensors & processing systems: Kelvin Hughes Type 1007 (surface search)
- Electronic warfare & decoys: Decca RDL ESM
- Armament: 2 x Oerlikon 30mm GCM-BO1; 2 x Aérospatiale Exocet MM38; 2 x M2 Browning

KDB Pejuang (P-03) / KRI Badau (841) is the second ship of Waspada class built up in the late 1970s, one of three ordered in Singapore. She was launched on 1978, and was in service with the Royal Brunei Navy until 2011, when she was sold to the Indonesian Navy. She is currently active in Indonesia service as KRI Badau.

== Construction ==
KDB Pejuang was ordered in 1976. She was laid down by Vosper Thornycroft in Singapore and launched on 15 March 1978. She was commissioned on 25 June 1979.

== Description ==
KDB Pejuang is a small missile boat, orientated to be a patrol boat. The overall length of this boat is 36.9 m, the width – 7.2 m and the draft – 1.8 m. The displacement tonnage is 150 or 206 tones (depending on the source). The ship is powered by two compression-ignition engines MTU 20V538 TB91 (9000 hp). Maximum quantity of the fuel she can take is 16 tones, consequently she can sail for 1,200 nautical miles at a speed of 14 knots.

She is armed with one twin mount for the Oerlikon 30-calibre GCM-B01 guns. The angle of this gun barrel is 85°, the weight of the projectile is 1 kg, the range is of 10 000 m and the rate of fire is 650 RPM. She is also equipped with two single M2 Browning and two launchers of anti-ship missiles MM38 Exocet.

== Service in Brunei ==
His Royal Highness Prince General Haji Al-Muhtadee Billah went aboard KDB Pejuang to see a presentation and tour around the operations room by the Fleet Commander in 2008. A major repair work was done before her decommissioning and sent to Indonesian service on 15 April 2011.

== Service in Indonesia ==
KRI Badau, along with KRI Salawaku were transferred to Indonesian Navy on 15 April 2011. They departed Bandar Seri Begawan and headed for Jakarta, with resupply stop in Pontianak on 18 April. During the journey they were escorted by KRI Kala Hitam (828). They were assigned with fast attack craft pennant number of 643 and 642 respectively. Later their numbers were changed to that of patrol vessel with 842 for Salawaku and 841 for Badau as their Exocet missiles were landed. Initially they were assigned to Western Fleet Command based at Jakarta, later they were moved to Eastern Fleet Command at Surabaya.

In April 2016, together with KRI Slamet Riyadi (352), Badau were deployed to the border with Philippines after a report of a hijacking of two Indonesian ships, supposedly by Abu Sayyaf group.

In 2017, the commander of KRI Badau was handed over to Sea Major (P) Pulung Nugroho.
