= Waspada-class fast attack craft =

Class of fast attack craft built for the Royal Brunei Navy

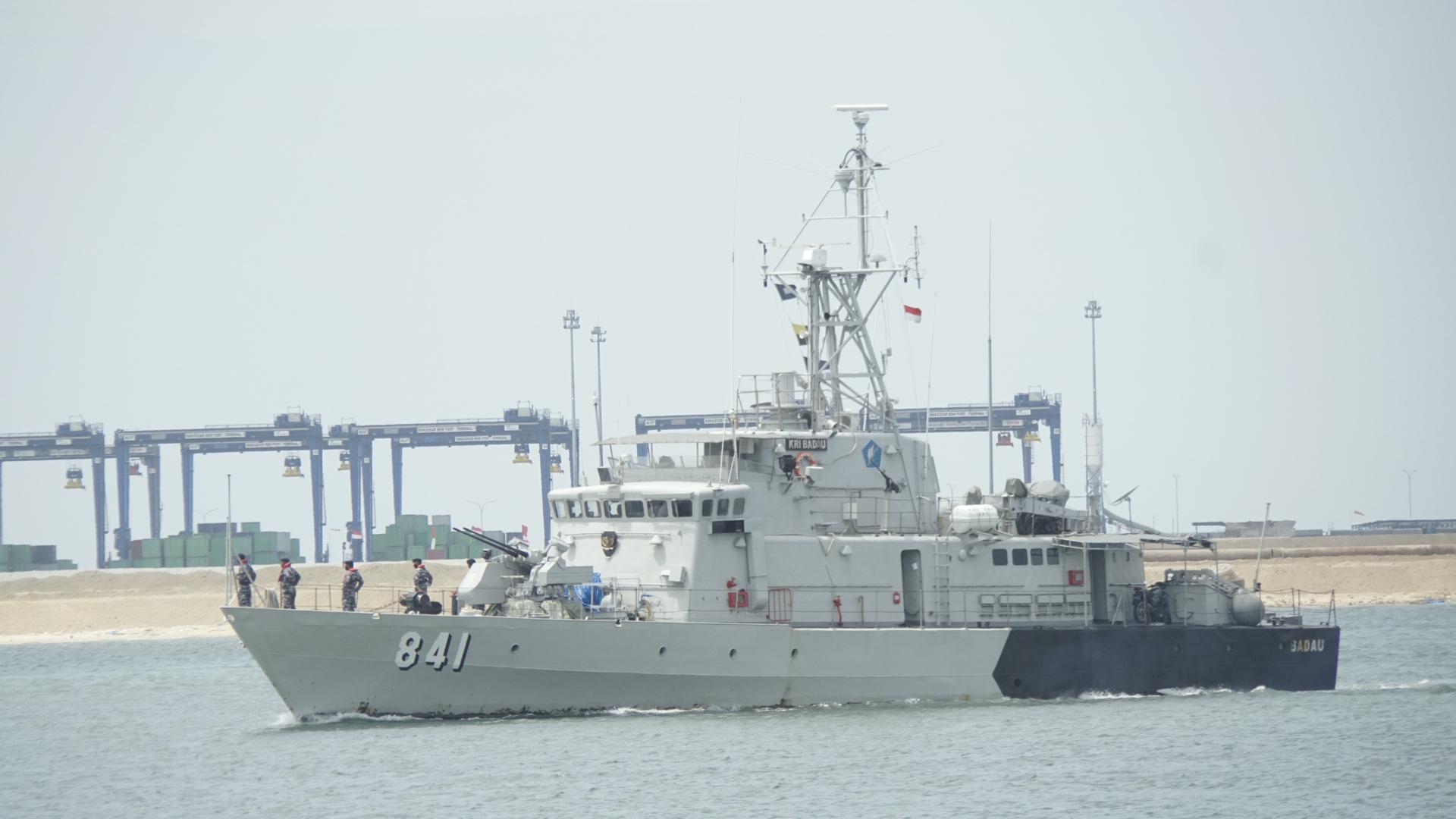
- Indonesian KRI Badau at Makassar in 2020

Class overview
- Builders: Vosper Thornycroft, Singapore
- Operators: Royal Brunei Navy; Indonesian Navy
- Preceded by: Perwira class; Saleha class; Bendeharu class
- Succeeded by: Darussalam-class offshore patrol vessel; Ijtihad-class patrol boat
- In commission: 1978–present
- Completed: 3
- Active: 3

General characteristics
- Type: Fast attack craft
- Displacement: 206 tons (full load)
- Length: 121 ft (37 m)
- Draft: 6 ft (1.8 m)
- Propulsion: 2 x MTU 20V 538 TB91 diesels
- Speed: 32 knots (59 km/h)
- Range: 1,200 nautical miles (2,200 km) at 14 knots (26 km/h)
- Complement: 4 officers, 20 enlisted
- Sensors & processing systems: Kelvin Hughes Type 1007 (surface search); Radamec 2500 Electro-Optic Director (modernization); BAe Sea Archer Weapon Control System
- Electronic warfare & decoys: Decca RDL ESM
- Armament: 1 x Oerlikon 30 mm GCM-A03-2 twin gun; 2 x M2 Browning; 2 x Aérospatiale Exocet MM38

The Waspada class is a class of fast attack craft that was built for the Royal Brunei Navy by Vosper Thornycroft in the late 1970s. Three vessels were built, and as of 2009 all three remain in service.

In 2011 it was announced that Brunei would donate KDB Waspada and KDB Pejuang to Indonesia as patrol crafts and training vessels.

== Ships of class ==
Pennant number	Name	Builder	Launched	Commissioned	Status
P-02	KRI Salawaku (ex-Waspada)	Vosper Thornycroft	1977	1978	Active
P-03	KRI Badau (ex-Pejuang)	Vosper Thornycroft	1978	1979	Active
P-04	KDB Seteria	Vosper Thornycroft	1978	1979	Active
