= Darussalam-class offshore patrol vessel =

Largest class of warship in the Royal Brunei Navy

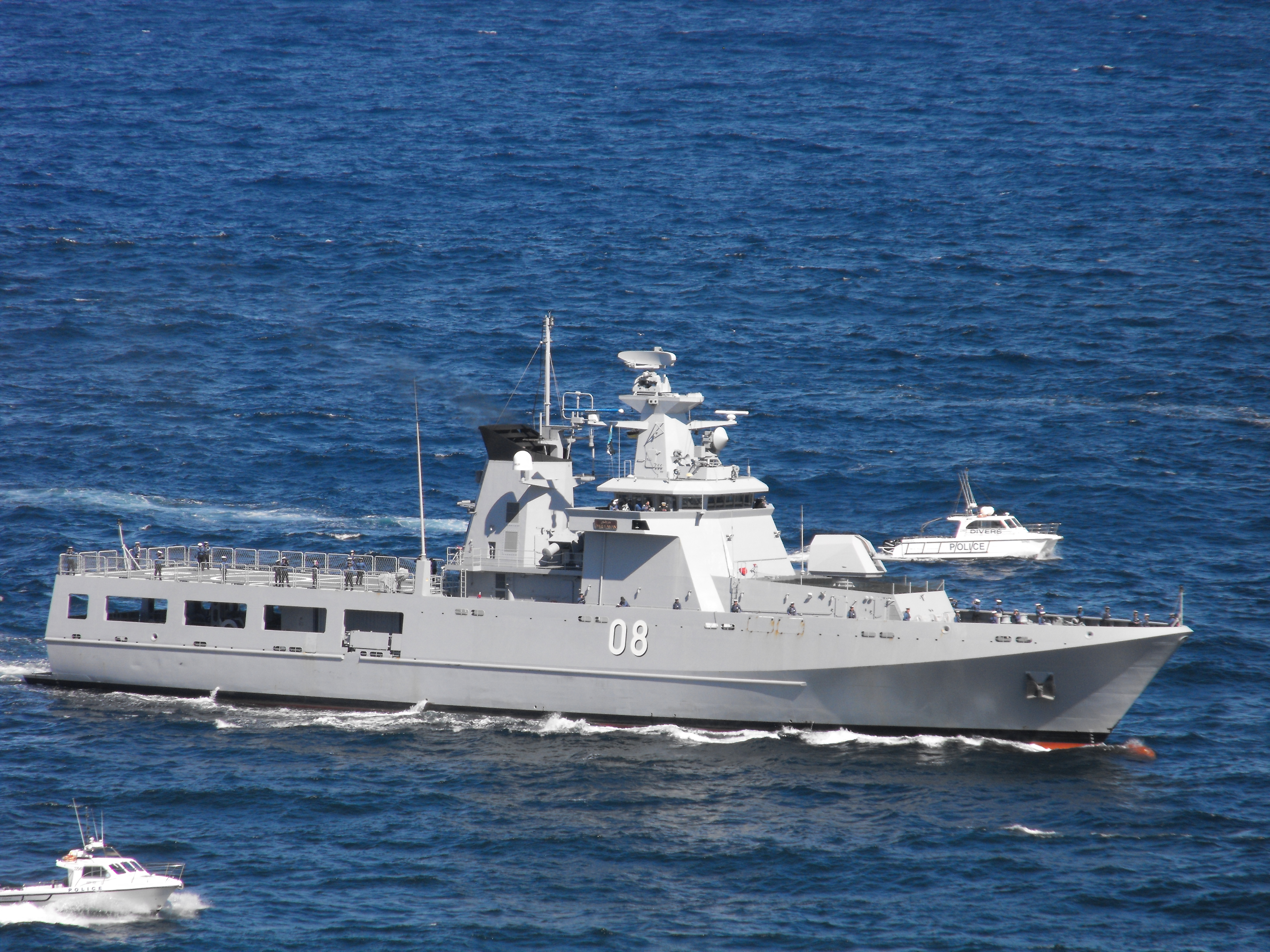
- KDB Darulaman (08) at the Royal Australian Navy International Fleet Review 2013.

Class overview
- Name: Darussalam class
- Builders: Lürssen Werft, Germany
- Operators: Royal Brunei Navy
- Preceded by: Waspada class
- Subclasses: Arafura class
- In service: 2011 – present
- In commission: 7 May 2011; 15 years ago
- Planned: 4
- Completed: 4
- Active: 4

General characteristics
- Type: offshore patrol vessel
- Displacement: 1,625 tonnes (1,791 tons)
- Length: 80 metres (262 feet)
- Beam: 13 metres (43 feet)
- Installed power: 2× MTU 8,500 kW (11,400 shp) V12 diesel engines
- Speed: 22 kn (41 km/h; 25 mph) maximum
- Range: 7,500 nmi (13,890 km; 8,631 mi)
- Endurance: 21 days
- Boats & landing craft carried: 2× Boomeranger boats; 1× Boomeranger patrol craft (1× 7.62mm gun)
- Crew: 55+
- Sensors & processing systems: Search radar: Terma Scanter 4100; Fire control radar: Thales Sting EO Mk2; Navigation radar: 2× Furuno navigation radar; EOTS: atop mast, front of search radar
- Electronic warfare & decoys: ESM: EDO ITT 3601; Decoy: Terma DL-6T decoy launching system
- Armament: Guns: Maingun for ship 06, 07, & 08: 1× Bofors 57 mm Mk3 gun; Maingun for ship 09: 1× MLG 27 cannon; 2× Oerlikon 20mm/85 KAA secondary guns; Missiles: 4× Exocet MM40 Block 3 (except ship 09)
- Aircraft carried: 1× helicopter
- Aviation facilities: helicopter landing platform
- Notes: no helicopters are permanently embarked

The Darussalam-class offshore patrol vessels are a class of four offshore patrol vessels constructed for the Royal Brunei Navy (RBN; Malay: Tentera Laut Diraja Brunei, TLDB). They are the largest and most capable ships of the Royal Brunei Navy, and often participate in international naval exercises. The lead ship in the class is KDB Darussalam (06).

== Development ==
=== Nakhoda Ragam contract dispute ===
Prior to the Darussalam-class, three Nakhoda Ragam-class corvettes were built to order by BAE Systems Marine (now BAE Systems Maritime – Naval Ships) in the United Kingdom for the Royal Brunei Navy (RBN). The contract was awarded to GEC-Marconi in 1995, and the ships, a variant of the F2000 design, were launched in January 2001, June 2001 and June 2002, at the then BAE Systems Marine yard at Scotstoun, Glasgow in Scotland. Brunei refused to accept the three Nakhoda Ragam-class corvettes from BAE Systems. The contract dispute became subject to arbitration, and was ultimately settled in BAE System's favour. The vessels were handed over to Royal Brunei Technical Services (RBTS) in June 2007. In 2007, Brunei contracted the German Lürssen Werft shipyard to find a new customer for the three ships, and the ships were eventually purchased by Indonesia.

=== Offshore patrol vessel programme ===
Brunei ordered the Darussalam-class offshore patrol vessels (OPV) from Lürssen Werft, the same company that Brunei contracted to sell the disputed Nakhoda Ragam-class corvettes. Keel laying for the first two vessels of this new class took place on 26 June 2009 at Lürssen shipyard in Germany. The first tranche of two vessels were launched 12 November 2010 and delivered to the Royal Brunei Navy in January 2011. The first two were jointly commissioned by the Sultan of Brunei, Hassanal Bolkiah on 7 May 2011; 15 years ago. The second subsequent tranche of two vessels were delivered two phases, the final vessel arriving in Brunei in 2014.

== Ships in class ==
Darussalam-class vessels
| pennant no. | name | MMSI | call sign | builder | launched | commissioned | status |
|---|---|---|---|---|---|---|---|
| 06 | KDB Darussalam | 508111122 | V8DE | Lurssen Werft, Bremen-Vegesack | 12 Nov 2010 | 7 May 2011 | commissioned |
| 07 | KDB Darulehsan | 508111123 | V8DF | Lurssen Werft, Bremen-Vegesack | 12 Nov 2010 | 7 May 2011 | commissioned |
| 08 | KDB Darulaman | 508111124 | V8DG | Lurssen Werft, Bremen-Vegesack | | 12 Aug 2011 | commissioned |
| 09 | KDB Daruttaqwa | 508211110 | V8DL | Lurssen Werft, Bremen-Vegesack | | 8 Sep 2014 | commissioned |

== See also ==
- List of Royal Brunei Navy ships
- List of naval ship classes in service

== Gallery ==
gallery of images of Darussalam-class offshore patrol vessels
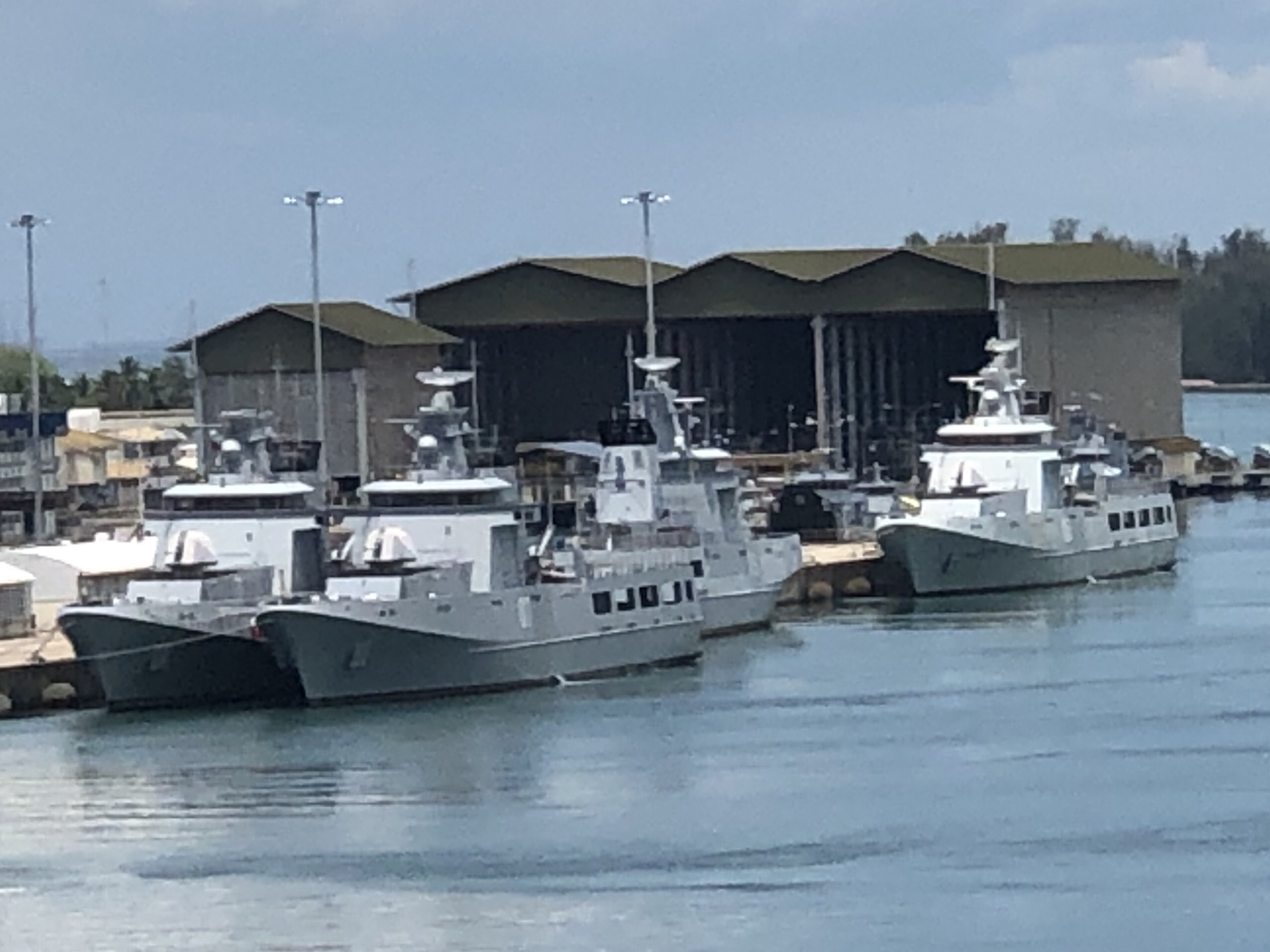
KDB Darulehsan (07) and KDB Darussalam (06) moored alongside their two sisters in port at Muara Naval Base.

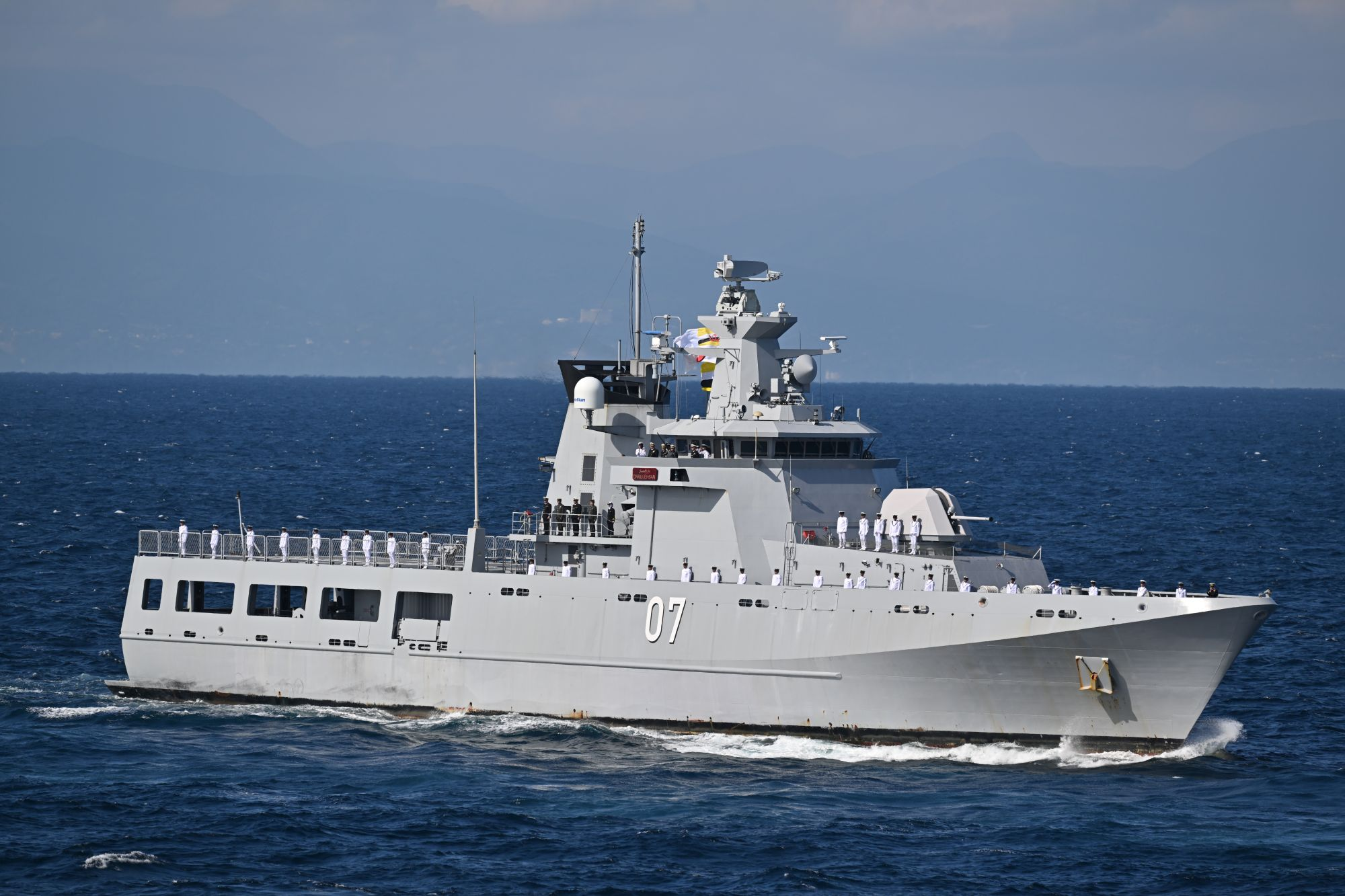
KDB Darulehsan (07) participating in the Japan International Fleet Review 2022.

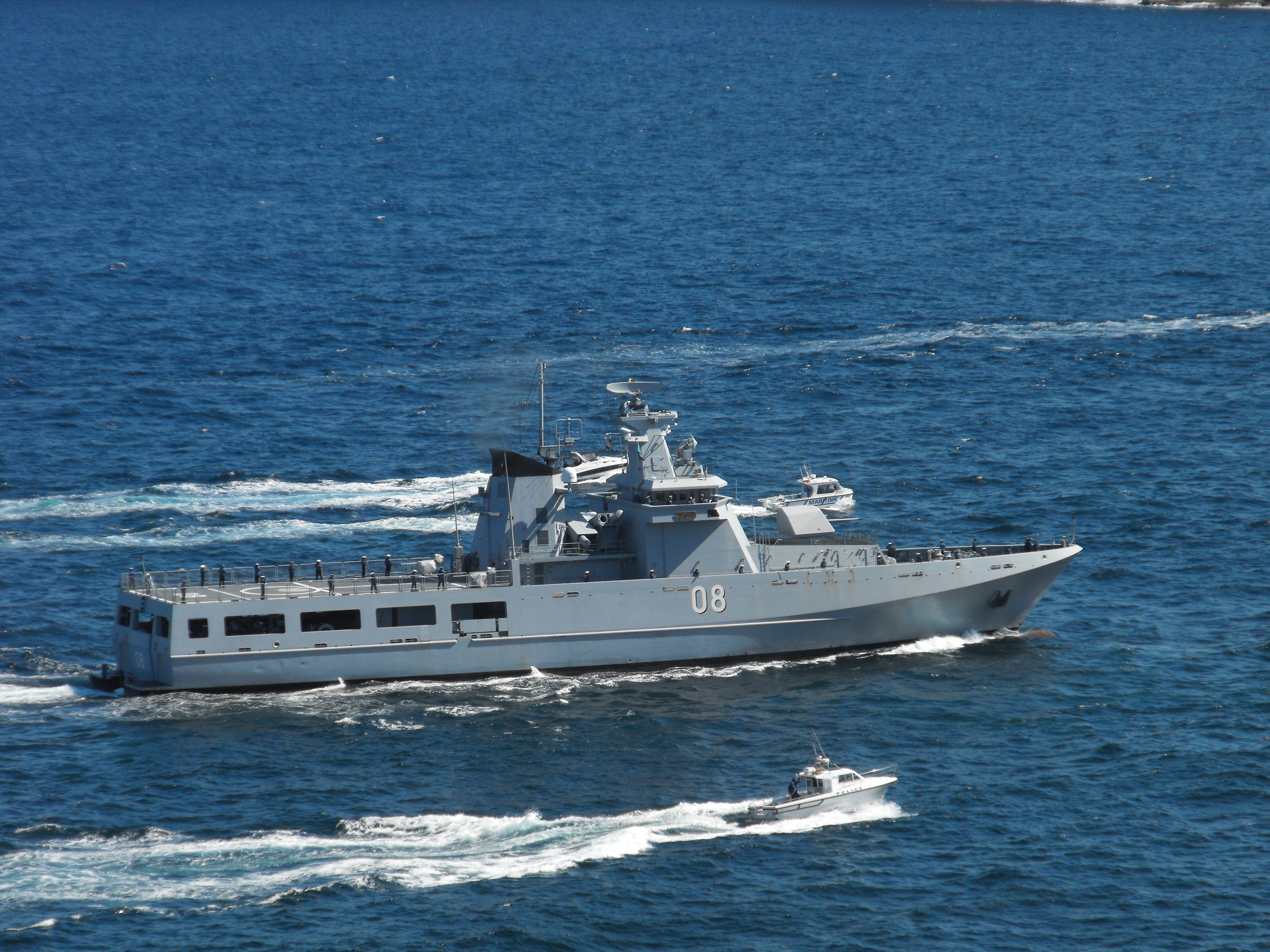
KDB Darulaman (08) at the Sydney International Fleet Review.

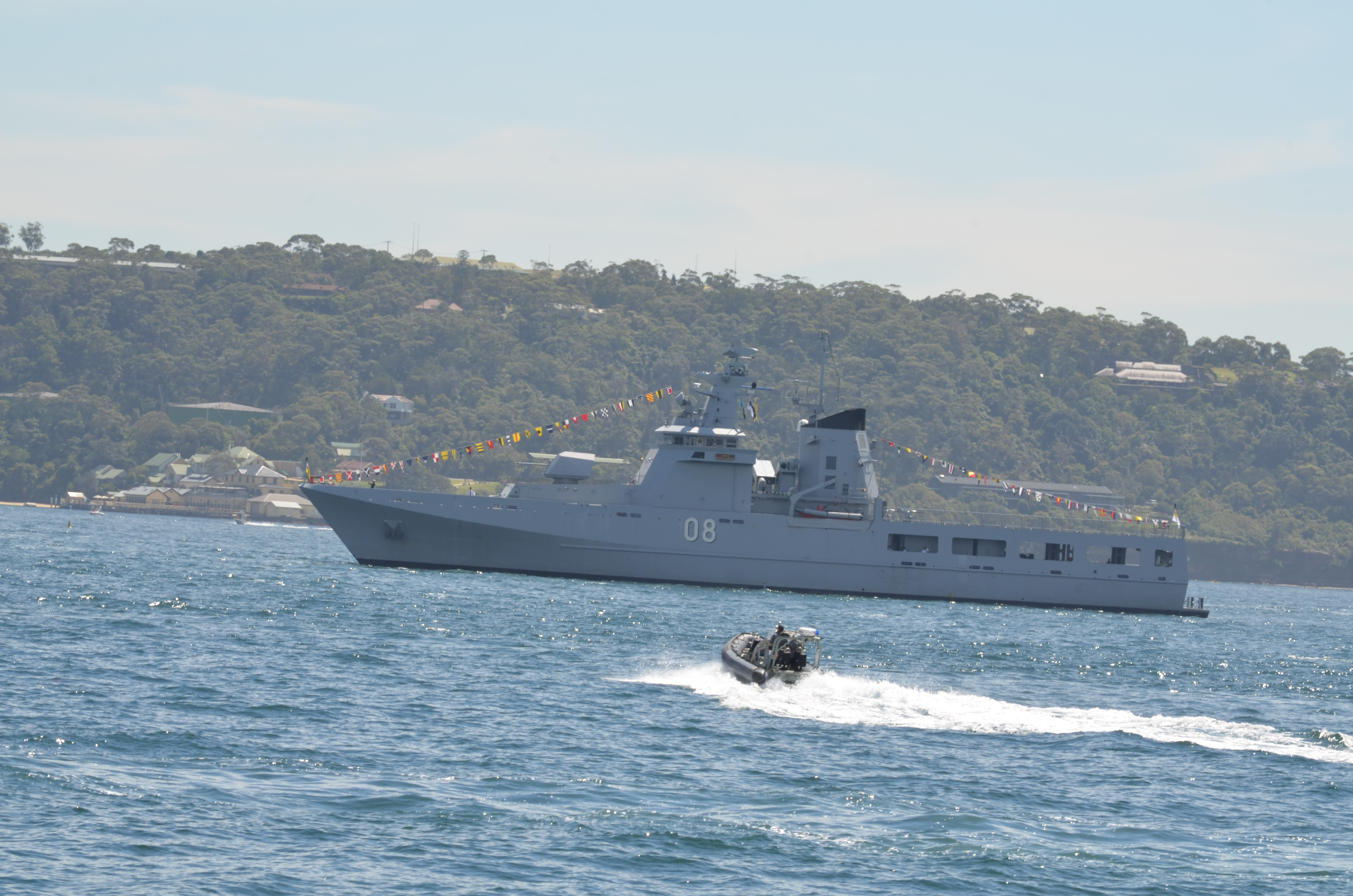
KDB Darulaman (08) at the Sydney International Fleet Review at anchor.

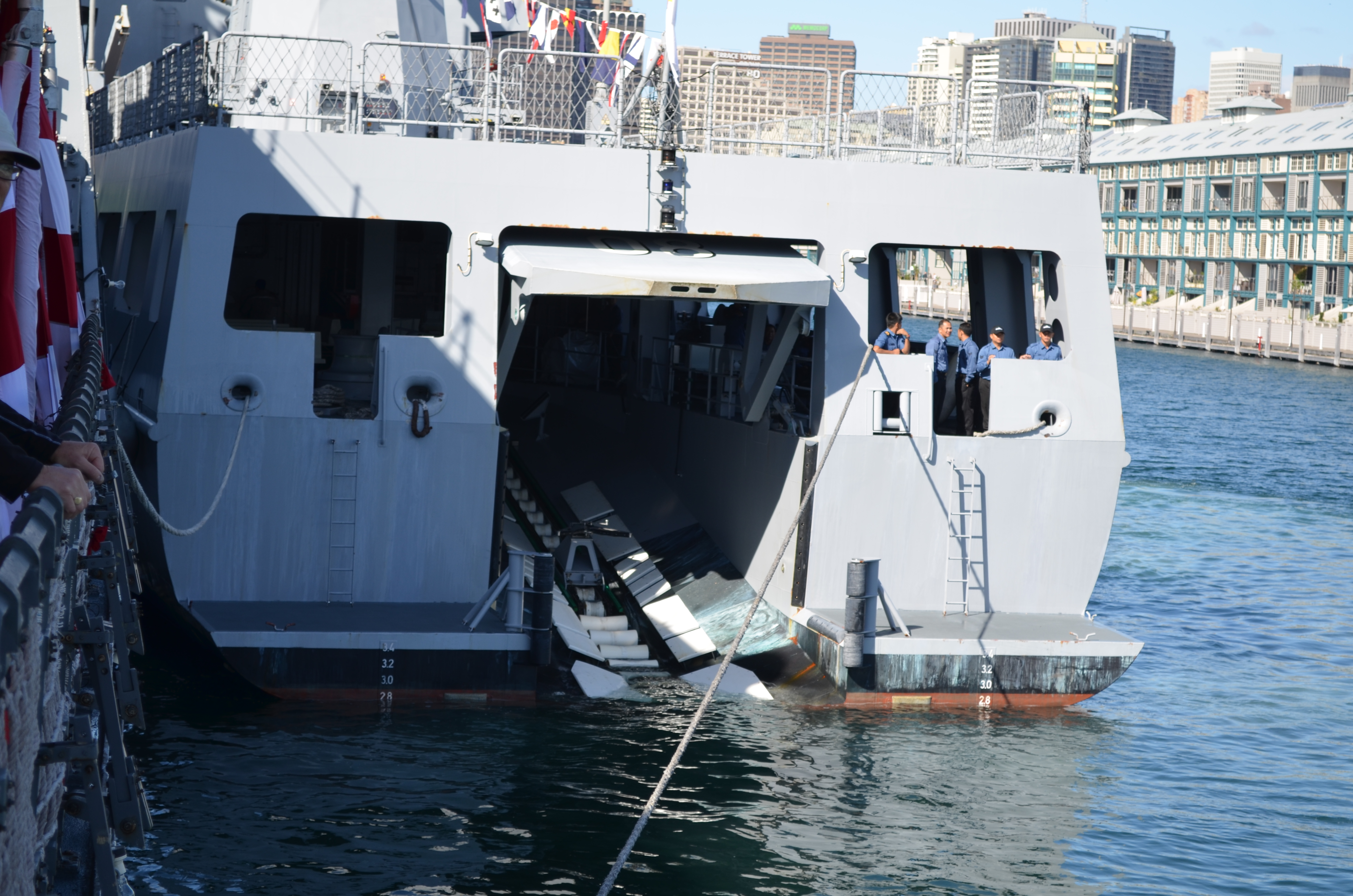
KDB Darulaman (08) at the Sydney International Fleet Review, demonstrating open RHIB dock.

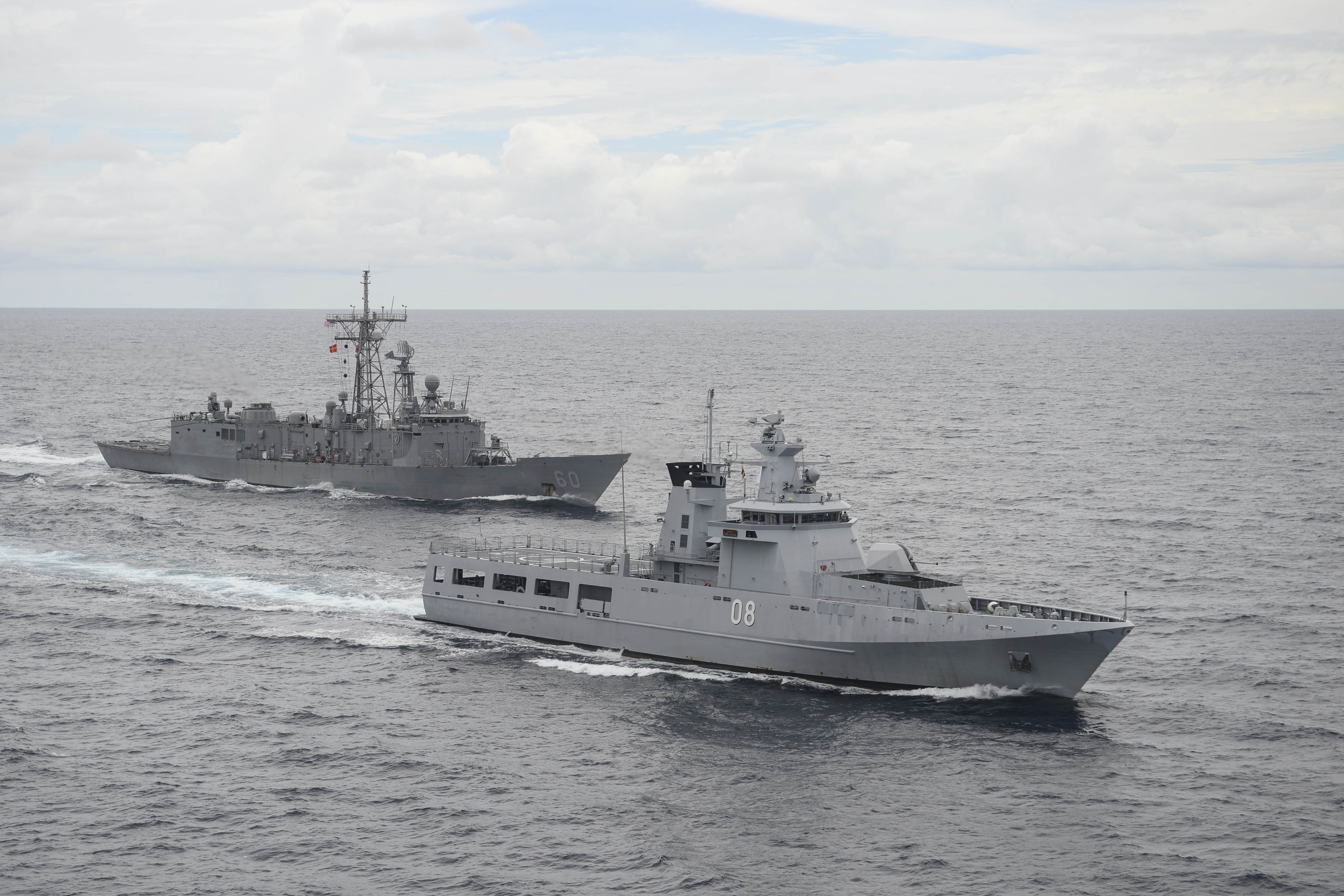
KDB Darulaman (08) leads USS Rodney M. Davis during CARAT 2014.

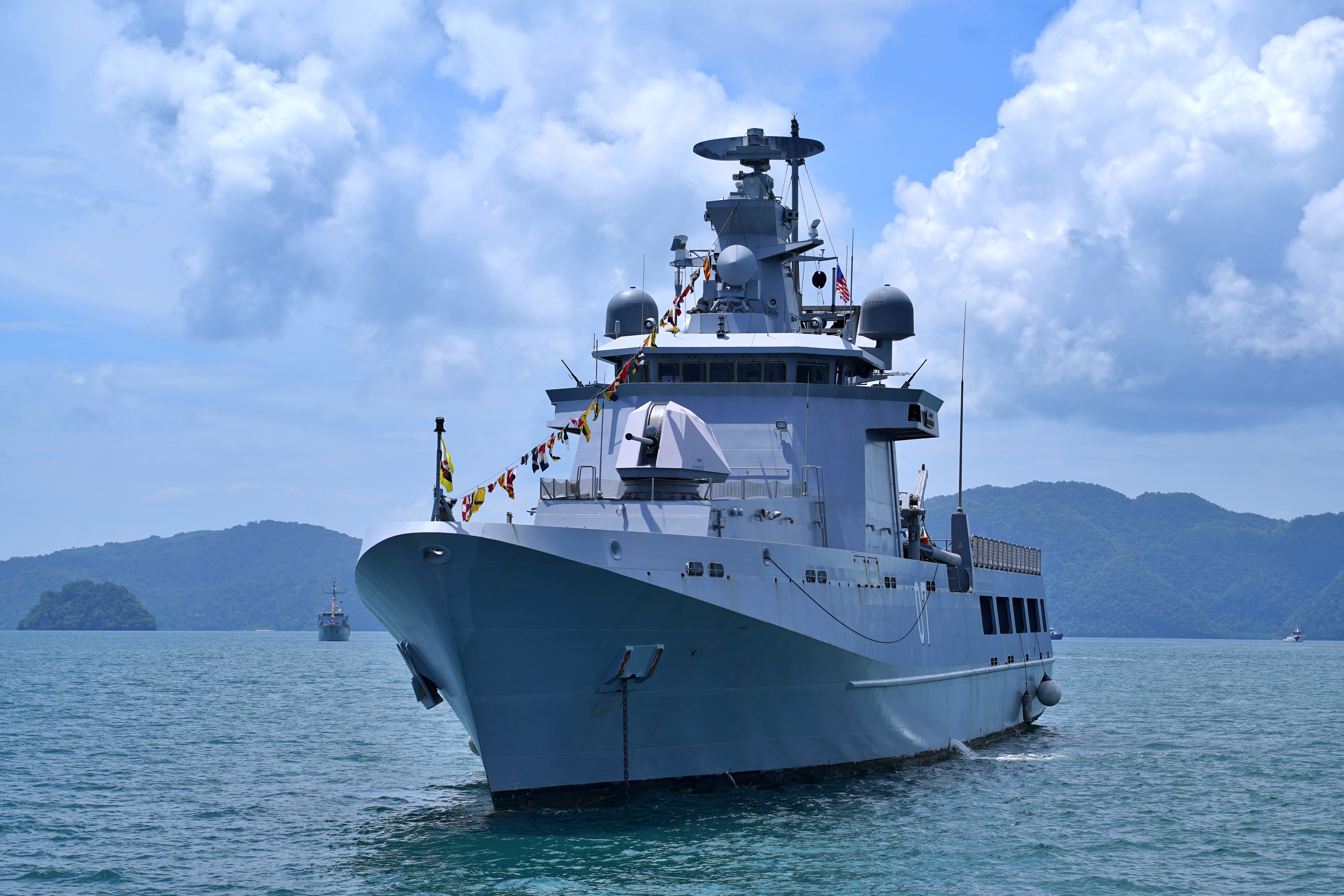
KDB Darulehsan (07) in Langkawi 2023.
