= Fleet Command (disambiguation) =

Fleet Command is a naval warfare simulation computer game released in 1999 by Electronic Arts.

Fleet Command may also refer to:

- Fleet Command (Australia)
- Fleet Command (SA Navy)
- Fleet Command (Turkey)

== See also ==
- Fleet Commander (disambiguation)
