= Royal Brunei Navy =

Maritime warfare branch of the military of Brunei Darussalam

- Malay: Tentera Laut Diraja Brunei; Jawi: تنترا لاوت ديراجا بروني
- Badge of Royal Brunei Navy
- Founded: 1 October 1991 (35 years) (in current form) 14 June 1965 (61 years, 4 months) (as the Boat Section)
- Country: Brunei
- Type: Navy
- Role: Naval warfare Search and rescue Law enforcement
- Part of: Royal Brunei Armed Forces
- Headquarters: Muara Naval Base, Brunei-Muara, Brunei
- Anniversaries: 14 June
- Equipment: See list
- Website: navy.mindef.gov.bn

Commanders
- Commander: First Admiral Sahibul Bahari, RBN
- Deputy Commander: Captain Mohammad Azrin , RBN
- Fleet Commander: Captain Sonny Iskandar Rasani, RBN
- Chief of Staff: Captain Mohammad Faizal Ezam Abas, RBN
- Sergeant Major: Warrant Officer 1 Mohammad Nasri Ladis, RBN

Insignia
- Naval ensign

- Naval jack

The Royal Brunei Navy (RBN), natively known as Tentera Laut Diraja Brunei (TLDB) is the naval force of Brunei. It is a small but relatively well-equipped military force whose main responsibility is to conduct search and rescue missions, and to deter and defend the Brunei waters against attack mounted by seaborne forces.

The forerunner of the RBN was established on 14 June 1965, the second unit created after the formation of the Royal Brunei Armed Forces (RBAF). The RBN is based and headquartered at Muara Naval Base, 4 kilometres (2 miles) from Muara Town, with the majority of the enlisted sailors being Malays. Since 1977, the RBN has been equipped with missile gun boats and other coastal patrol craft. All the ships names are prefixed KDB, as in Kapal Diraja Brunei (Royal Brunei Ship in Malay). Captain Haji Mohamad Sarif Pudin has been acting commander of the RBN since 30 December 2022, succeeding First Admiral Pengiran Dato Seri Pahlawan Norazmi who was appointed the RBN 12th commander on 13 March 2015. The annual anniversary ceremony of RBN's inception was place on 14 June every year.

== History ==
=== Early years ===
The fourth anniversary parade was celebrated on 31 May 1965, and the unit was thereafter dubbed the Royal Brunei Malay Regiment (RBMR). Additionally, Sultan Hassanal Bolkiah declared that the regiment will shortly be outfitted with swift patrol boats, armoured vehicles, helicopters, and hovercraft. The Boat Section was formed on 14 June 1965, four years after the formation of the RBMR. Its manning strength was only eighteen personnel, including one officer from the First Battalion who had attended a basic military course in Federation of Malaya in 1961 until 1964. Important military equipment, including motor gunboats, helicopters, and hovercraft, was acquired in 1966. On 12 March 1966, a Borneo Bulletin Report said that the RBMR was the only infantry unit in the world to get a modern SR.N5 hovercraft for use in combat. The Boat Section was equipped with a number of aluminium boats (natively known as Temuai) and fast assault boats (FABs). The role of the section was solely to provide transportation of infantry elements to the interior of Brunei.

As the organisation expanded with the aid of stable economic growth, the Boat Section was renamed the Boat Company in 1966. The company received three river patrol boats in 1966, consisted of KDB Bendahara, KDB Maharajalela, and KDB Kermaindera. All the ships were crewed by locals and led by a qualified commanding officer. As the RBMR's strength increased in 1967, things started to happen quickly. Vosper Limited of Portsmouth, UK, produced the fast patrol boat KDB Pahlawan, which was put into service. In 1968, the strength of the Boat Company was enhanced with Westland Saunders Roe SR.N6 hovercraft. The first fast patrol craft was accepted in 1968 and named KDB Pahlawan. It became the first flagship for the Boat Company.

The Boat Company was reorganised as the First Flotilla, RBMR, or natively known as Angkatan Laut Pertama, Askar Melayu Diraja Brunei (ALP AMDB). While visiting the Muara Base in 1969 to observe an air and sea rescue exercise, retired Sultan Omar Ali Saifuddien III hoisted the new ensign created for the flotilla under the command of the KDB Pahlawan, which was initially launched in December 1966 by then Crown Princess Saleha.

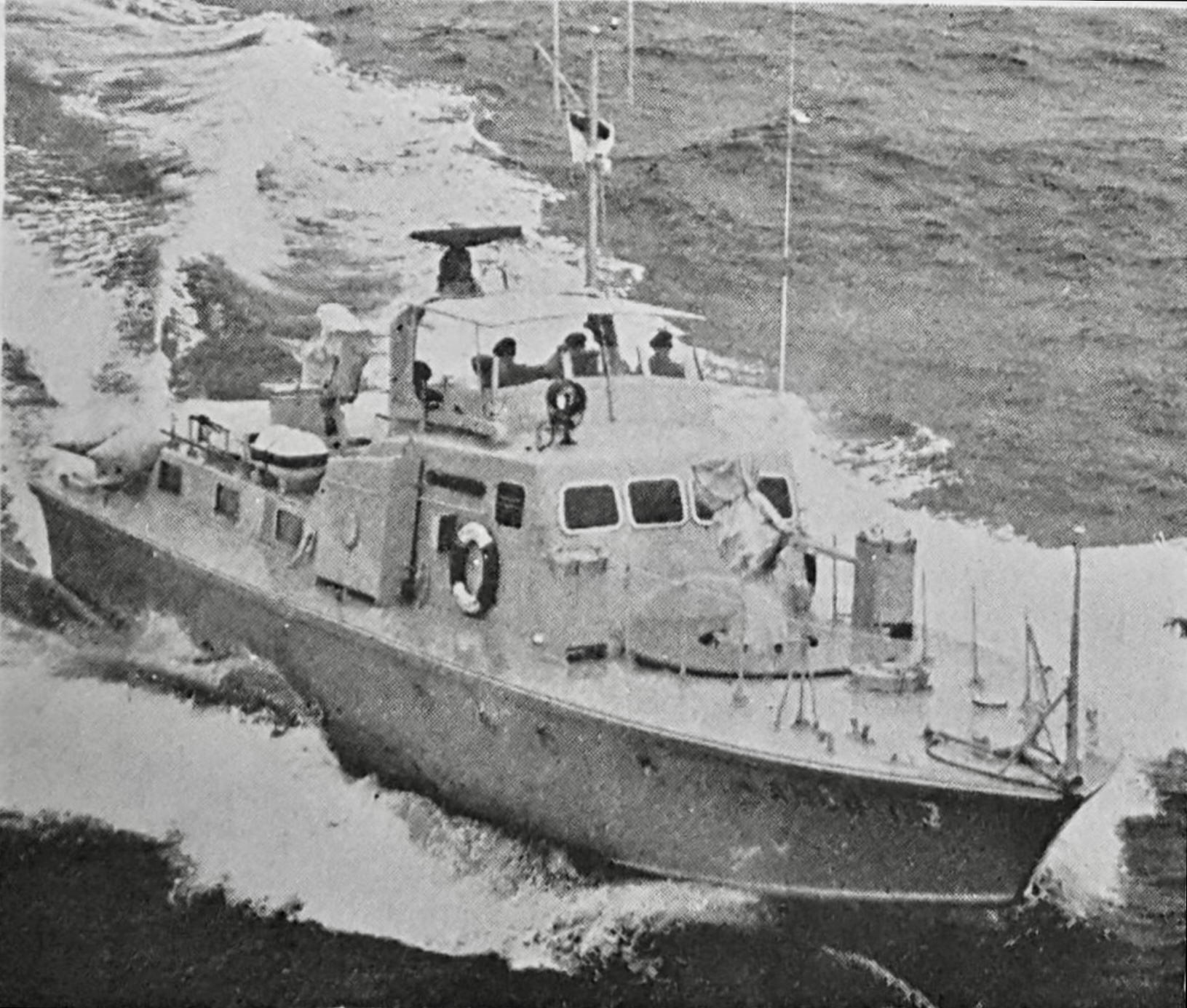
KDB Saleha in 1971

During that time, the estimated strength of the First Flotilla was forty-two personnel, including an officer, while assets consisted of one fast patrol craft, three river patrol boats, two hovercraft vessels, FABs, a few long boats, and Temuai. KDB Saleha and KDB Masna, named after Princess Masna, were purchased in 1970; however, they didn't arrive in Brunei until 26 January 1971. With a peak speed of 25 knots (46 km/h; 29 mph), the wooden-hulled boats were outfitted with light machine guns on the bridge and Oerlikon 20 mm cannons fore and aft. A revised 1971 Brunei-UK Agreement transferred all internal security responsibilities from Britain to the Sultanate, with the UK solely being accountable for Brunei's exterior defense. The SR.N6 hovercraft was acquired in the same year. Under the new Army Enactment, new service regulations went into effect on 1 June 1971.

The British Army's tri-service regulations, which addressed offenses in the air force, navy, and army as well, served as the model for the new disciplinary regulations. The flagship KDB Pahlawan, which was acquired by the RBMR Sea Wing in 1976, was instrumental in enabling the British-officered Brunei flotilla to become the most formidable indigenous naval group in the northwest Bruneian waterways. Equipped with surface-to-surface missiles, the KDB Waspada, constructed in Singapore, was added to the fleet in 1978. Additionally, the flotilla located in Muara served well in counter-infiltration strategies against smaller warships.

=== Post-Independence ===
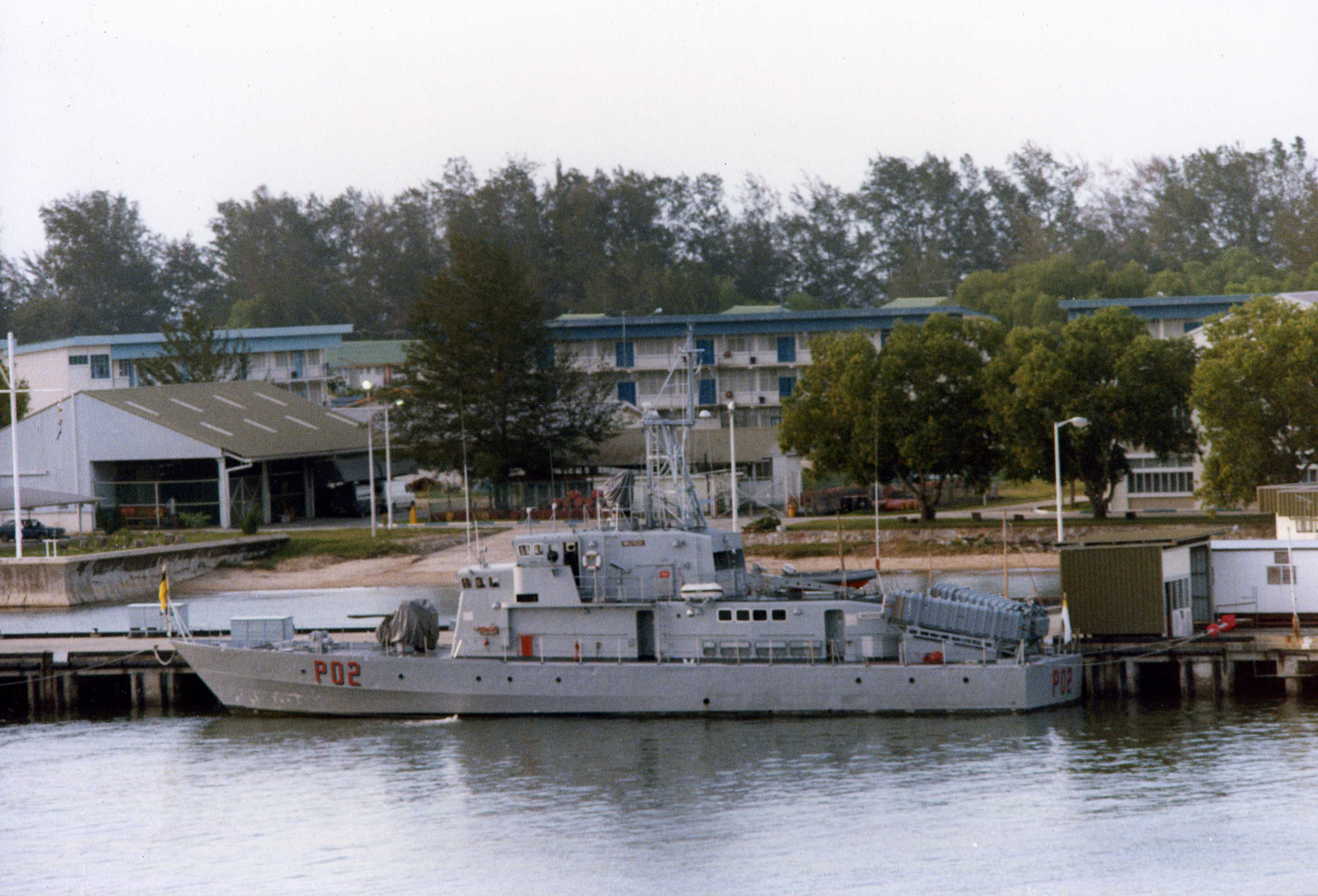
KDB Waspada docked at Muara Naval Base in 1985

Before being taken out of service in 1980, the Bendahara-class parol boats saw service for more than fourteen years. The RBMR was renamed as the Royal Brunei Armed Forces (RBAF), or Angkatan Bersenjata Diraja Brunei, on 1 January 1984, as part of an attempt to reform the armed forces following independence. Since 1984, the flotilla also maintained its routine maritime training exercises with the Royal Malaysian Navy, the Republic of Singapore Navy, and the Royal Thai Navy. As Brunei's military forces grew, the First Flotilla was renamed again on 1 October 1991, becoming the Royal Brunei Navy (RBN). The RBAF was reorganised in 1991 as a result of Bruneian government's emphasis on the exclusive economic zone (EEZ), which is recognized by the United Nations Convention on the Law of the Sea governing maritime regulations and is enforced by numerous nations due to the growing significance of the maritime boundary issue.

The Royal Brunei Navy aimed to undergo a large-scale modernisation, with the upgrading of the Muara Naval Base, and the purchase of three British-built corvettes from BAE Systems Naval Ships, Scotland. The ships were armed with MBDA Exocet Block II anti-ship missiles and MBDA Seawolf surface-to-air missiles. The contract was awarded to GEC-Marconi in 1995: the Nakhoda Ragam-class corvette were launched in January 2001, June 2001, and June 2002, at the then BAE Systems Marine yard at Scotstoun. These were completed but not delivered from BAE Systems Naval Ships in Scotstoun due to claims by the RBN that the ships fail to meet the required specifications; though opinion in the shipyard was that they were too complex for a small navy to operate. The contract dispute became the subject of arbitration. When the dispute was settled in favour of BAE Systems, the vessels were handed over to Royal Brunei Technical Services (RBTS) in June 2007.

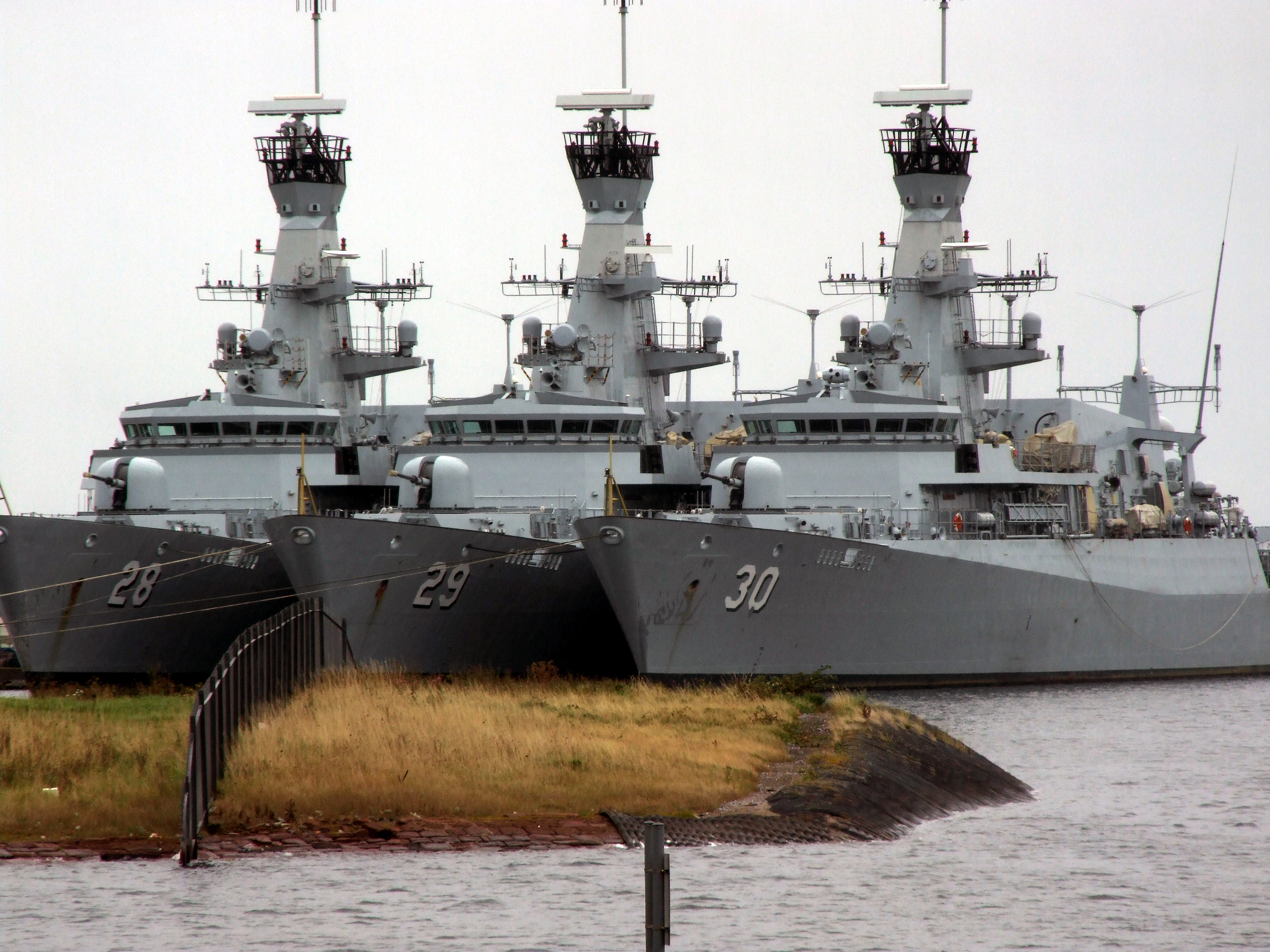
Nakhoda Ragam-class corvettes at Barrow-in-Furness in 2007

In 2007, Brunei contracted the German Lürssen shipyard to find a new customer for the three ships, though by 2011 the vessels remained unsold and laid up at Barrow-in-Furness. These ships were eventually purchased in 2013 by the Indonesian Navy for £380 million, or half of the original unit cost, and renamed Bung Tomo-class corvette. KDB Darussalam and KDB Darulehsan are two new Darussalam-class offshore patrol vessel (OPVs) that Brunei purchased for the RBN at the beginning of 2011. Launched on 6 January 2011, KDB Darulaman, the third Darussalam-class OPV, was the first to be put into the water for its acceptance testing in the harbour and at sea before to its August 2011 delivery date.

Exercise SEAGULL 03-07 was held in Brunei from 2 to 10 September 2007, between the RBN and their Philippine Navy (PN) counterparts. Participating ships include the PN corvette BRP Rizal (PS-74) and patrol gunboat BRP Federico Martir (PG-385), and RBN ships KDB Pejuang, KDB Seteria, KDB Perwira, and KDB Penyerang. They conducted series of drills, including mine clearance, under-water operations, replenishment at sea, night encounter exercise, boarding exercise, and other naval tactical exercises. The four 41 metres (135 ft) Ijtihad-class patrol boats (KDB Ijtihad, KDB Berkat, KDB Syafaat, and KDB Afiat) that had already been put into service with the RBN were also further commissioned. Two of these patrol boats were put into service in March 2010, and the other two by August of the same year. The Waspada-class fast attack craft and Perwira-class patrol boat, which had served the Sultanate for forty years, were scheduled to be replaced by these modern platforms.

=== Present day ===
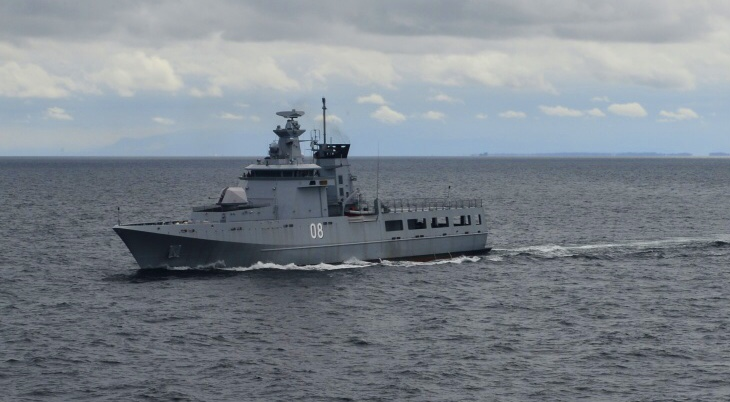
KDB Darulaman underway during CARAT Brunei in 2018

On 28 November 2011, the RBN celebrated the commissioning of a new Fast Interceptor Boat (FIB 25-012) known as KDB Mustaed. During the Exercise RIMPAC 2014 naval exercise, which was hosted by the United States Navy, the RBN's Darussalam-class OPVs, KDB Darussalam and KDB Darulaman, fired their MBDA Exocet MM40 Block II anti-ship missiles for the first time in the Pacific Missile Range Facility (PMRF), which is located 80 nautical miles (150 km; 92 mi) north of Kauai. The Perwira-class patrol boats were all officially decommissioned in 2016–2017. In 2019, the RBN unveiled the Singapore-based Force-21 manufactured Digital Disruptive Pattern (D2P) battle-dress uniform in digital blue colours at the 58th anniversary celebration at the Bolkiah Garrison.

In April 2021, the RBN installed the Royal Brunei Navy Full Mission Bridge Simulator (RBN FMBS) to provide synthetic training for all sailors of the RBN. The RBN received the two former Fearless-Class patrol vessels, RSS Brave, which was retired on 27 August 2019, and RSS Gallant, which was decommissioned on 11 December 2020, as a gift in March 2023 after they had been renovated. They are currently referred to as KDB Al-Faruq and KDB As-Siddiq in RBN service, which means "truthful." They are 55 metres (180 feet) long, weighing 500 tonnes (551 short tons; 492 long tons).

== Roles and organisation ==
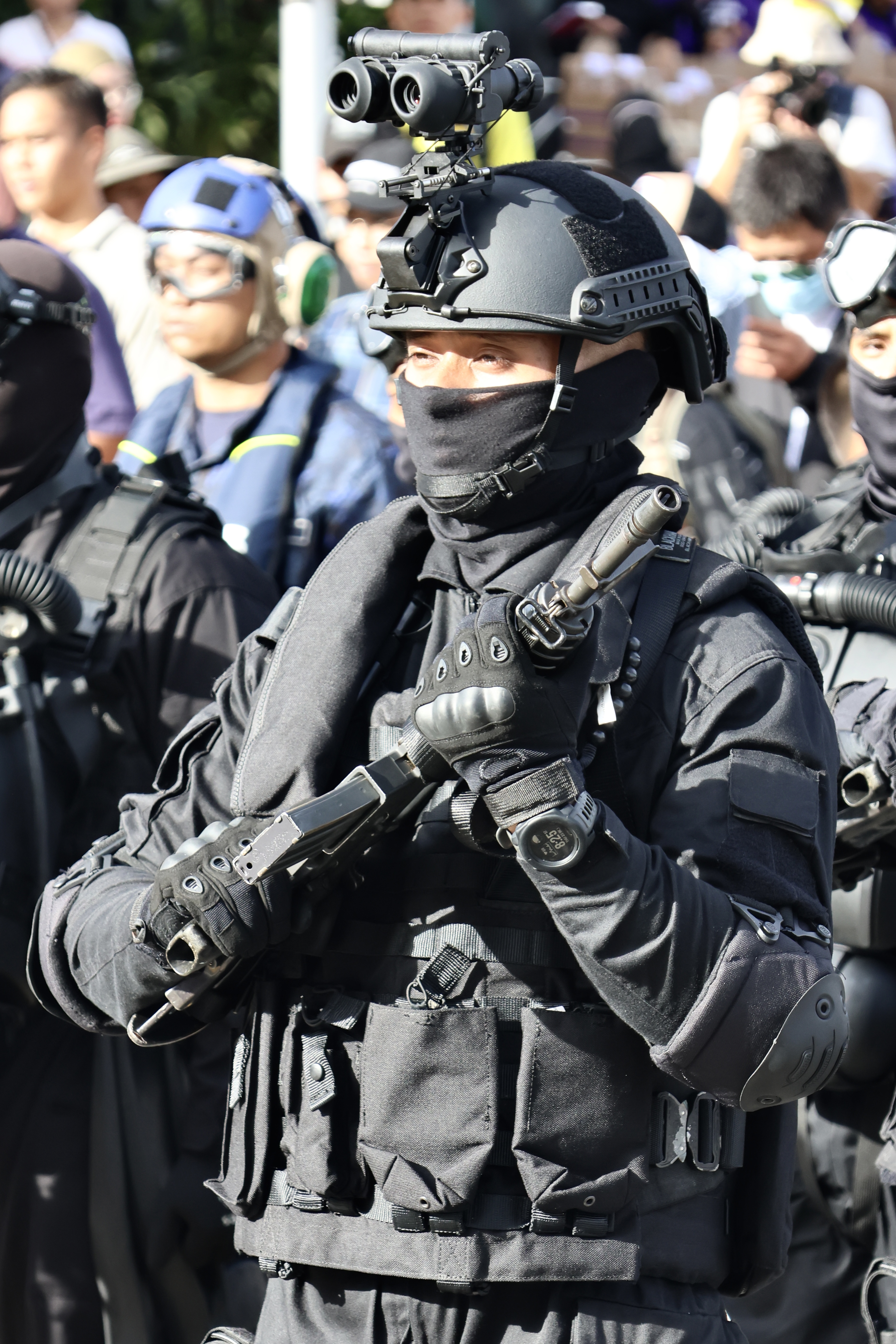
A member of the Naval Surface Action Group during National Day 2023

=== Roles ===
The roles of the RBN are:

- Deterrence against attack mounted by sea-borne forces;
- Protection of national offshore resources;
- Maintaining Sea Lines of Communication (SLOC);
- Surveillance of the 200 nautical miles (370 kilometres; 230 miles) Exclusive Economic Zone (EEZ);
- Maritime search and rescue operations;
- Support of units of the Royal Brunei Armed Forces operational activities;
- Provide support for other security agencies and ministries as ordered by Ministry of Defence of Brunei.

=== Organisation ===
The RBN is divided into four main components as follows:

- Fleet
- Administration
- Training
- Logistics

=== Headquarters ===
The administration of First Sea Battalion moved to a new base at Jalan Tanjong Pelumpong Muara in 1974. This base is now known as the Muara Naval Base. The Muara Naval Base serves as the headquarters of the RBN. It was expanded in 1997 to include facilities to support three offshore support vessels. Muara Naval Base is frequently visited by foreign warships, most notable are the frequent visits by British Royal Navy ships. Persekutuan Pengakap Negara Brunei Darussalam visits the naval base sometimes too.

== Commander ==
No.	Portrait	Name (birth–death)	Term of office			Ref.
No.	Portrait	Name (birth–death)	Took office	Left office	Time in office	Ref.
1		Major General; Pengiran Ibnu Basit (born 1942)	1965	1966	0–1 years	
2		Colonel; Kefli Razali (born 1940)	22 April 1983	30 September 1986	3 years, 161 days	
3		Lieutenant Colonel; Noeh Abdul Hamid (?–1988)	30 September 1986	30 December 1988	2 years, 91 days	
4		Lieutenant Colonel; Shahri Mohammad Ali (?–?)	30 December 1988	1 November 1991	2 years, 306 days	
5		Lieutenant Colonel; Abdul Latif Damit (1950–?)	1 November 1991	25 June 1993	1 year, 236 days	
(2)		Colonel; Kefli Razali (born 1940)	25 June 1993	3 February 1995	1 year, 223 days	
6		Colonel; Abdul Jalil Ahmad (born ?)	5 February 1995	13 June 2002	7 years, 128 days	
7		Colonel; Joharie Matussin (?-2026)	13 June 2002	16 May 2008	5 years, 338 days	
8		First Admiral; Abdul Halim Hanifah (born 1965)	16 May 2008	28 February 2014	5 years, 288 days	
9		First Admiral; Abdul Aziz (born 1966)	28 February 2014	13 March 2015	1 year, 13 days	
10		First Admiral; Pengiran Norazmi (born ?)	13 March 2015	19 April 2019	4 years, 37 days	
11		First Admiral; Othman Suhaili (born 1970)	19 April 2019	31 December 2020	1 year, 256 days	
12		First Admiral; Spry Serudi (born 1970)	31 December 2020	30 December 2022	1 year, 364 days	
13		Captain; Mohamad Sarif Pudin (born 1972)	30 December 2022	10 January 2025	2 years, 11 days	
14		First Admiral; Sahibul Bahari (born 1972)	10 January 2025	Incumbent	1 year, 293 days	

== Rank structure ==
=== Commissioned officer ===
The rank insignia of commissioned officers.

Rank group	General / flag officers					Senior officers			Junior officers
Royal Brunei Navy
Royal Brunei Navy	Laksamana armada	Laksamana	Laksamana madya	Laksamana muda	Laksamana pertama	Kepten	Komander	Leftenan komander	Leftenan	Leftenan madya	Leftenan muda

=== Enlisted ===
The rank insignia of non-commissioned officers and enlisted personnel.

Rank group	Senior NCOs				Junior NCOs		Enlisted
Royal Brunei Navy							No insignia
Royal Brunei Navy	Pegawai waran 1	Pegawai waran 2	Bintara kanan	Bintara	Laskar kanan	Laskar muda	Prebet/Soldadu

== Equipment ==
The current fleet of the Royal Brunei Navy is as follows:

class or name	image	builder	type	year entered service	details	ship name, pennant no.
offshore patrol boat
Darussalam class		Lürssen Werft, Bremen-Vegesack, Germany	offshore patrol vessel	2011-2014	80 metres (262 ft) OPV ordered from Lürssen Werft. Armament: 1× Bofors 57 mm Mk3; 2× Oerlikon 20mm/85 KAA; 4× Exocet MM40 Block 3	Darussalam (06); Darulehsan (07); Darulaman (08); Daruttaqwa (09)
Inshore patrol boat
Ijtihad class		Lürssen Werft, Bremen-Vegesack, Germany	patrol boat	2010	41 metres (135 ft) PV ordered from Lürssen Werft. Armament: 1× Rheinmetall MLG 27 mm gun; 2× 7.62 mm machine gun	Itjihad (17); Berkat (18); Syafaat (19); Afiat (20)
Fearless class		ST Engineering, Singapore	patrol vessel	2023	Formerly commissioned into the Singapore Navy, later gifted to Brunei in March 2023. Armament: 1× Oto Melara 76 mm gun; 4× STK 50MG 12.7 mm (0.50 in) HMG; Mistral missile; EuroTorp A244/S Mod 1 torpedoes	As-Siddiq (95); Al-Faruq (96)
fast attack craft
Mustaed class		Marinteknik Shipyard Tuas, Singapore	fast attack craft	2011	27 metres (89 ft) FAC based on Lürssen Werft FIB25-012 design. Built in Singapore. Armament: 2× 7.62 mm machine gun	Mustaed (21)
Waspada class		Vosper Thornycroft, Singapore	fast attack craft	1978–1979	37 metres (121 ft) FAC ordered from Vosper Thornycroft. Total of 3 ships. Decommissioned April 2011. 1 in Brunei service and 2 donated to Indonesia as KRI Salawaku (642) and KRI Badau (643). Armament: 2× Oerlikon 30 mm GCM-BO1; 2× Aérospatiale Exocet MM38 (removed)	Waspada (P02)
landing craft
Serasa class		Transfield Shipbuilding, Henderson, Australia	amphibious warfare craft (LCM)	1996	Armament: 2× 20 mm/90 calibre Oerlikon GAM B01 AA; 2× 7.62 mm machine guns	Serasa (L33); Teraban (L34)
Damuan class		Cheverton Workboats, Cowes, England	landing craft utility	1976-1977	unarmed, carries 30 tons of cargo	Puni (L32)
support vessel
–		Cheverton Boatworks, Cowes, England	support launch	1982	used as tug and dive tender	Burong Nuri

=== Others ===
Personnel launches used for riverine patrols

- Aman (01)
- Damai (02)
- Sentosa (04)
- Sejahteru (06)

Fisheries and Industry / Primary Resources ministries also operate 16 metres (52 ft) patrol boats built by Syarikat Cheoy Lee Shipyards (delivered 2002).

== Joint exercises and training ==
The Royal Brunei Navy has an annual joint exercise and training those are CARAT, RIMPAC, AMNEX, Ex Pelican and etc. Officers and sailors of the Royal Brunei Navy are also sent overseas for advanced training, generally to Australia, Brazil, Malaysia, New Zealand, Singapore, United Kingdom, and United States of America.

== Gallery ==
gallery of images of Royal Brunei Navy
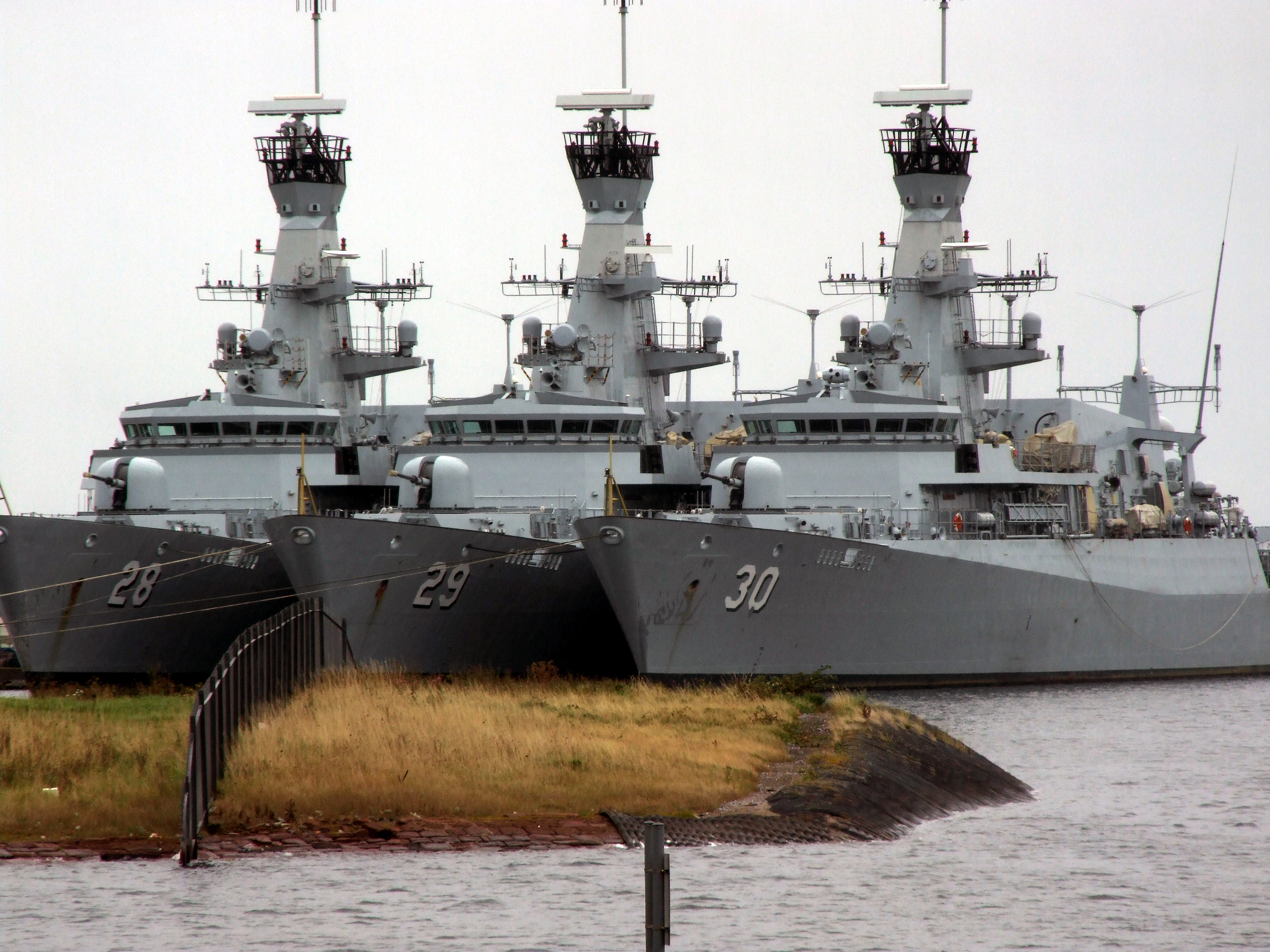
KDB Nakhoda Ragam (28), KDB Bendahara Sakam (29), and KDB Jerambak (30) sitting outside BAE Scotstoun, Scotland, September 2007.

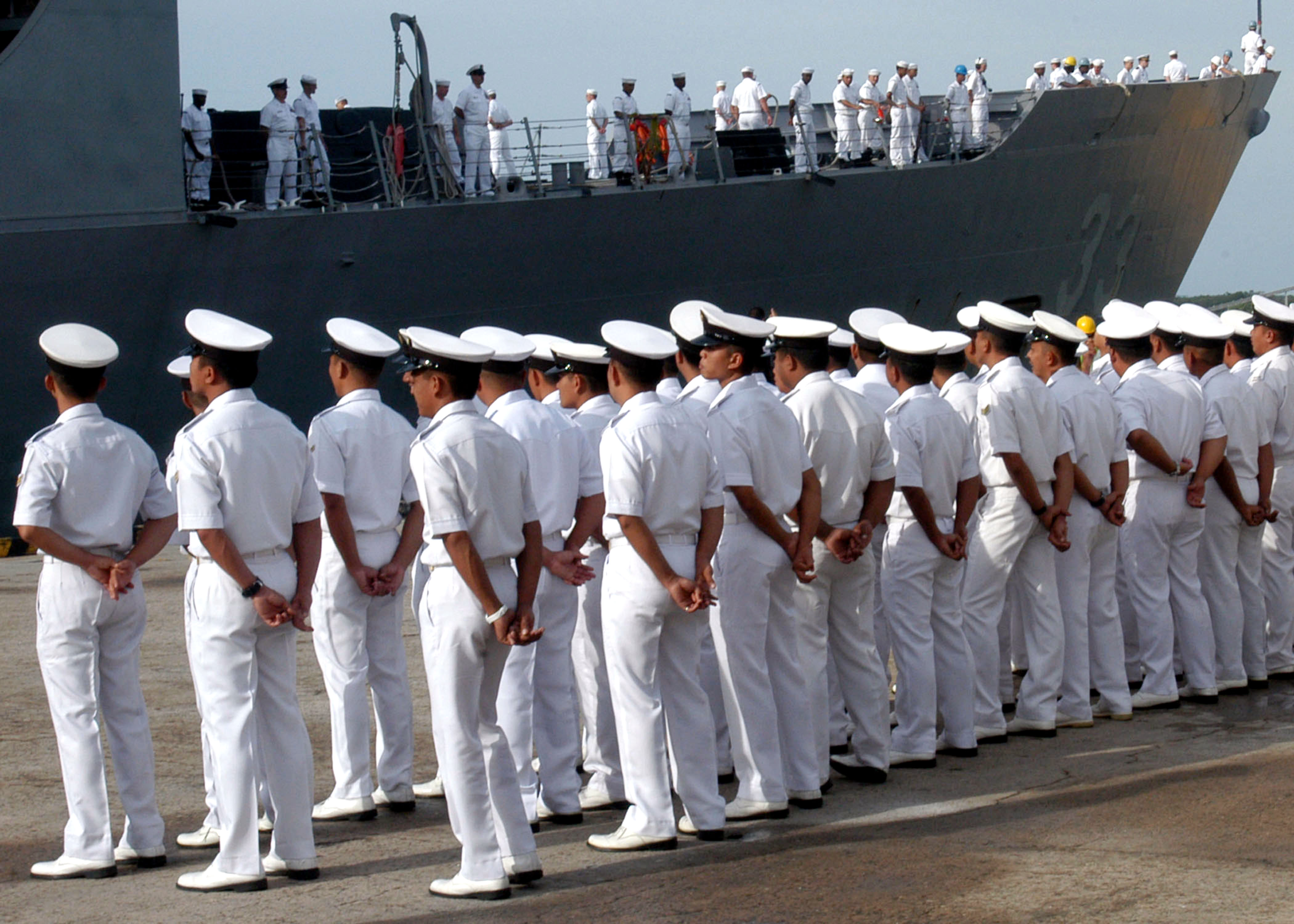
Royal Brunei Navy personnel stand easy on parade as USS Jarrett (FFG-33) pulls into Muara Port, Brunei during CARAT 2007.

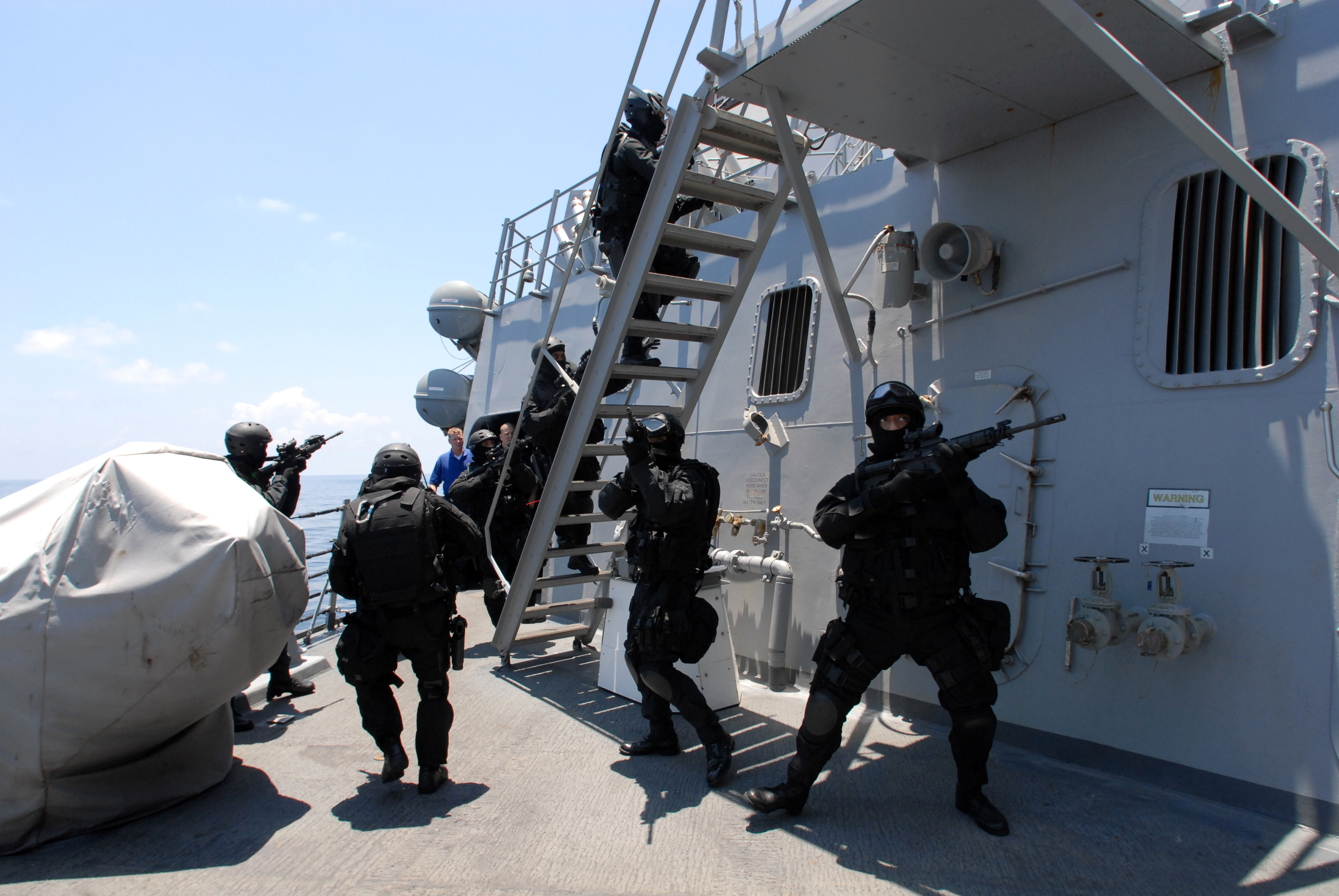
Members of the Brunei Special Forces rush towards the pilot house of USS Howard (DDG-83) during a visit, board, search and seizure exercise, August 2008.

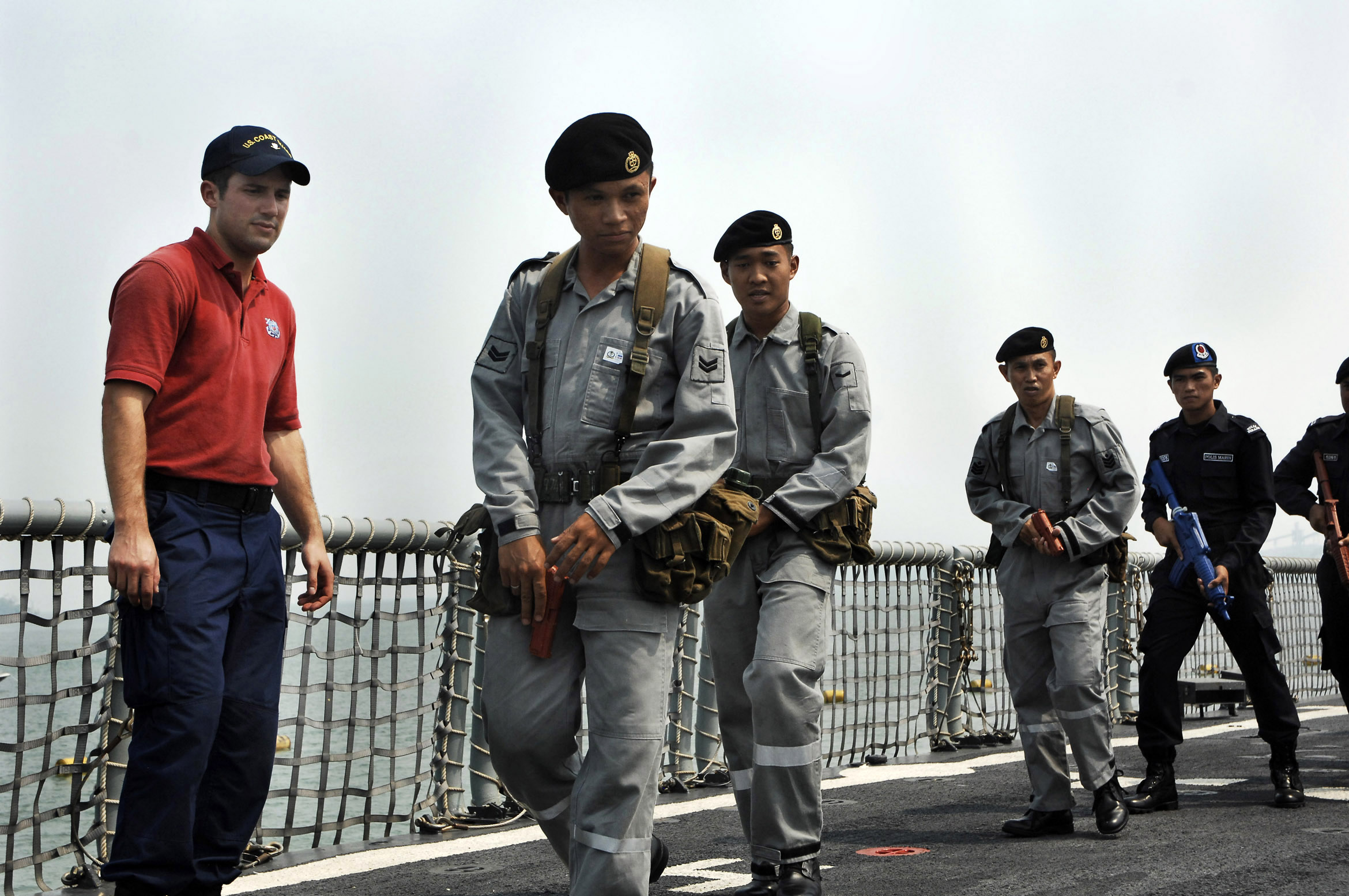
US Coast Guard directs Royal Brunei Navy personnel aboard USS Crommelin (FFG-37) during CARAT 2009.

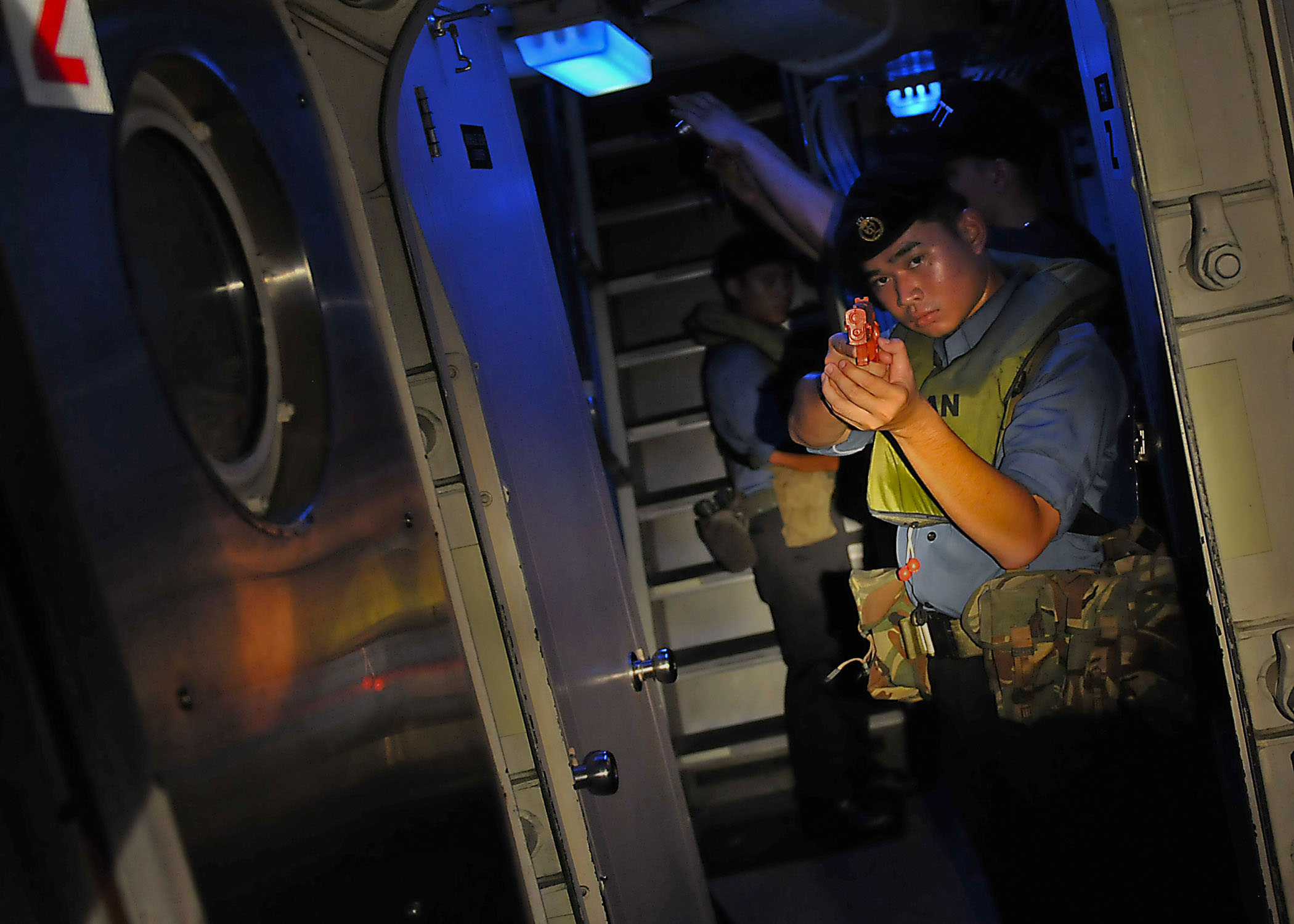
A Royal Brunei Navy sailor watch as passageway aboard USCGC Mellon (WHEC-717) during CARAT 2010.

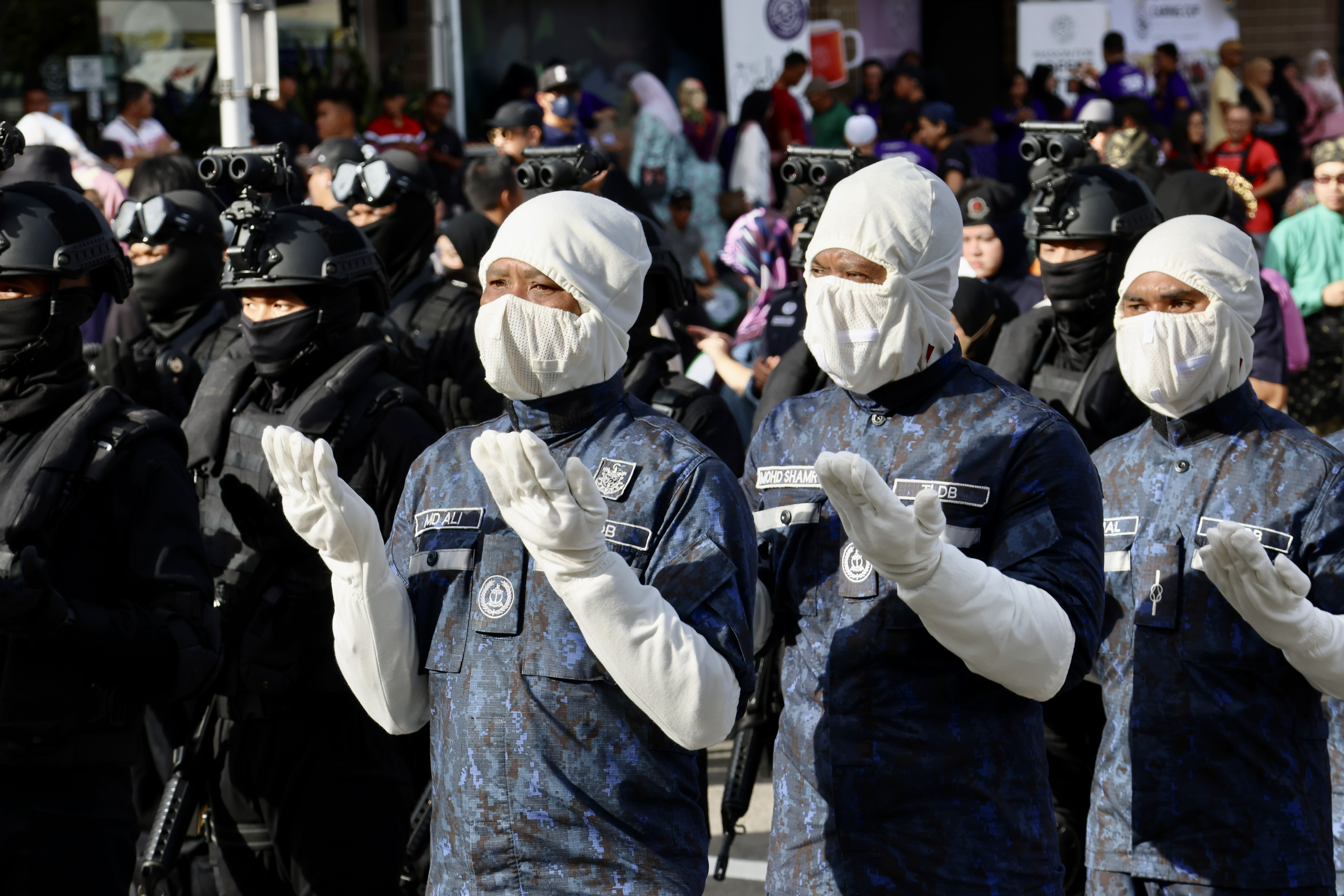
Royal Brunei Navy sailors on parade in their digital blue coloured Digital Disruptive Pattern (D2P) battle-dress uniform (BDU) during the 2023 National Day of Brunei.

== See also ==
- Naval Surface Action Group
- Maritime Special Operations Squadron
- Royal Brunei Navy Primary School
- Royal Brunei Navy Religious School
