= KDB Mustaed =

History

Brunei Darussalam
- Name: Mustaed
- Owner: Government of Brunei
- Ordered: 26 March 2010
- Builder: Marinteknik Shipyard, Tuas
- Laid down: 23 December 2010
- Launched: 29 September 2011
- Commissioned: 25 November 2011
- Home port: Muara Naval Base
- Identification: Pennant number: 21
- Motto: Always Ready
- Status: active

General characteristics
- Type: FIB 25-012
- Displacement: 73 tonnes (80 tons)
- Length: 27 m (88 ft 7 in)
- Beam: 6.2 m (20 ft 4 in)
- Draught: 1.2 m (3 ft 11 in)
- Installed power: 3,580 kW (4,801 hp)
- Propulsion: 2× diesel engines, 2× waterjet
- Speed: 40 knots (74 km/h; 46 mph) maximum
- Endurance: 21 days
- Complement: 11+ (+2 embarked)
- Sensors & processing systems: 1× Furuno navigation radar
- Armament: 2× 7.62 mm machine gun

KDB Mustaed (21) is the only ship of its kind in the Royal Brunei Navy (RBN; Malay: Tentera Laut Diraja Brunei, TLDB). The vessel, a fast interceptor boat, is in active service in the Royal Brunei Navy.

== Construction and career ==
KDB Mustaed was built by Marinteknik Shipyard in Tuas, Singapore to a Lürssen FIB 25-012 design, and commissioned on 25 November 2011; 14 years ago. She is capable of border patrol, surveillance, fishery protection, and high speed interception, and carries a 4 metres (13 feet 1 inch) rigid inflatable boat (RIB).
