= KDB Seteria =

Bruneian missile boat

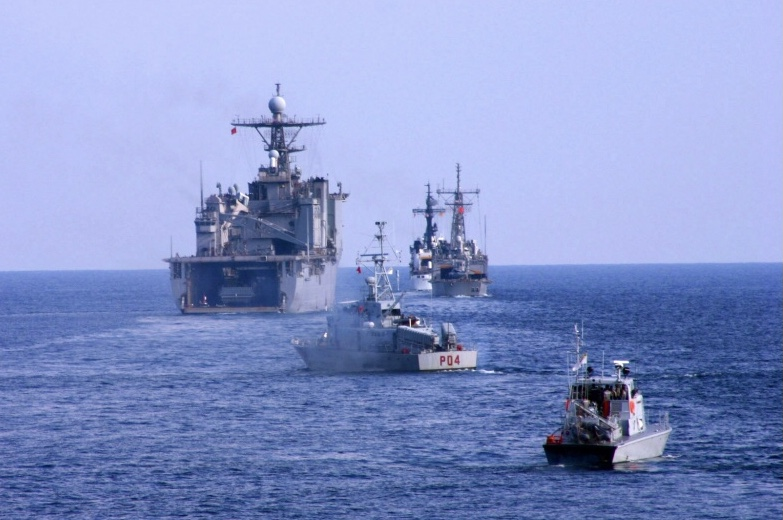
- KDB Seteria underway during CARAT 2008

History

Brunei
- Name: Seteria
- Ordered: 1976
- Builder: Vosper Thornycroft, Singapore
- Launched: 15 March 1978
- Commissioned: 25 March 1979
- Home port: Muara, Brunei
- Identification: P-04
- Status: Active

General characteristics
- Class & type: Waspada-class fast attack craft
- Displacement: 206 tons (full load)
- Length: 121 ft (37 m)
- Draft: 6 ft (1.8 m)
- Propulsion: 2 MTU 20V 538 TB91 diesels
- Speed: 32 knots (59 km/h)
- Range: 1,200 nautical miles (2,200 km) at 14 knots (26 km/h)
- Complement: 4 officers, 20 enlisted
- Sensors & processing systems: Kelvin Hughes Type 1007 (surface search)
- Electronic warfare & decoys: Decca RDL ESM
- Armament: 2 x Oerlikon 30mm GCM-BO1; 2 x Aérospatiale Exocet MM38; 2 x M2 Browning

KDB Seteria (P-04) is the third ship of Waspada-class built up in the late 1970s, one of three ordered in Singapore. She was launched on 1978, and is still in active service with the Royal Brunei Navy.

== Construction ==
Seteria was ordered in 1976. She was laid down by Vosper Thornycroft in Singapore and launched on 15 March 1978. She was commissioned on 25 June 1979.

== Description ==
Seteria is a small missile boat, orientated to be a patrol boat. The overall length of this boat is 36.9 m, the width – 7.2 m and the draft – 1.8 m. The displacement tonnage is 150 or 206 tones (depending on the source). The ship is powered by two compression-ignition engines MTU 20V538 TB91 (9000 hp). Maximum quantity of the fuel she can take is 16 tones, consequently she can sail for 1,200 nautical miles at a speed of 14 knots.

She is armed with one twin mount for the Oerlikon 30-calibre GCM-B01 guns. The angle of this gun barrel is 85°, the weight of the projectile is 1 kg, the range is of 10 000 m and the rate of fire is 650 RPM. She is also equipped with two single M2 Browning and two launchers of anti-ship missiles MM38 Exocet.

== History ==
Seteria was commanded by First Admiral Dato Seri Pahlawan Haji Othman bin Hj Suhaili.

=== Exercise Pelican 1979 ===
Ex Pelican 1979, the first ever joint naval exercise between Royal Brunei Navy and Republic of Singapore Navy. Seteria and KDB Waspada from Brunei and RSS Formidable and RSS Vigor.

=== Exercise Pelican 1997 ===
A joint exercise hosted by Royal Brunei Navy and Republic of Singapore Navy from 2 to 9 October 1997. Seteria, KDB Serasa, KDB Perwira, KDB Pemburu, Waspada, RSS Vigilance, RSS Sea Tiger and RSS Courageous participated in the exercise.

=== CARAT 2004 ===
Seteria, Perwira, Pemburu, Waspada, USS Fort McHenry, USS McCampbell and USS Russell conducted a Cooperation Afloat Readiness and Training (CARAT) in the South China Sea on 24 June 2004.

=== Helang Laut 2008 ===
The Royal Brunei Navy and the Tentera National Indonesia Angkatan Laut (TNI AL) conducted a 5 days exercise from 15–19 December 2008 called "Helang Laut”. Seteria, Waspada, Pemburu and Serasa from Brunei and KRI Layang and KRI Singa from Indonesia participated in the exercise.

== Gallery ==
KDB Seteria Gallery

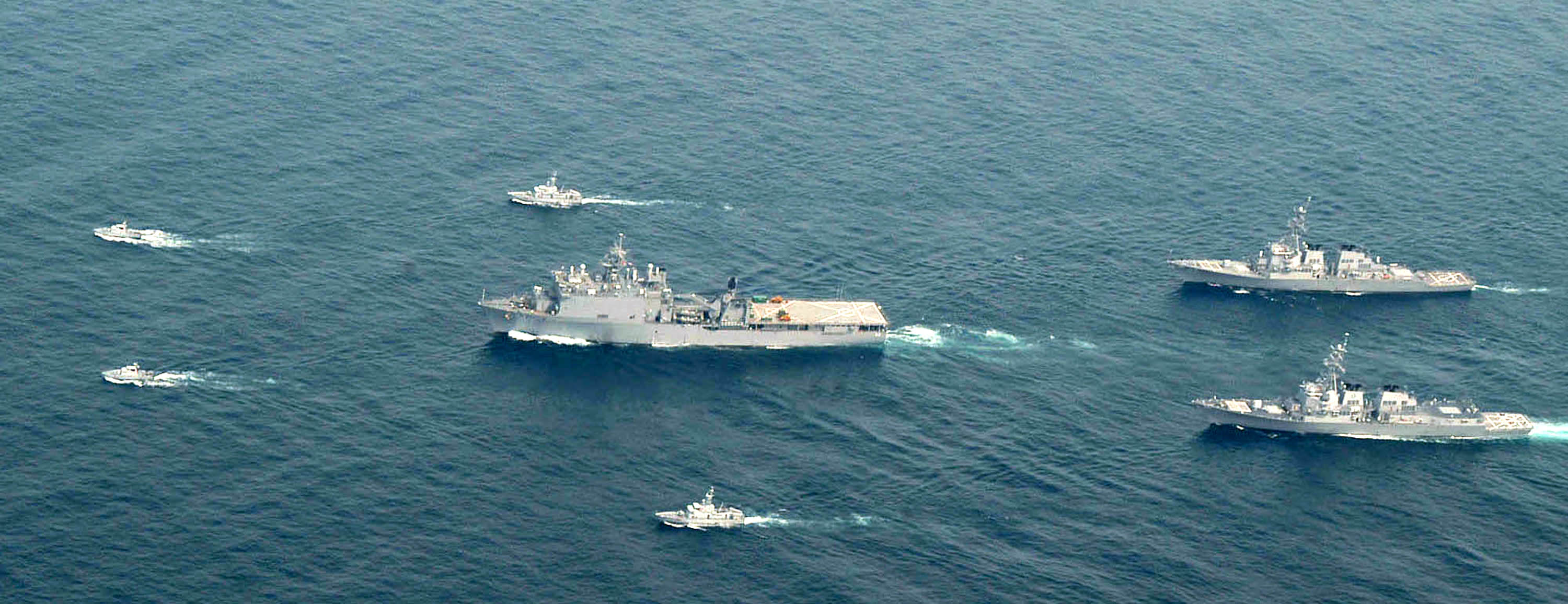
CARAT 2004
