= Fleet Commander (disambiguation) =

A Fleet Commander may refer to:

- Fleet Commander, a rank in the Royal Navy
- Fleet commander (Kriegsmarine), a rank in the German Kriegsmarine
- A fleet commander of a numbered fleet

== See also ==
- Fleet Command (disambiguation)
