= RSS Formidable =

2004 Formidable-class frigate

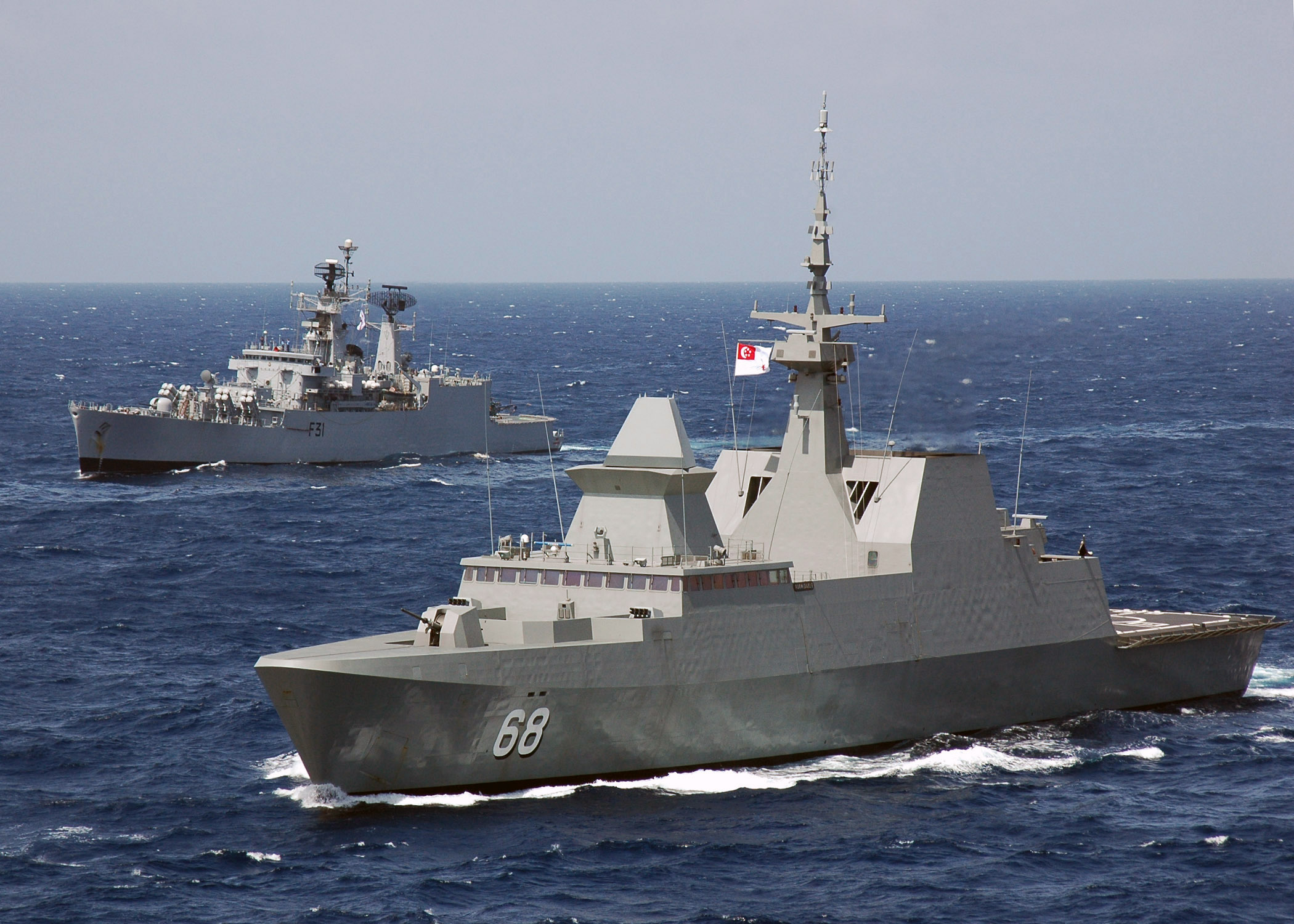
- RSS Formidable and INS Brahmaputra in the Bay of Bengal on 5 September 2007

History

Singapore
- Name: Formidable
- Namesake: Formidable
- Ordered: Mid–1990s
- Builder: DCNS
- Launched: 7 January 2004
- Commissioned: 5 May 2007
- Home port: Changi
- Identification: Callsign: S6KL; Pennant number: 68
- Motto: Triumphant At Sea
- Status: Active

General characteristics
- Class & type: Formidable-class frigate
- Displacement: 3,200 tonnes (3,100 long tons; 3,500 short tons)
- Length: 114.8 m (376 ft 8 in)
- Beam: 16.3 m (53 ft 6 in)
- Draught: 6.0 m (19 ft 8 in)
- Installed power: 4 × ISM V1708 diesel generators, each producing 860 kilowatts (1,150 shp); Total output: 3,440 kW (4,610 shp)
- Propulsion: Combined diesel and diesel (CODAD) arrangement; 4 × MTU 20V 8000 M90, each rated at 9,100 kW (12,200 shp); Total output: 36,400 kW (48,800 shp)
- Speed: Maximum: 27 knots (50 km/h; 31 mph); Cruising: 18 kn (33 km/h; 21 mph)
- Range: 4,200 nautical miles (7,800 km)
- Complement: 71, excluding air crew detachment of approx. 19
- Sensors & processing systems: Search radar: Thales Herakles multi-function passive electronically scanned array radar; Navigation radar: Terma Electronic Scanter 2001; Sonar: EDO Model 980 active low frequency towed sonar (ALOFTS)
- Electronic warfare & decoys: ESM: RAFAEL C-PEARL-M; Decoys: Sagem Défense Sécurité New Generation Dagaie System, 2 × forward & 1 × aft; Leonardo Finmeccanica Morpheus anti-torpedo suite with WASS C310 launchers, 2 x aft
- Armament: Anti-ship: 8 (Up to 24) × RGM-84C Harpoon SSMs, to be replaced by Blue Spear SSM; Anti-air: 16-cell Sylver A50 VLS for MBDA Aster 15/30, 16-cell Sylver A43 VLS for MBDA Aster 15; Anti-submarine: 2 × B515 triple tubes with reloads for EuroTorp A244/S Mod 3 torpedoes; Guns: 1x OTO Melara 76mm Super Rapid gun; 4 × STK 50MG 12.7 mm (0.50 in) HMG; 2 × 25mm Mk 38 Mod2 Typhoon Weapon Station Stabilised Gun; Non-lethal: Long-Range Acoustic Device 500 Xtreme (LRAD500X)
- Aircraft carried: 1× S-70B Seahawk multi-mission capable naval helicopter
- Aviation facilities: Flight deck and enclosed hangar for up to two medium-lift helicopters

RSS Formidable (68) is the lead ship of the Formidable-class stealth frigate of the Republic of Singapore Navy.

== Construction and career ==
RSS Formidable was built by DCNS company in France around the early 2000s. Formidable was commissioned on 5 May 2007.

=== RIMPAC 2012 ===
RSS Formidable participated in RIMPAC 2012 which lasts from 29 to 3 June August 2012. 22 nations and more than 40 warships took part in the exercise.

=== SIMBEX-16 ===
On 30 October 2016, RSS Formidable arrived in Visakhapatnam, India to prepare for naval exercise SIMBEX-16 in the Bay of Bengal.

=== Exercise Bersama Lima 18 ===
Singapore, Malaysia, Australia, New Zealand and UK held Exercise Bersama Lima from 2 to 19 October 2018. One of the ships participating was RSS Formidable.

=== Exercise Pacific Griffin 19 ===
RSS Formidable participated in Pacific Griffin 19 with its bilateral partner, the United States.

=== Exercise Pelican 22 ===
RSS Formidable participated in the 40th edition of Pelican with its bilateral partner, the Brunei

=== International Fleet Review 22 ===
RSS Formidable participated in the 70th edition of International Fleet Review celebrating the formation of JMSDF hosted by Japan

== Gallery ==
RSS Formidable Gallery

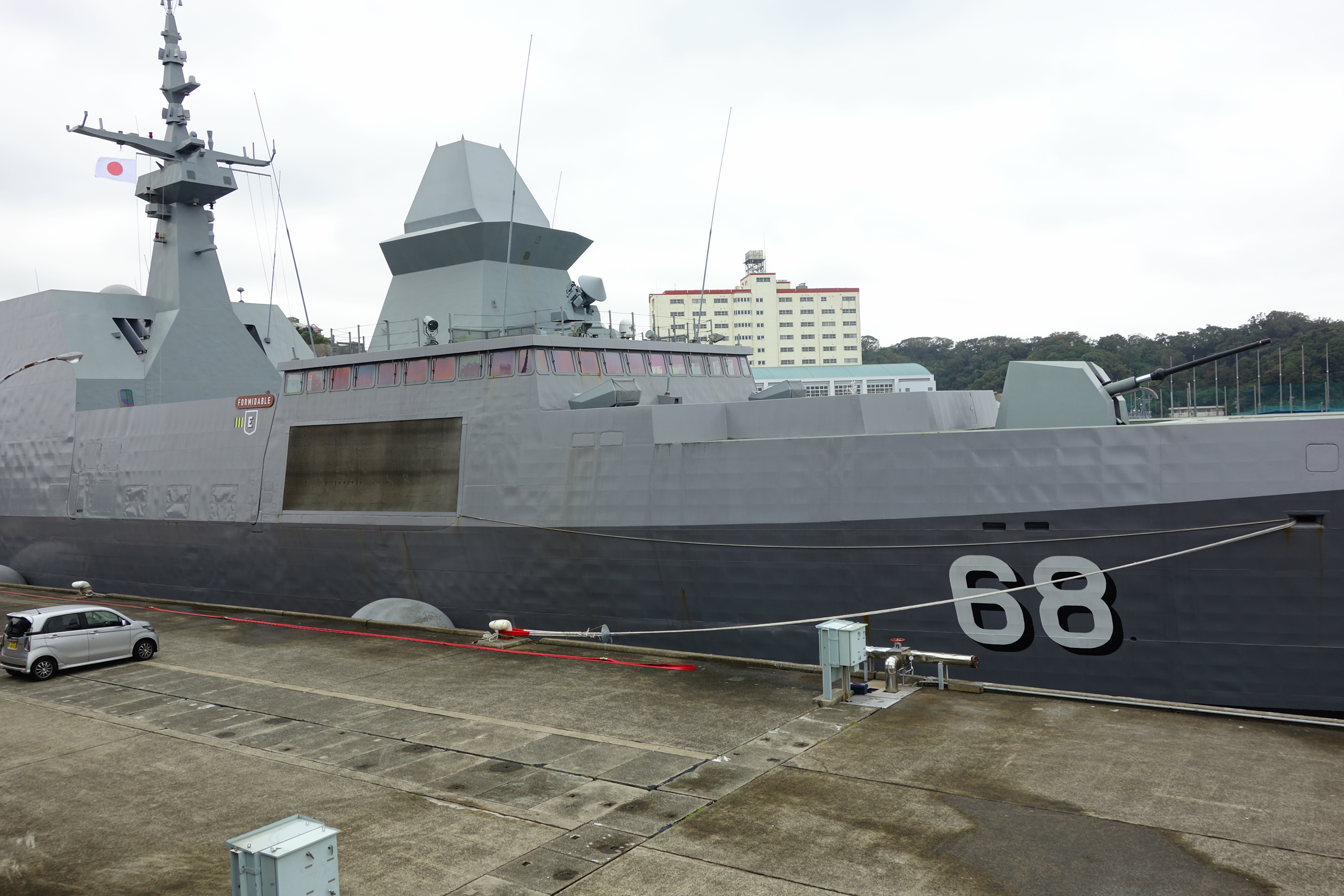
RSS Formidable docked at Yokosuka Naval Base on 14 October 2019.

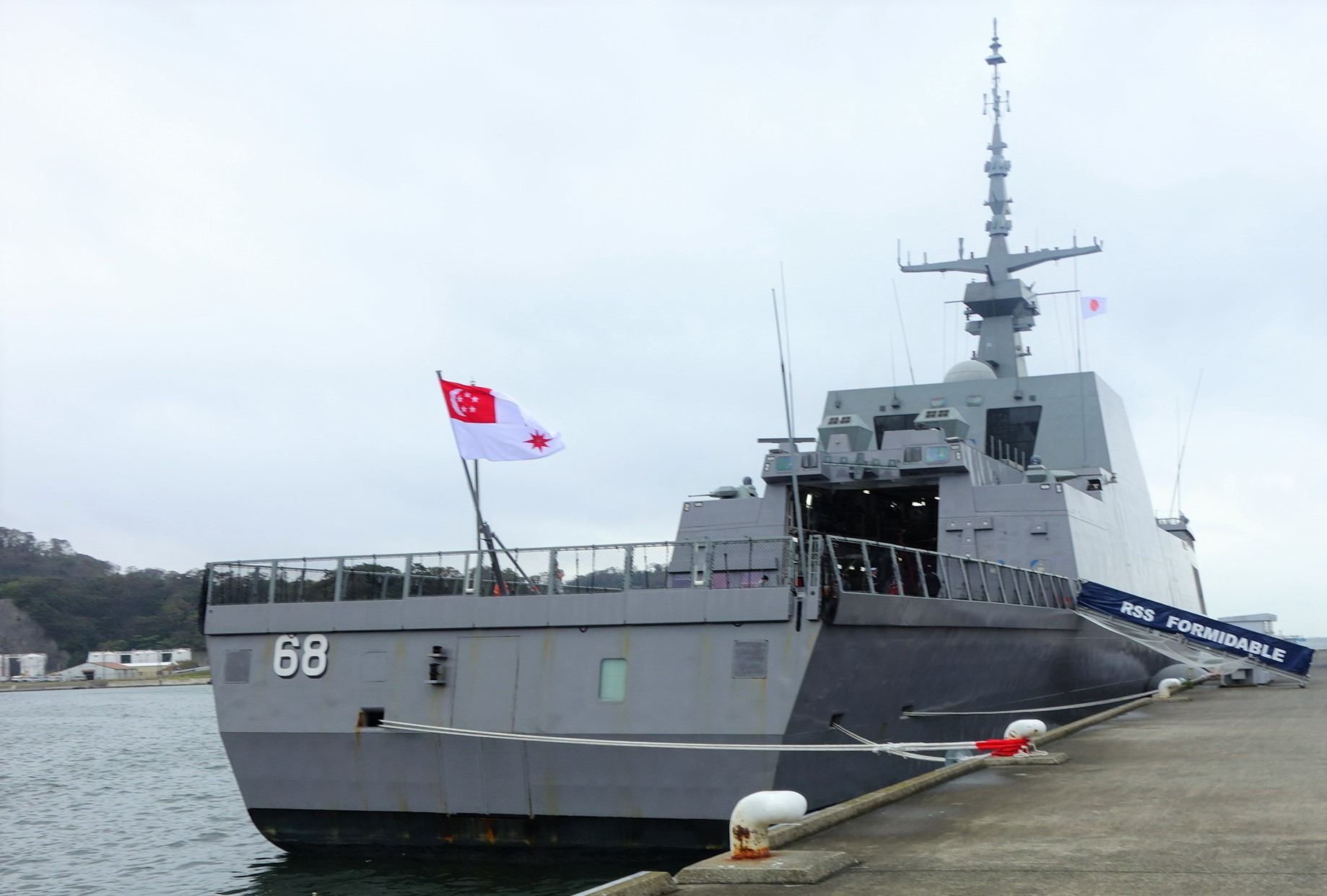
RSS Formidable docked at Yokosuka Naval Base on 14 October 2019.

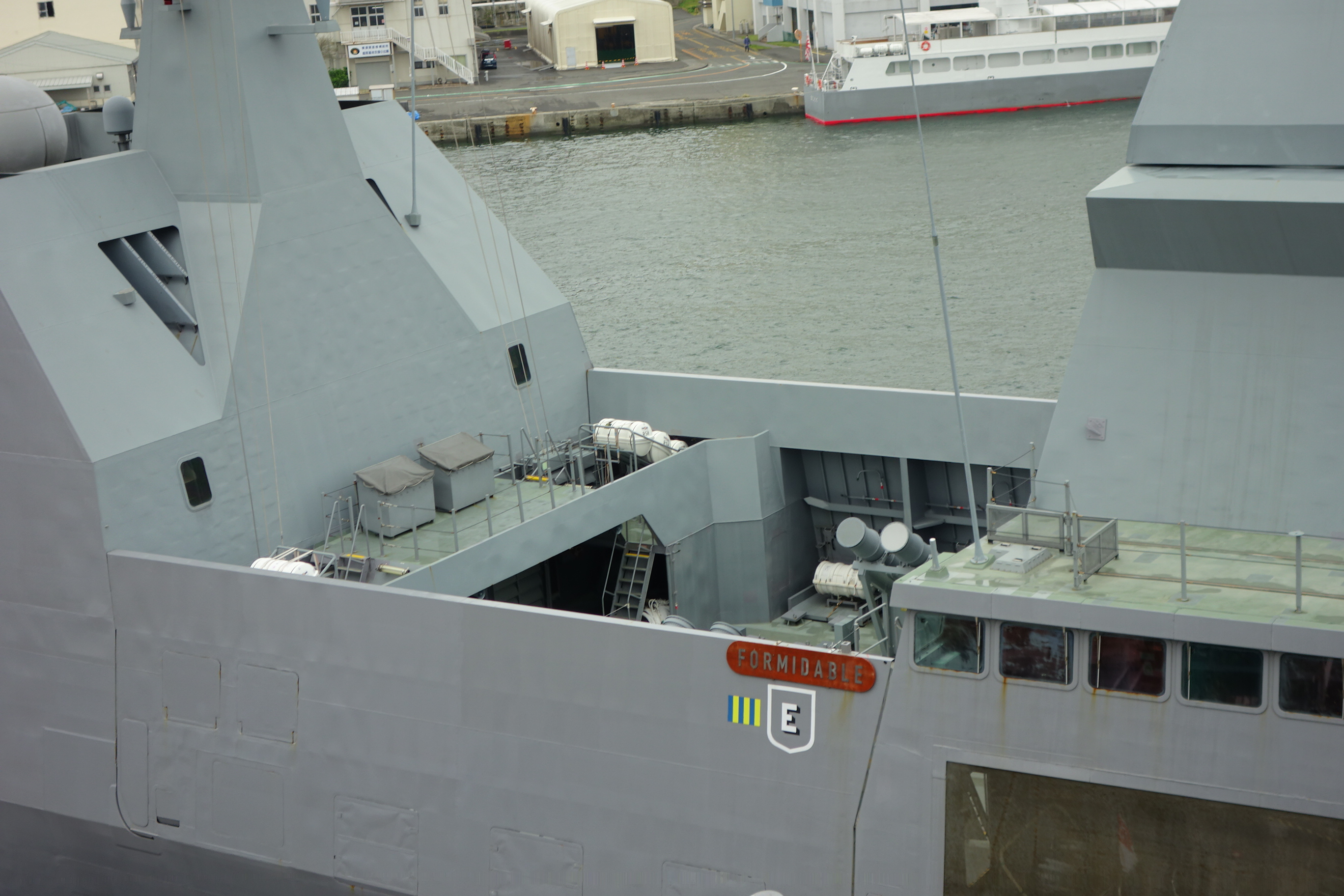
RSS Formidable docked at Yokosuka Naval Base on 14 October 2019.

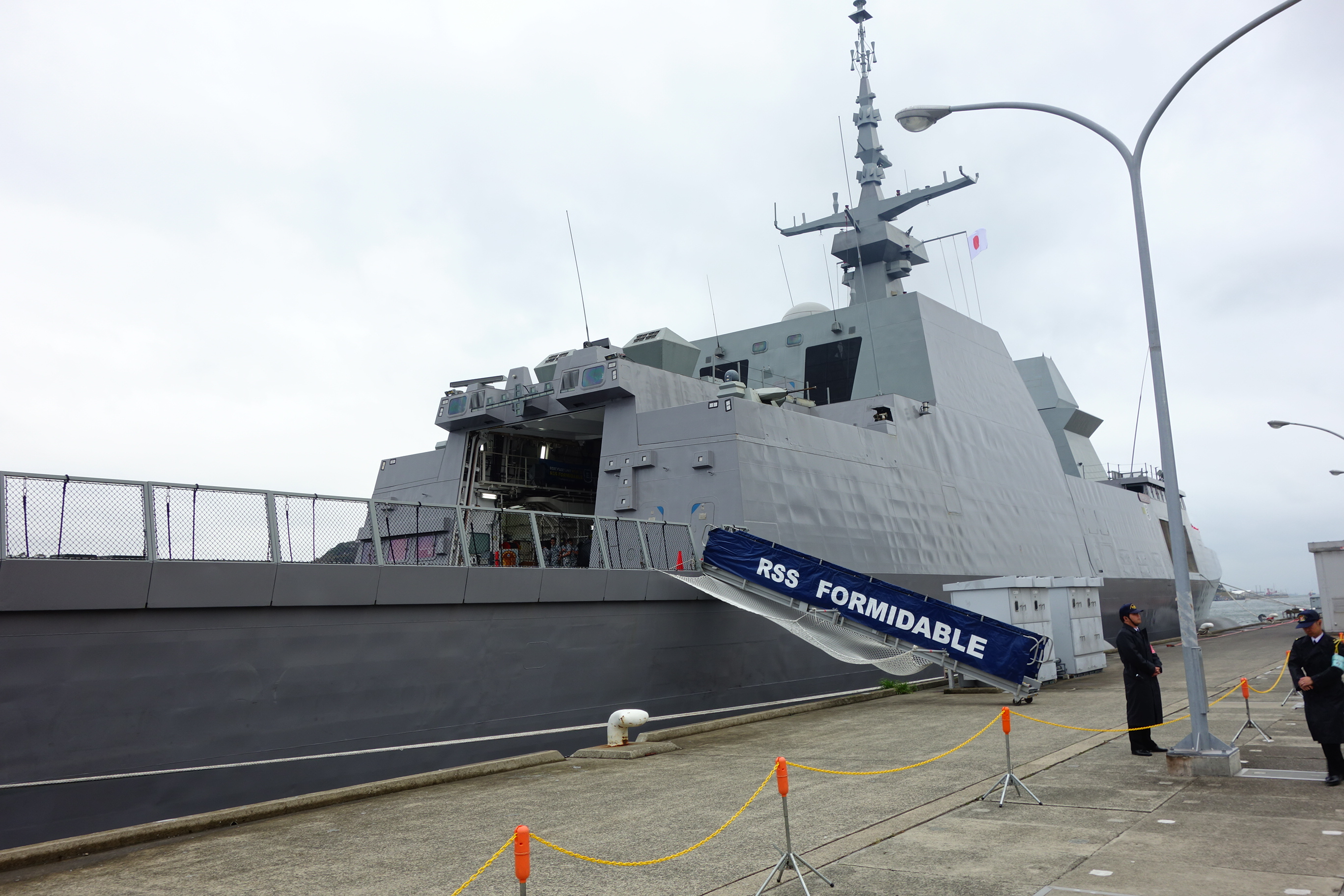
RSS Formidable docked at Yokosuka Naval Base on 14 October 2019.

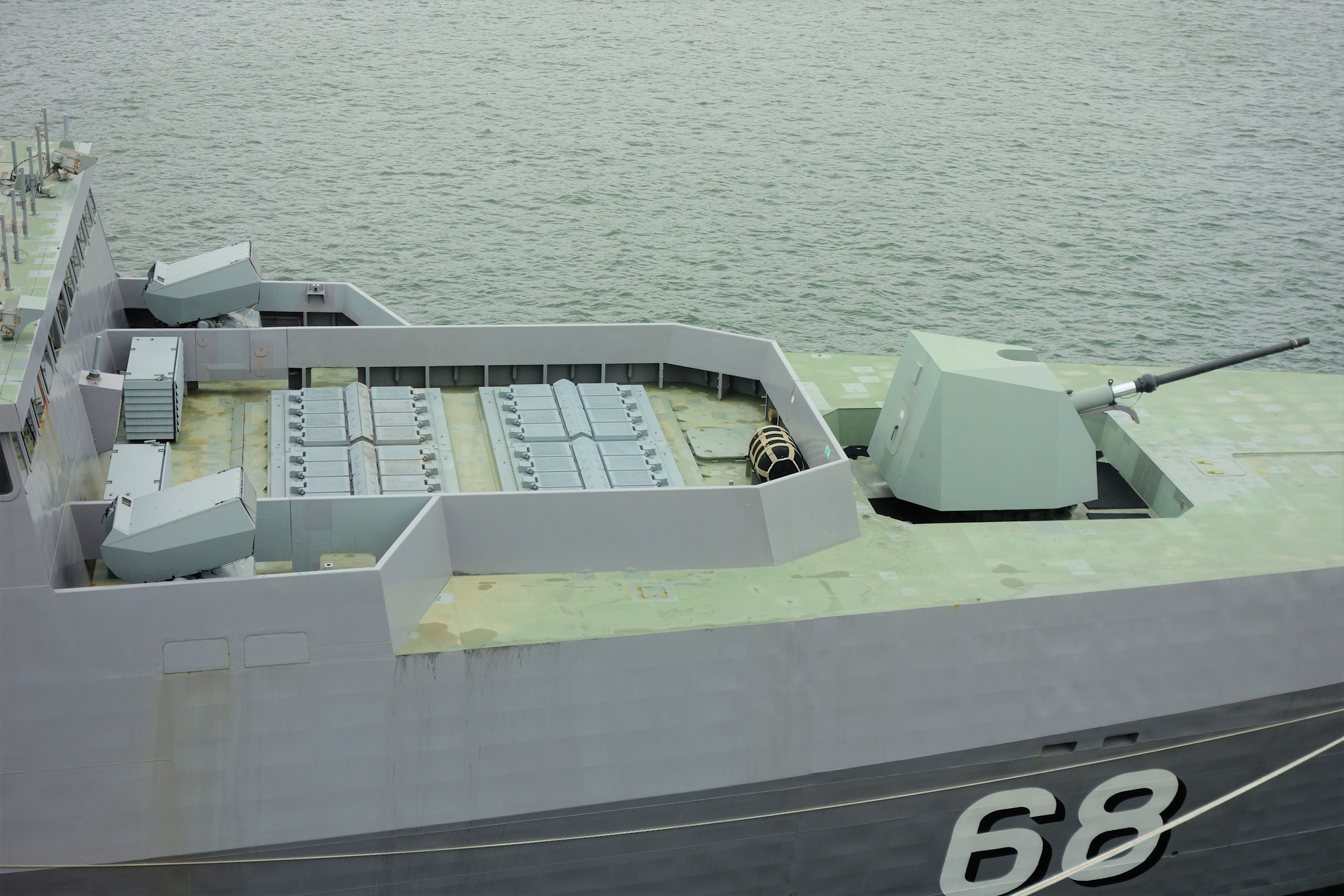
RSS Formidable docked at Yokosuka Naval Base on 14 October 2019.
