= Training Institute Royal Brunei Armed Forces =

Military training establishment

Coordinates: 4°50′50″N 114°42′01″E

- Malay: Institut Latihan Angkatan Tentera Diraja Brunei; Jawi: اينستيتوت لاتيهن اڠكتن تنترا دراج بروني
- Emblem of the TI RBAF
- Founded: 2005 (20–21) (in current form) 7 April 1969 (57 years, 6 months) (as the Cadre Company)
- Country: Brunei
- Allegiance: Sultan Hassanal Bolkiah
- Branch: Ministry of Defence
- Type: Military training
- Part of: Royal Brunei Armed Forces
- Headquarters: Penanjong Garrison, Penanjong, Tutong TA2741
- Anniversaries: 7 April
- Website: ilabdb.mindef.gov.bn

Commanders
- Commandant: Col Pengiran Noor Rumaizi
- Deputy Commandant: Lt.Col Abdul Rajid Zainie
- Chief Instructor: Maj Mohamad Safizan Ahmad
- Regiment Sergeant Major: WO2 Mohammad Dino Erwandy

The Training Institute Royal Brunei Armed Forces (TI RBAF), natively known as Institut Latihan Angkatan Tentera Diraja Brunei (IL ABDB) is a military training establishment of the Royal Brunei Armed Forces (RBAF), primarily for enlisted male and female recruit training, along with technical and junior leadership courses for non-commissioned officers (NCOs). It is currently located within Penanjong Garrison, Tutong TA2741, approximately 50 kilometres (30 miles) from Bandar Seri Begawan in the sultanate of Brunei. Approximately one-hundred courses are available per year. The annual anniversary ceremony of TI RBLF's inception was place on 7 April every year.

== Background ==
Supported by the RBAF Support Services and Training Institute, the three front-line services of the Royal Brunei Armed Forces (RBAF) are the Royal Brunei Land Force (RBLF), Royal Brunei Navy (RBN), and Royal Brunei Air Force (RBAirF). The RBAF's mandate included acting as a deterrence to any foreign force that could try to interfere directly or indirectly in the nation, as well as to any subversive elements that might be operating there or in the future. It also included being ready to launch counteraggression, counterterrorism, and counterinsurgency operations. The troops receive the foundational training for professionalism at the Training Institute.

== History ==
The forerunner to the Training Institute Royal Brunei Armed Forces was officially established at Berakas Camp on 7 April 1969, known as the Cadre Company. In 1973, it was renamed the Training Wing Depot, coinciding with a move to Bolkiah Camp. Its purpose was to oversee all courses and training for personnel in the RBAF, including Basic Recruit Training for new enlistees, along with additional skill enhancement for existing personnel. The institute's authority extends to training soldiers at various levels. It was again renamed to Training Centre in 1975. In 1981, the first Women's Company (PAW) was established, and training for females started. It was relocated for a third time in May 1986, to Penanjong Garrison in the Tutong District; its initial headquarters was within the Directorate of Land Training, and renamed the Training Centre Royal Brunei Armed Forces. Lieutenant Colonel Brahim became its inaugural commanding officer (CO), and during his time in charge, moved to a new headquarters building in 1988.

During its initial twenty-two years (1969 to 1991), the institute fell under the administration of the Regimental Headquarters, and later the Armed Forces Headquarters. On 17 September 1991, a royal decree by the Sultan and Defence Minister led to the restructuring of the RBAF into five main units, including the Training Centre RBAF. This allowed direct communication with the Commander of the Royal Brunei Armed Forces. Consequently, the position of CO was changed to the Commander, and the role of Deputy Commander was established. The first Commander was Lieutenant Colonel Ramli, and the first Deputy Commander was Major Johari. Another rename occurred in 2005, it was officially named Training Institute Royal Brunei Armed Forces. The TI RBAF Parade Square is the site of the passing out parade ceremony. Alumnus of the PAW, Hasimah Abu Bakar became the first female lieutenant colonel in 2006, and Norsuriati Sharbini became the first woman to be appointed to colonel in 2021.

== Organisation ==
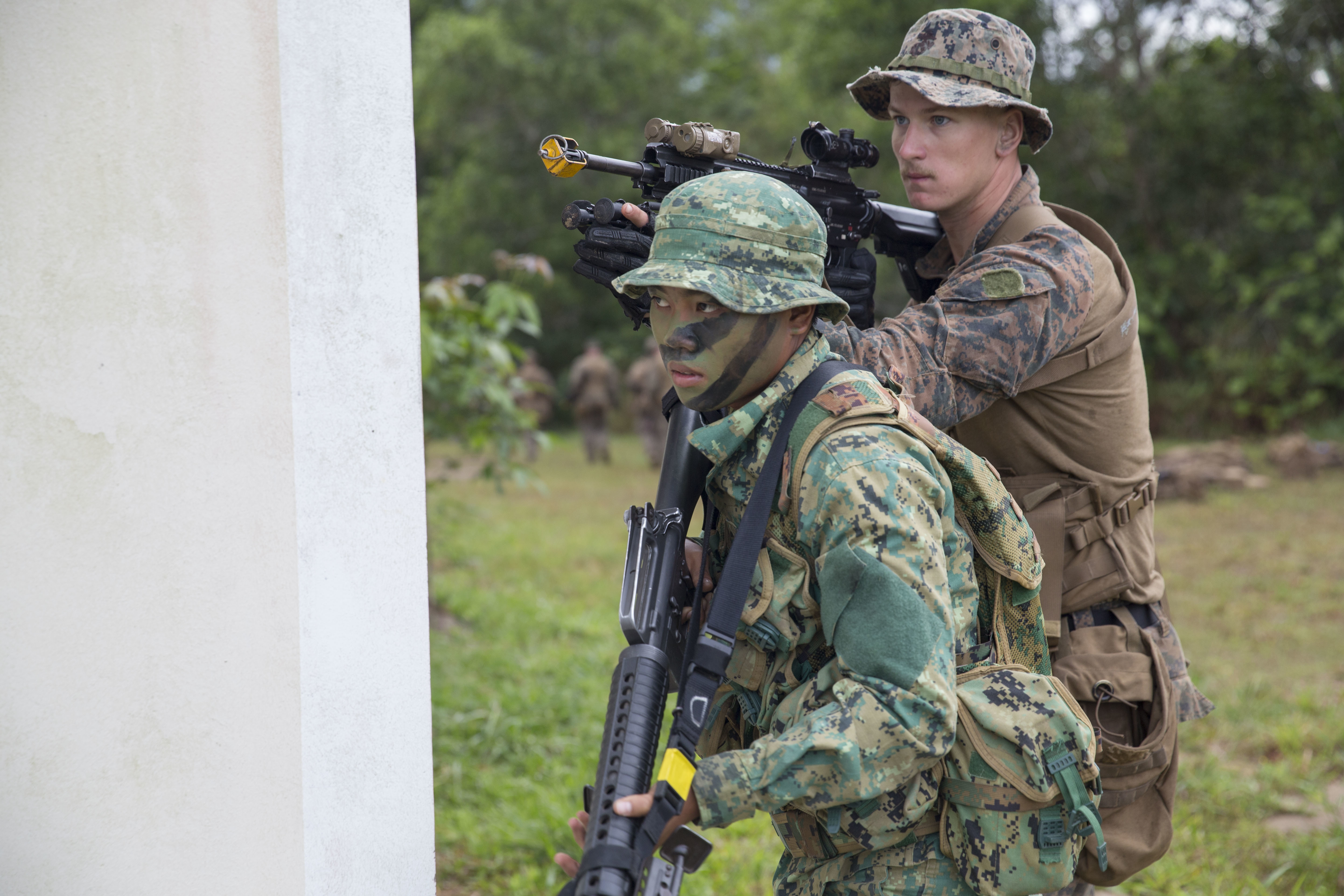
Soldiers taking part in an urban warfare (MOUT) training at the TI RBAF in 2019

In its inaugural year in 1969, the original incarnation of the future TI RBAF had limited courses and facilities. Over the subsequent thirty-four years, it evolved significantly; notably professionally qualified instructors, along with advanced teaching aids. The institute currently comprises eight key sub-units, offering a diverse range of courses to RBAF personnel of all service branches. Approximately one-hundred courses conducted annually; including multiple intakes of basic training, which until recently had a duration of six months (twenty-four weeks training) for male recruits and three months (twelve weeks) for females. Basic recruit training covers physical training, drill training, weapon training, Method of Instruction courses, and academic courses through the School of Studies. The academic programmes include courses for Boy's Company up to 'O' Level (high-school examination level), technical training for military technicians and mechanics, Basic Malay courses for Loan Service Personnel, and English language courses for native RBAF personnel, including non-commissioned officers (NCOs).

In 1990, the TI RBAF introduced the Officers' Development Wing, tasked with the comprehensive development of officers in the RBAF. This includes preparation for advanced courses, and conducting promotion examinations (PROMEX) involving both theoretical and practical elements. Collaborating with the Directorate of Training, the department also organises international-level seminars for officers (Majors) before they pursue the staff college course. Renowned lecturers from institutions such as the Universiti Brunei Darussalam, ASEAN, and Europe have been invited to contribute to the success of these seminars. As a result of the RBAF's recognition of lifelong learning and the advancements in globalisation and technology, the military branch also provides academic courses in international affairs, military technology, war studies, and ASEAN and Brunei studies to its soldiers as well as their regional counterparts.

Essential characteristics, such as courage, piety, loyalty, and professionalism, that the Ministry of Defence (MINDEF) has established via the RBAF. Starting with the 170th male intake course in 2023, the basic military training course was reduced to fourteen weeks duration, compared to its previous twenty-four week duration, (however, the earlier 158th entry had taken thirty-one weeks) under the RBAF's strategic plan to be more balanced and specialised, whilst maintaining standards and intended results. These adjustments mean that up to 960 recruits can now be trained each year. Passing out parades are occasionally reviewed by senior officers from the militaries of other countries, in addition to local commanders and family members of the graduating recruits.

The troops participate in shooting events like the International Skill at Arms Meeting, which has been a yearly staple for the RBAF since independence, in an effort to enhance their marksmanship. Every year, teams from the Australian Defence Force, Singapore Armed Forces, Royal Gurkha Rifles based there, Malaysian Armed Forces, Royal Brunei Police Force, and Singapore Armed Forces compete for the title and recognition as the best in the area. By the same token, these contests also improve friendship, confidence-building, transparency, and teamwork.

In April 2024, during the passing out parade of the 173rd male intake course, Brig. Gen. Mohammad Shanonnizam, Commander of the Royal Brunei Land Force (RBLF) reaffirmed the aims and importance of the TI RBAF, including emphasising "the development of spiritual, physical and intellectual strength throughout one’s service". Brg. Gen. Shanonnizam continued by stating:

This is the foundation that will strengthen the organisation as a whole and will allow it to function as the first line of defence in upholding the dignity of the religion, the sovereignty of the nation and the monarch

== Structure ==
The Training Institute Royal Brunei Armed Forces is currently structured into three primary units, along with additional support units, as follows:

- Recruit Company
  - Even Intake
  - Odd Intake
  - Female Intake
  - Demo Platoon
- Military Trade School
  - Land Technical (Cawangan Latihan Teknikal Darat)
  - Logistics (Cawangan Latihan Lojistik)
  - Finance (Cawangan Latihan Kewangan)
  - Clerks (Cawangan Latihan Kerani)
  - Driving (Cawangan Latihan Memandu)
  - Map Reading (Cawangan Membaca Peta)
- Evolution Centre (Pusat Evolusi)
  - Language (Cawangan Bahasa)
  - Information Technology (Cawangan Teknologi Makluma)
  - Leadership & Management (Cawangan Kepimpinan & Pengurusan, Cawangan Perkembangan & Pembentukan Latihan)
  - Instructors' Development (Cawangan Perkembangan Jurulatih)
- Admin Company
  - Quartermaster
  - Cookhouse
  - Military Transport
  - Pay
  - Physical Training Staff
  - Regimental Police
  - Officers' Mess
  - WO, SSgt & Sgt's Mess
  - RCO

== Cadets ==
Since the establishment of the unit in 1971, Brunei Cadets have been able to regularly attracted numerous student participants. Notably, in 1993, a significant gathering of Brunei Cadets occurred in Temburong, followed by a successful joint exercise with the RBN at Muara Besar Island in 1994.

== List of commandants ==
The first commanding officer (CO), initially a loan service officer from the United Kingdom, served from 1969 to 1970, with a second British officer from 1970 to 1973. From then on, subsequent appointments have all been held by Bruneian officers; Major Mohammad bin Daud became the first Brunei officer in charge from June 1973 to June 1974; with a second appointment concurrent with his promotion to Lieutenant Colonel. The Training Institute was housed in Bolkiah Camp for seventeen years, from 1969 to 1986. Officers selected to head the Training Institute at Bolkiah Camp:

no.	dates in post		rank	name	location
no.	start	end	rank	name	location
—	Apr 1969	Jun 1973	—	British loan service officers, x2	Berakas Camp
1	Jun 1973	Jun 1974	Major	Mohammad Daud	Bolkiah Camp
(1)	Jul 1974	Apr 1975	Lieutenant Colonel	Mohammad Daud	Bolkiah Camp
2	May 1975	Jan 1979	Lieutenant Colonel	Ariffin Abdul Wahab	Bolkiah Camp
—	Apr 1979	Feb 1980	—	W.J.B. Peat (acting)	Bolkiah Camp
3	Feb 1980	Jan 1982	Lieutenant Colonel	Abdul Aziz Abdullah	Bolkiah Camp
4	Jan 1982	Apr 1982	Lieutenant Colonel	Musa Yakub	Bolkiah Camp
5	Apr 1982	Apr 1984	Lieutenant Colonel	Husin Sulaiman	Bolkiah Camp
6	May 1984	May 1986	Lieutenant Colonel	Ishak Abdul Hamid	Bolkiah Camp
7	May 1986	Jun 1989	Lieutenant Colonel	Brahim Jumahat	Penanjong Garrison
8	Jun 1989	Nov 1989	Colonel	A. Jumat Zakaria	Penanjong Garrison
9	Nov 1989	Oct 1991	Colonel	Ramli Kampong	Penanjong Garrison
10	Oct 1991	Jul 1993	Lieutenant Colonel	Hashim Zainal Abidin	Penanjong Garrison
11	Jul 1993	Feb 1997	Colonel	Ahmad Yahya	Penanjong Garrison
12	Feb 1997	Jan 2001	Lieutenant Colonel	Abas Bagol	Penanjong Garrison
13	Jan 2001	Mar 2002	Colonel	Abdu'r Rahmani	Penanjong Garrison
14	Feb 2002	May 2005	Lieutenant Colonel	Muhammad Yaakub Bol Hassan	Penanjong Garrison
15	Jun 2005	Mar 2007	Lieutenant Colonel	Said Puteh	Penanjong Garrison
16	Apr 2007	Nov 2008	Major General	Aminuddin Ihsan	Penanjong Garrison
17	Dec 2008	May 2011	Major General	Mohammad Tawih	Penanjong Garrison
18	Jul 2011	Jul 2012	Colonel	Zulkifli Ismail	Penanjong Garrison
19	Jul 2012	Sep 2015	Lieutenant Colonel	Hasmee Abdul Wahab	Penanjong Garrison
20	Sep 2015	Jul 2016	Colonel	Abidin Abdul Hamid	Penanjong Garrison
21	Jul 2016	Jan 2018	Brigadier General	Khairul Hamed	Penanjong Garrison
22	Mar 2018	Dec 2018	Major General	Haszaimi Bol Hassan	Penanjong Garrison
23	Dec 2018	Oct 2020	Colonel	Mohammad Shafiee Duraman	Penanjong Garrison
24	Oct 2020	Apr 2022	Colonel	Haszahaidi Ahmad Daud	Penanjong Garrison
25	Apr 2022	present	Colonel	Pengiran Noor Rumaizi	Penanjong Garrison

== See also ==
- Defence Academy Royal Brunei Armed Forces — similar establishment for training RBAF commissioned officers
