= Orders, decorations, and medals of Brunei =

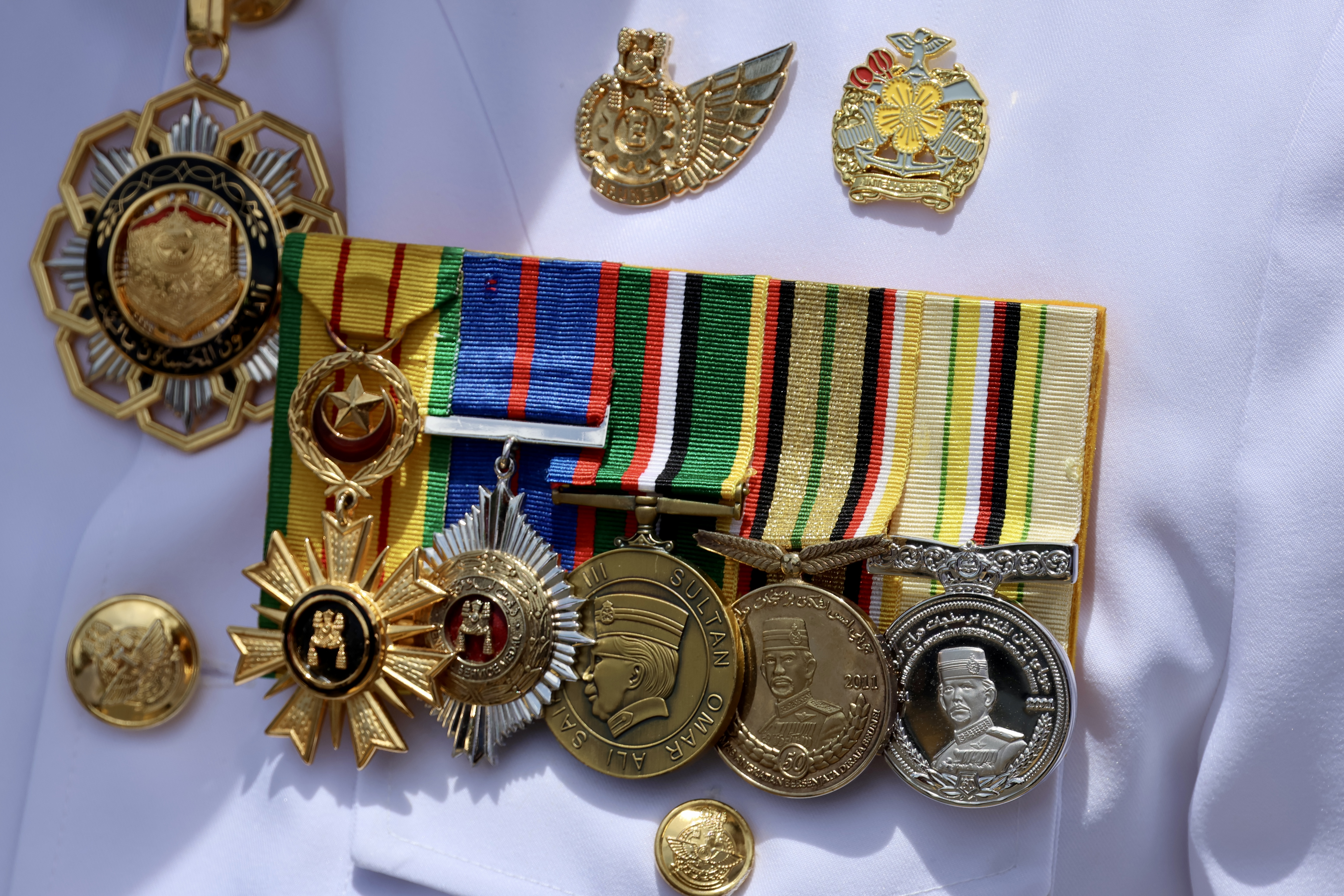
Orders, decorations, and medals on a military officer's ceremonial dress in 2024

The orders, decorations, and medals of Brunei consist of Bintang-Bintang Kebesaran (translatable as 'state decorations') and Pingat-Pingat Kehormatan (literally 'medals of honour'). Both are awarded by the Sultan of Brunei on the basis of merit, especially on the contributions to the country. The investiture of some of the state decorations also include the conferment of titles, whereby they become part of the awardees' personal names in official correspondence or when mentioned in formal media in the country. The decorations and medals are under the responsibility of Jabatan Adat Istiadat Negara, a government department under the Prime Minister's Office, which also oversees Bruneian royal traditions and protocol.

The insignia are displayed in the Royal Regalia Museum located in the capital.

== Investiture ==
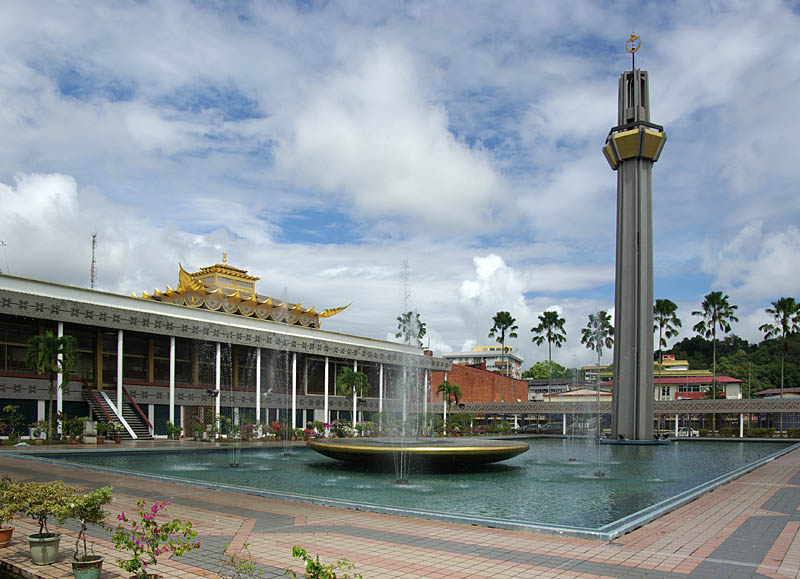
Lapau building in Bandar Seri Begawan's city centre

The actual investiture involves awardees being given badges in a ceremony by the Sultan or sometimes the Crown Prince upon the Sultan's discretion. The ceremony is traditionally held in Lapau which is a type of ceremonial hall for royal ceremonies in the Bruneian culture. At present, the state decorations to the third class are always conferred by Sultan Hassanal Bolkiah in a royal ceremony held annually on the day of the Sultan's birthday on 15 July at Balai Singgahsana Indera Buana, a ceremonial hall within Istana Nurul Iman, the Sultan's palace. Meanwhile, the state decorations of lower classes as well as medals of honour are conferred by the Sultan or the Crown Prince Al-Muhtadee Billah in other ceremonies on other days, although commonly held in conjunction with the said birthday celebration. They had been traditionally held at the Lapau building in Bandar Seri Begawan's city centre but in recent years they have been held at the Lapau hall within the palace instead to accommodate the growing number of awardees.

== Decorations and medals ==
The following are the lists of state decorations and medals of honour of Brunei. All of their names are styled in the Malay language, nevertheless many of the names have also been officially given the equivalents in English, that is by the Department of Adat Istiadat.

=== State decorations ===
Name in Malay	Official English translation	Ranks (letters)	Ribbon	Established	Founder	Awarded to/for/by	Ref.
Darjah Kerabat Mahkota Brunei Yang Amat Dihormati	The Most Esteemed Royal Family Order of the Crown of Brunei	Royal Recipient (DKMB)		15 August 1982	Hassanal Bolkiah	Members of the Brunei royal family and foreign royals.	
Darjah Kerabat Laila Utama Yang Amat Dihormati	The Most Esteemed Family Order of Laila Utama	Grand Recipient (DK l)		1954	Omar Ali Saifuddien III	Members of the Brunei royal family, princes from other countries, chiefs of state, and other deserving individuals.	
Darjah Kerabat Seri Utama Yang Amat Dihormati	The Most Esteemed Family Order of Seri Utama	Grand Recipient (DK ll)		1954	Omar Ali Saifuddien III	Members of the Brunei royal family, princes from other countries, chiefs of state, and other deserving individuals.	
Darjah Seri Ugama Islam Negara Brunei Yang Amat Bersinar	The Most Eminent Order of Islam Brunei	Grand Commander (PSSUB)		1 August 1968	Hassanal Bolkiah	To honour those who have promoted, preserved, and strengthened the Islamic faith in the nation.	
Darjah Seri Ugama Islam Negara Brunei Yang Amat Bersinar	The Most Eminent Order of Islam Brunei	Commander (DSSUB)		1 August 1968	Hassanal Bolkiah	To honour those who have promoted, preserved, and strengthened the Islamic faith in the nation.	
Darjah Seri Ugama Islam Negara Brunei Yang Amat Bersinar	The Most Eminent Order of Islam Brunei	Companion (SSUB)		1 August 1968	Hassanal Bolkiah	To honour those who have promoted, preserved, and strengthened the Islamic faith in the nation.	
Darjah Seri Ugama Islam Negara Brunei Yang Amat Bersinar	The Most Eminent Order of Islam Brunei	Officer (SUB)		1 August 1968	Hassanal Bolkiah	To honour those who have promoted, preserved, and strengthened the Islamic faith in the nation.	
Darjah Seri Ugama Islam Negara Brunei Yang Amat Bersinar	The Most Eminent Order of Islam Brunei	Member (PUB)		1 August 1968	Hassanal Bolkiah	To honour those who have promoted, preserved, and strengthened the Islamic faith in the nation.	
Darjah Paduka Laila Jasa Keberanian Gemilang Yang Amat Cemerlang	The Most Illustrious Order of Paduka Laila Jasa Keberanian Gemilang	Grand Commander (DPKG)		1 August 1968	Hassanal Bolkiah		
Darjah Paduka Laila Jasa Keberanian Gemilang Yang Amat Cemerlang	The Most Illustrious Order of Paduka Laila Jasa Keberanian Gemilang	Commander (DLKG)		1 August 1968	Hassanal Bolkiah		
Darjah Paduka Laila Jasa Keberanian Gemilang Yang Amat Cemerlang	The Most Illustrious Order of Paduka Laila Jasa Keberanian Gemilang	Companion (DKG)		1 August 1968	Hassanal Bolkiah		
Darjah Paduka Keberanian Laila Terbilang Yang Amat Gemilang	The Most Exalted Order of Paduka Keberanian Laila Terbilang	Grand Commander (DPKT)		1 August 1968	Hassanal Bolkiah	For distinguished services and gallantry by the armed forces.	
Darjah Paduka Keberanian Laila Terbilang Yang Amat Gemilang	The Most Exalted Order of Paduka Keberanian Laila Terbilang	Commander (DKLT)		1 August 1968	Hassanal Bolkiah	For distinguished services and gallantry by the armed forces.	
Darjah Paduka Keberanian Laila Terbilang Yang Amat Gemilang	The Most Exalted Order of Paduka Keberanian Laila Terbilang	Companion (DKT)		1 August 1968	Hassanal Bolkiah	For distinguished services and gallantry by the armed forces.	
Darjah Pahlawan Negara Brunei Yang Amat Perkasa	The Most Gallant Order of Pahlawan Negara Brunei	Grand Commander (PSPNB)		28 November 1959	Omar Ali Saifuddien III	Members of the armed forces who have displayed particularly valiant action.	
Darjah Pahlawan Negara Brunei Yang Amat Perkasa	The Most Gallant Order of Pahlawan Negara Brunei	Commander (DHPNB)		28 November 1959	Omar Ali Saifuddien III	Members of the armed forces who have displayed particularly valiant action.	
Darjah Pahlawan Negara Brunei Yang Amat Perkasa	The Most Gallant Order of Pahlawan Negara Brunei	Companion (PNB)		28 November 1959	Omar Ali Saifuddien III	Members of the armed forces who have displayed particularly valiant action.	
Darjah Pahlawan Negara Brunei Yang Amat Perkasa	The Most Gallant Order of Pahlawan Negara Brunei	Officer (PJB)		28 November 1959	Omar Ali Saifuddien III	Members of the armed forces who have displayed particularly valiant action.	
Darjah Setia Negara Brunei Yang Amat Berbahagia	The Most Blessed Order of Setia Negara Brunei	Grand Commander (PSNB)		29 November 1959	Omar Ali Saifuddien III	For committed, honourable, faithful, and exceptional service. It is given to non-military personnel.	
Darjah Setia Negara Brunei Yang Amat Berbahagia	The Most Blessed Order of Setia Negara Brunei	Commander (DSNB)		29 November 1959	Omar Ali Saifuddien III	For committed, honourable, faithful, and exceptional service. It is given to non-military personnel.	
Darjah Setia Negara Brunei Yang Amat Berbahagia	The Most Blessed Order of Setia Negara Brunei	Companion (SNB)		29 November 1959	Omar Ali Saifuddien III	For committed, honourable, faithful, and exceptional service. It is given to non-military personnel.	
Darjah Setia Negara Brunei Yang Amat Berbahagia	The Most Blessed Order of Setia Negara Brunei	Officer (PSB)		29 November 1959	Omar Ali Saifuddien III	For committed, honourable, faithful, and exceptional service. It is given to non-military personnel.	
Darjah Paduka Seri Laila Jasa Yang Amat Berjasa	The Most Distinguished Order of Paduka Seri Laila Jasa	Grand Commander (PSLJ)		February 1965	Omar Ali Saifuddien III	For meritorious and faithful services.	
Darjah Paduka Seri Laila Jasa Yang Amat Berjasa	The Most Distinguished Order of Paduka Seri Laila Jasa	Commander (DSLJ)		February 1965	Omar Ali Saifuddien III	For meritorious and faithful services.	
Darjah Paduka Seri Laila Jasa Yang Amat Berjasa	The Most Distinguished Order of Paduka Seri Laila Jasa	Companion (SLJ)		February 1965	Omar Ali Saifuddien III	For meritorious and faithful services.	
Darjah Seri Paduka Mahkota Brunei Yang Amat Mulia	The Most Honourable Order of Seri Paduka Mahkota Brunei	Grand Commander (SPMB)		1 March 1954	Omar Ali Saifuddien III	To honour those who have helped the Sultan in exceptional or significant ways.	
Darjah Seri Paduka Mahkota Brunei Yang Amat Mulia	The Most Honourable Order of Seri Paduka Mahkota Brunei	Commander (DPMB)		1 March 1954	Omar Ali Saifuddien III	To honour those who have helped the Sultan in exceptional or significant ways.	
Darjah Seri Paduka Mahkota Brunei Yang Amat Mulia	The Most Honourable Order of Seri Paduka Mahkota Brunei	Companion (SMB)		1 March 1954	Omar Ali Saifuddien III	To honour those who have helped the Sultan in exceptional or significant ways.	
Darjah Perwira Agong Negara Brunei Yang Amat Setia	The Most Faithful Order of Perwira Agong Negara Brunei	Officer (PANB)		28 November 1959	Omar Ali Saifuddien III	The nation's highest award for gallantry.	
Darjah Perwira Agong Negara Brunei Yang Amat Setia	The Most Faithful Order of Perwira Agong Negara Brunei	Member (PNB)		28 November 1959	Omar Ali Saifuddien III	The nation's highest award for gallantry.	

=== Medals of honour ===
Below is a list of the current medals of honour (Pingat-Pingat Kehormatan):

Name in Malay	Official English translation	Ranks (letters)	Ribbon	Established	Founder	Awarded to/for/by	Ref.
Pingat Omar Ali Saifuddin	Omar Ali Saifuddin Medal	First Class (POAS)		1955	Omar Ali Saifuddien III	For valuable and special services to the Sultan and state.	
Pingat Omar Ali Saifuddin	Omar Ali Saifuddin Medal	Second Class (POAS)		1955	Omar Ali Saifuddien III	For valuable and special services to the Sultan and state.	
Pingat Hassanal Bolkiah Sultan	Sultan Hassanal Bolkiah Medal	First Class		1968	Hassanal Bolkiah	For special and loyal service to the Sultan.	
Pingat Hassanal Bolkiah Sultan	Sultan Hassanal Bolkiah Medal	Second Class		1968	Hassanal Bolkiah	For special and loyal service to the Sultan.	
Pingat Bakti Laila Ikhlas	–	Recipient (PBLI)		1975	Hassanal Bolkiah	For meritorious service in the armed forces over a period of 20 years.	
Pingat Jasa Kebaktian	Meritorious Service Medal	Recipient (PJK)		1954	Omar Ali Saifuddien III	Awarded for service of conspicuous merit to the state, such service being characterised by resource and devotion to duty including prolonged service marked by exceptional ability, merit and exemplary conduct.	
Pingat Tabah Kerja Laila Lutanan	Government Office Medal	Recipient (PTKL)		–	–	For 15 years of government service.	
Pingat Indah Kerja Baik	Excellent Service Medal	Recipient (PIKB)		–	–	To civilian personnel for meritorious service to the state.	
Pingat Pengisytiharan Kemerdekaan	Proclamation of Independence of Brunei Medal	Recipient		1 January 1984	Hassanal Bolkiah	To mark the independence of the State of Brunei.	
Pingat Kerja Lama	Long Service Medal	Recipient (PKL)		1954	Omar Ali Saifuddien III	For a minimum of eighteen years’ blameless service and may be awarded to both civilians and military.	
Pingat Perjuangan	Campaign Medal	First Class		1962	Omar Ali Saifuddien III	For campaign service.	
Pingat Perjuangan	Campaign Medal	Second Class		1962	Omar Ali Saifuddien III	For campaign service.	
Pahlawan Periwara	Star of Supreme Gallantry	Recipient (PP)		1972	Hassanal Bolkiah	For supreme valour in the face of the enemy.	
Asgar Pahlawan	Distinguished Warrior Star	Recipient (AP)		1972	Hassanal Bolkiah	For conspicuous gallantry in the face of the enemy.	
Penglima Lasgar	Distinguished Soldier Star	Recipient (PL)		1972	Hassanal Bolkiah	For bravery in the field.	

==== Medals related to national events ====
There are also several medals which are awarded in conjunction with certain national events:

Name in Malay	Official English translation	Class	Ribbon
Pingat Pertalaban Ahmad Tajuddin	Ahmad Tajuddin Coronation Medal	–	
Pingat Pertalaban Omar Ali Saifuddin	Omar Ali Saifuddin Coronation Medal	–	
Pingat Puspa	Coronation Medal	Gold	
Pingat Puspa	Coronation Medal	Silver	
Pingat Jubli Menaiki Takhta: Pingat Jubli Emas; Pingat Jubli Perak	Jubilee Medal Ascension to the Throne: Golden Jubilee Medal; Silver Jubilee Medal	Gold	
Pingat Jubli Menaiki Takhta: Pingat Jubli Emas; Pingat Jubli Perak	Jubilee Medal Ascension to the Throne: Golden Jubilee Medal; Silver Jubilee Medal	Silver	
Pingat Jubli Menaiki Takhta: Pingat Jubli Emas; Pingat Jubli Perak	Jubilee Medal Ascension to the Throne: Golden Jubilee Medal; Silver Jubilee Medal	Bronze	
Pingat Jubli Hari Kebangsaan: Pingat Jubli Perak	National Day Jubilee Medal: Silver Jubilee Medal	–	

==== Medals for armed forces of Brunei ====
The following are the medals of honour specifically for the armed forces of Brunei:

Medals of the Royal Brunei Police Force
Name in Malay	Official English translation	Ribbon	Post-nominal letters
Pingat Laila Tugas	General Service Medal		–
Pingat Perkhidmatan Polis	Police Service Medal		–
Pingat Kerja Lama Polis	Police Long Service Medal		PKLP
Pingat Polis Diraja Brunei 1965	Royal Police Medal 1965		–
Pingat Polis 50 Tahun	Police Golden Jubilee Medal		–
Pingat Polis 75 Tahun	Police 75 Years Medal		–
Pingat Polis 100 Tahun	Royal Brunei Police Centennial Medal		–

Medals of the Royal Brunei Armed Forces
Name in Malay	Official English translation	Ribbon	Post-nominal letters
Pingat Mulia Gelaran Resemi	Inauguration Medal		–
Pingat Laila Tugas	General Service Medal		GSM
Pingat Kerja Lama dan Perangai Baik	Long Service and Good Conduct Medal		PKLPB
Pingat Jubli Perak 25 Tahun Angkatan Bersenjata Diraja Brunei	Royal Brunei Armed Forces Silver Jubilee Medal		–
Pingat Jubli Emas 50 Tahun Angkatan Bersenjata Diraja Brunei	Royal Brunei Armed Forces Golden Jubilee Medal		–
Pingat Jubli Intan 60 Tahun Angkatan Bersenjata Diraja Brunei	Royal Brunei Armed Forces Diamond Jubilee Medal		–

Medals of the Gurkha Reserve Unit
Name in Malay	Official English translation	Ribbon
Pingat Pasukan Simpanan Gurkha	Gurkha Reserve Unit Medal	
Pingat Kerja Lama dan Perangai Baik	Long Service Medal and Good Conduct	
Pingat Jubli Emas Pasukan Simpanan Gurkha	Gurkha Reserve Unit Golden Jubilee Medal	

== Foreign honours ==
British awards granted in Brunei generally fall into two main categories. The first category comprises honorary awards given to the Sultan and senior officials, while the second includes ordinary awards granted to British officials and advisors residing in Brunei. Additionally, some native Borneans may have received the General Service Medal and campaign medals, featuring clasps for "Brunei" and "Borneo" respectively, in recognition of their services during the period from 1962 to 1966.
