= Britain–India–Nepal Tripartite Agreement =

1947 treaty between the United Kingdom, India and Nepal

The Tripartite Agreement between the United Kingdom, India and Nepal is a treaty signed in 1947 concerning the rights of Gurkhas recruited in military services of United Kingdom and India. This agreement does not apply to Gurkhas employed in the Nepalese Army. Under the agreement, six of the ten Gurkha regiments remained as part of the Indian Army, while the remaining four joined the British Army. As of 2020, India has 39 Gorkha battalions serving in 7 Gorkha regiments. Those transferred to the British Army were posted to other remaining British colonies. In Malaya and Singapore, their presence was required in the Malayan Emergency, and they were to replace the Sikh unit in Singapore which reverted to the Indian Army on Indian independence. Those units in Malaya (Malaysia and Brunei) and Singapore, after these British colonies gained independence, are still part of Brunei and Singapore armed forces respectively.

== Background ==
From the first quarter of the 19th century, Gurkhas from Nepal had served under the British, first in the armies of the East India Company, and then the British Indian Army. The terms and conditions of service for the Gurkhas were solely a matter for the British Indian authorities, without reference to the British Government in London.

In 1947, India became independent from the United Kingdom, and it was decided between the two governments to split the Gurkha regiments between the British and Indian armies — six Gurkha units became part of the new Indian Army, while four were transferred to the British Army:

Indian Army	British Army
1st King George V's Own Gurkha Rifles (The Malaun Regiment)	2nd King Edward VII's Own Gurkha Rifles (The Sirmoor Rifles)
3rd Queen Alexandra's Own Gurkha Rifles	6th Gurkha Rifles
4th Prince of Wales's Own Gurkha Rifles	7th Gurkha Rifles
5th Royal Gurkha Rifles (Frontier Force)	10th Gurkha Rifles
8th Gurkha Rifles	
9th Gurkha Rifles	

As a part of this arrangement, it was agreed that Gurkhas in British and Indian service should enjoy broadly the same conditions of service, to ensure that there was no unfair advantage to serving in one or other, thus maintaining economic stability and social harmony in the Gurkha recruiting areas. Thus, the governments of the United Kingdom, India and Nepal came to sign the Tripartite Agreement (TPA).

== Main terms ==
The main points of the agreement are:

- The Gurkha soldier must be recruited as a Nepali citizen, must serve as a Nepali citizen, and must be resettled as a Nepali citizen.
- All religious and cultural observances must be preserved in accordance with the demands of the Hindu faith.
- Gurkha soldiers in both the Indian and British Armies should receive the same basic rates of pay, although allowances may be paid to reflect differences in the costs of living between countries where Gurkha soldiers might serve outside Nepal.
- Subject to satisfactory performance and conduct, all soldiers should be allowed to serve for sufficient time in order to qualify for a pension.
- All Gurkha soldiers should be allowed an extended period of leave in Nepal every three years.
- Gurkha soldiers recruited into the respective armies are liable for service worldwide.
- Gurkhas are fully integrated into the Army to which they are recruited and under no circumstances are they to be considered mercenaries.

The agreement applies to the 3,500 Gurkhas serving in the British Army, and close to 40,000 Gurkhas in the Indian Army. It does not apply to Gurkhas in the Nepalese Army.

The TPA underpins the unique terms and conditions of service of the Gurkha soldier which in a number of key areas differ markedly from those of his British or Commonwealth counterpart. Such differences arise because of the need to maintain broad comparability with certain Indian Army conditions of service, to protect the Gurkha national, religious, cultural and domicile status and the need for Gurkhas to maintain close links with Nepal throughout their service. It is against this background that the UK Government has continued to maintain separate terms and conditions of service for Gurkhas.

=== New Gurkha Conditions and Terms of Service in British Army ===
The maintenance of different terms and conditions for Gurkha soldiers as opposed to their British counterparts has been a source of friction in recent years, particularly in regard to pension provision. While Gurkha pensions provide a high standard of living in Nepal, they were calculated at a fraction of the pensions provided to British soldiers. As a consequence, in January 2005, the British Government announced a review of Gurkha terms and conditions to attempt to rectify these inequalities. In May 2007, a new set of proposals was adopted, with a number of points in different areas:

- Nationality and Status
  - Gurkhas should be recruited as Nepalese subjects, and should remain so throughout their service.
  - Gurkhas should only be recruited to units of the Brigade of Gurkhas, and these should remain predominantly Gurkha manned.
- Recruitment and Selection
  - Recruitment should remain in Nepal.
  - Recruitment should become the responsibility of the Army Recruitment and Training Division.
  - Nepalese women should be recruited into the Brigade of Gurkhas.
- Pay, Pensions and Allowances
  - Gurkha pay should be brought into line with UK pay rates based on employment qualifications.
  - All Gurkhas recruited after a specific date will join the standard Armed Forces Pension Scheme. Those recruited before that date will be given the option of remaining in the Gurkha Pension Scheme or transferring to the AFPS.

A major proposal is the drawing up of a bilateral memorandum of understanding between the governments of Britain and Nepal, and allowing the TPA to lie. It is unclear how this would affect the recruitment of Gurkhas in the Indian Army.

== See also ==
- Gorkha regiments (India), seven regiments
- Gurkha Contingent (Singapore)
- Gurkha Reserve Unit (Brunei)
- Gurkha Regiment (United Kingdom)
  - Brigade of Gurkhas
  - Royal Gurkha Rifles
