= Royal Brunei Armed Forces =

Military of Brunei

- Angkatan Bersenjata Diraja Brunei رويال بروناي آرمد فوس
- Royal Brunei Armed Forces badge

- Brunei Darussalam ensign
- Founded: 31 May 1961; 65 years ago, as Brunei Malay Regiment
- Current form: 1 January 1984; 42 years ago
- Service branches: Royal Brunei Land Force; Royal Brunei Navy; Royal Brunei Air Force
- Headquarters: Bolkiah Garrison, Bandar Seri Begawan, Berakas 'A', BB3510, Brunei Darussalam
- Website: MinDef.gov.bn

Leadership
- Supreme Commander: Hassanal Bolkiah
- Minister of Defence: Hassanal Bolkiah
- Commander Deputy Commander: Major General Haszaimi Bol Hassan Brigadier General (U) Mohammad Sharif Ibrahim
- Armed Forces Sergeant Major: Warrant Officer 1 Rozain Pungut

Personnel
- Military age: 18
- Conscription: no
- Active personnel: 7,200
- Reserve personnel: 10,000

Expenditure
- Budget: B$796.3 million $594 million (FY 2024/2025)
- Percent of GDP: 3.56% (2024)

Related articles
- Ranks: Military ranks of Brunei

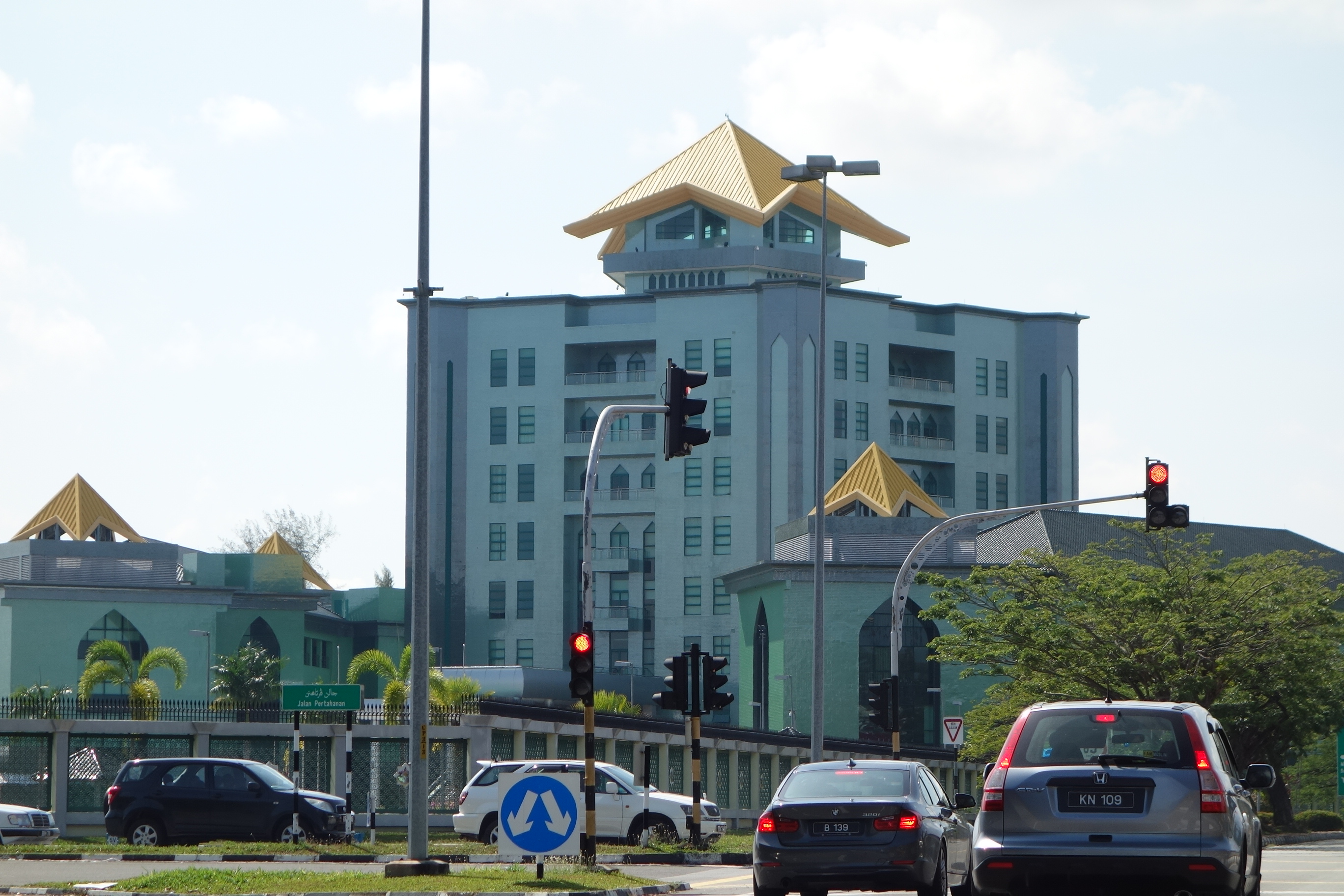
Ministry of Defence Brunei Darussalam headquarters located within Bolkiah Garrison, 2015.

The Royal Brunei Armed Forces (RBAF; Malay: Angkatan Bersenjata Diraja Brunei (ABDB) Jawi: رويال بروناي آرمد فوس) is the official organisation and collective term for all of the military forces or service branches of the sultanate of Brunei Darussalam. The RBAF consists of three primary military branches; the Royal Brunei Land Force (RBLF / TDDB), the Royal Brunei Navy (RBN / TLDB), and the Royal Brunei Air Force (RBAirF / TUDB).

The supreme commander of the RBAF is held by the Sultan of Brunei, currently Sultan Hassanal Bolkiah, holding the rank of field marshal. Its professional head is known as the Commander of the Royal Brunei Armed Forces, holding the rank of major general, its incumbent is Haszaimi Bol Hassan. The RBAF are controlled and managed by the Ministry of Defence Brunei Darussalam (MinDef), from their headquarters within Bolkiah Garrison.

The forerunner to the RBAF, the Brunei Malay Regiment, was formed on 31 May 1961; 65 years ago, with British military support, and has continued to include officers on loan from the British military. 31 May is annually marked as Armed Forces Day.

== History ==
=== Brunei Malay Regiment ===
The forerunner to the Royal Brunei Armed Forces was originally called the Brunei Malay Regiment (BMR), Malay: Askar Melayu Brunei (AMB), Jawi: بروناي ملايو ريجيمن. It faced a significant challenge during its establishment, due to the Brunei revolt on the night of 7–8 December 1962. This uprising highlighted the need for stronger national security, prompting the government to expedite the development of a more robust defence force. Despite this urgency, the trained Brunei Malay Regiment members were restricted to their camp during the insurrection, missing the chance to prove their effectiveness. In response, the United Kingdom deployed its own forces, including the Gurkhas, to Brunei Darussalam.

Brunei Malay Regiment personnel continued their training in the Federation of Malaya during 1963 without issues. Malaya Deputy Prime Minister Tun Abdul Razak hoped Brunei Darussalam would send more soldiers, enough to form a battalion. Recruitment for additional enlisted soldiers, aged 18 to 25, took place in May, and Brunei Darussalam also called for volunteers for short-service commissions in December. Selected candidates from Segenting Camp at Port Dickson underwent a six-week officer cadet training programme at the Federation Military College in Sungai Besi. By the end of 1963, the regiment's strength had reached 410 personnel. When Brunei Darussalam declined an invitation to join the Federation of Malaya in August 1963, Malaya withdrew its personnel from Brunei Darussalam, affecting the capability of the Brunei Malay Regiment. Additionally, the abrupt withdrawal from Malayan training sites also posed some issues for Brunei Darussalam, although backup plans were in place.

By early 1964, it became clear that the Royal Malay Regiment could no longer provide officers, trainers, or services for Brunei Darussalam. Despite this, the initial phase of Brunei's Berakas Camp was nearly complete. Lieutenant Colonel D.M. Fletcher replaced the Malayan commanding officer of the Brunei Malay Regiment. British Army troops on secondment filled the adjutant (Adj) and regimental sergeant major (RSM) positions. On 2 May 1964, the Brunei Malay Regiment moved from Segenting Camp to their new permanent headquarters at Berakas Camp. By the end of the year, the Brunei Malay Regiment was ready to take on many internal security duties previously handled by British Forces Brunei (BFB) personnel. Although specific details were not disclosed, Major General Dato Walter confirmed on 11 July 1964, that the Brunei Malay Regiment was now operational within the state. Mid-year, the Sultan named the new encampment Bolkiah Camp, designed to house the Brigade Headquarters, support troops, and accommodate 700 to 800 personnel.

=== Royal Brunei Malay Regiment ===
In 1965, the Brunei Malay Regiment was further strengthened and officially became the Royal Brunei Malay Regiment (RBMR), Malay: Askar Melayu Diraja Brunei (AMDB), Jawi: رجمنت مالاى برونائى رويال. On 31 May 1965, the Sultan bestowed the title 'Royal' (Diraja) at its fourth-anniversary parade. The Royal Brunei Malay Regiment's expansion continued in 1966, despite Malaysia's temporary halt in providing military training to Brunei Darussalam. However, rifle companies did train in Kota Belud in February and March. During the regiment's fifth-anniversary celebrations in Brunei Darussalam, it was presented with the Royal Colours, which remained until 31 May 1971, when they were replaced. Around this time, British officers began transferring some of their duties to local officers, with Captain Mohammad being appointed as Adjutant. In October, soldiers from the regiment's number 6 and 9 platoons conducted small-scale operations in Bukit Belalong, Temburong District, capturing four North Kalimantan National Army (TNKU) members who had infiltrated from Sarawak. The following year, on 18 April, the Sultan honoured several troops, including Second Lieutenant Musa and Second Lieutenant Hussien, at an investiture ceremony at Istana Darul Hana.

In 1967, the headgear emblem and shoulder titles of the Royal Brunei Malay Regiment were updated from black and white backgrounds to new green and gold colours. Operational dress code changes included adopting the olive green (OG) shirt and trousers design from the British Army, with flashes worn on jungle helmets instead of company colours. A new advancement policy for Brunei Darussalam commissioned officers, modelled after the British Army system, was implemented. Three local officers, Captain Sulaiman, Captain Awangku Ibnu, and Captain Mohammad, attended a three-month advanced course in small arms and tactics at the School of Infantry in Warminster, Wiltshire, England. Upon completion, they were to attach to an infantry brigade in England, and then spend a month each with three different British Army of the Rhine (BAOR) battalions in West Germany.

On 7 April 1969, the Royal Brunei Malay Regiment established a Training Wing, marking the beginning of significant growth. By the end of the year, the regiment had reorganised and expanded to 928 soldiers. Bolkiah Camp became home to an independent training facility, with administrative components of Berakas Camp combined under a new headquarters wing. A trial army cadet programme in secondary schools was introduced, turning these schools into a source of prospective recruits. On the regiment's fourteenth anniversary, the 2nd Battalion Royal Brunei Malay Regiment (2Bn RBMR) was formed after nearly two years of training. In 1976, a major recruiting campaign was launched to fill the ranks of the specialised Gurkha Reserve Unit (GRU); created from former British Gurkha troops. Additionally, in 1981, the Women's Company (Malay: Kompeni Askar Wanita, literally 'Women's Soldier Company') of the Royal Brunei Malay Regiment was established, with Pengiran Isteri Hajah Mariam serving as its Colonel-in-Chief.

Due to Britain's planned military withdrawal, Brunei Darussalam's defence strategies evolved significantly from 1979 to 1984, leading up to its independence from the United Kingdom (Brunei Darussalam then became a member of the British Commonwealth in 1984). The British withdrawal was scheduled for 1979, marking a critical juncture with the signing of the 1979 Treaty of Friendship and Cooperation between Brunei Darussalam and the United Kingdom. In response, Brunei Darussalam accelerated the acquisition of advanced military weaponry, and increased military spending to strengthen the Royal Brunei Malay Regiment and prepare it for independence from British rule.

=== Royal Brunei Armed Forces ===
On 1 January 1984; 42 years ago, the Royal Brunei Malay Regiment officially adopted its now current name, the Royal Brunei Armed Forces (RBAF), Malay: Angkatan Bersenjata Diraja Brunei (ABDB), Jawi: رايول بروناي آرميد فوس, coinciding with Brunei's independence from the United Kingdom. Brunei Darussalam reorganised its military administration and bureaucracy, placing oversight of the defence system under the Ministry of Defence Brunei Darussalam (MinDef). By 1984, the Royal Brunei Armed Forces comprised 3,900 enlisted ranks personnel, an increase of 400 from 1982. The RBAF unified its land, sea, and air forces into a single, cohesive management organisation. The RBAF's training and support services included the Women's Company, the Training Centre, Medical and Dental Services, the Logistics Depot, the Procurement Branch, Engineer Workshops, the Provost Unit, the Fire Service, and the RBAF band. In 1987, the establishment of the Royal Brunei Malay Reserve Regiment (RBMRU / ASMDB) significantly bolstered personnel numbers.

In the late 1990s, defence spending in Brunei Darussalam declined from its previous peak levels, but stabilised at around 3% of gross domestic product (GDP). As of 1 October 1991, the Royal Brunei Armed Forces was structured into five major formations; three traditional combat military branches (army, navy, and air force), and two military support units, those being: the Royal Brunei Land Force (RBLF), the Royal Brunei Navy (RBN), and the Royal Brunei Air Force (RBAirF), together with the RBAF Support Services (RBAF SS), and the Training Institute RBAF (TI RBAF). By the fiscal year ending in March 2002, Brunei Darussalam had spent B$1.5 billion (US$870 million) on British-made weapons, making it the second-largest buyer of such weapons outside the Middle East, and spending nearly five times more than Malaysia. In May 2001, the Royal Brunei Armed Forces introduced its mission statement, 'Vision in the 21st Century', coinciding with the 40th anniversary of its formation. Despite having only around 5,000 soldiers, Brunei Darussalam's defence spending remained disproportionately high at the beginning of the millennium.

== Organisation ==
=== Service branches ===
Overseen by Joint Force Headquarters, Royal Brunei Armed Forces (JFHQ RBAF; Malay: Markas Angkatan Bersama, Angkatan Bersenjata Diraja Brunei), headquartered at Bolkiah Garrison, the RBAF consists of three primary service branches operating within the sovereign nation of Brunei Darussalam.

==== Royal Brunei Land Force ====
The Royal Brunei Land Force (RBLF), Tentera Darat Diraja Brunei (TDDB), رويال بروناي لاند فورس, is a brigade-sized army formation. Headquartered at Berakas Garrison, it consists of three operational battalions (First Battalion RBLF, Second Battalion RBLF, and Third Battalion RBLF), along with a fourth Support Battalion RBLF. The role of the Royal Brunei Land Force is to maintain the security of Brunei Darussalam, and to defend the sovereignty of the country. Its main responsibility is to oppose any threat from within or outside the country, and to maintain peace and security in the country. The Royal Brunei Land Force is the largest of the three armed service branches of Brunei Darussalam.

==== Royal Brunei Navy ====
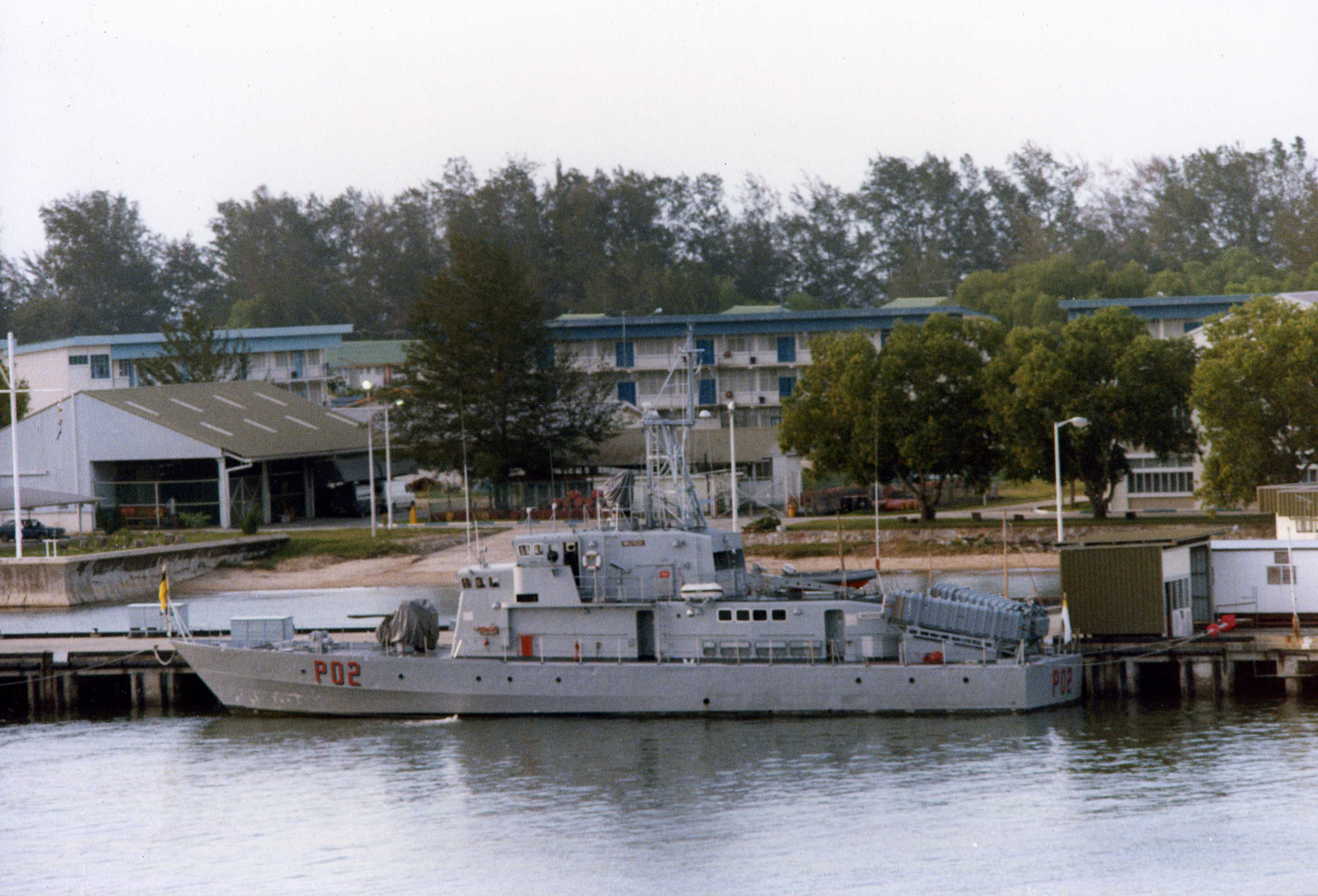
KDB Waspada docked at Muara Naval Base in 2007.

The Royal Brunei Navy (RBN), Tentera Laut Diraja Brunei (TLDB), رايل بروناي نافي, is the naval defence force of Brunei Darussalam. It is a small, but relatively well-equipped maritime force, whose main responsibility is to conduct search and rescue (SAR) missions, and to deter and defend the Bruneian sovereign waters against attack mounted by sea-borne forces. Headquartered at Muara Naval Base, as of 2023, the Royal Brunei Navy has an operational inventory of twenty ships or similar surface vessels; the RBN does not operate any submarines or submersibles.

==== Royal Brunei Air Force ====
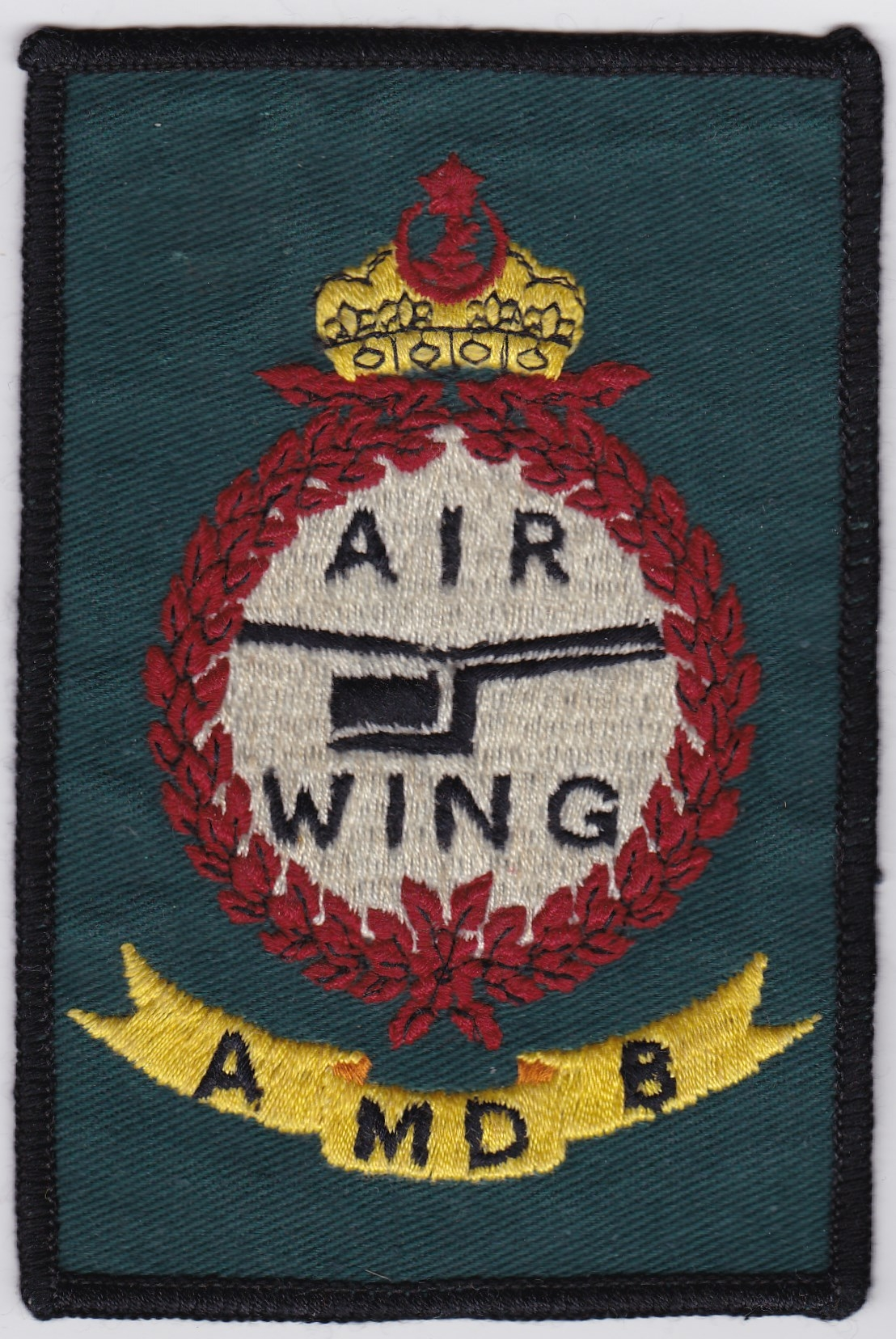
Patch of the former Air Wing, AMBD; forerunner of the Royal Brunei Air Force.

The Royal Brunei Air Force (RBAirF), Tentera Udara Diraja Brunei (TUDB), رويال بروناي اير فورس, is a small, primarily rotary-wing aircraft-based air force, which is tasked with supporting the other branches of the armed services, defending Bruneian air space, and carrying out search and rescue (SAR) operations. It was originally created in 1965, as the Air Wing of the Royal Brunei Malay Regiment (RBMR / AMDB), and was established as an independent air force on 1 October 1991. Headquartered and stationed at Royal Brunei Air Force Base, Rimba, the RBAirF main inventory consists of a range of helicopters; formerly ten Bell 212, four Sikorsky S-70A-14 (now transferred as a gift to the Royal Malaysian Air Force), and a solitary Bell 214ST. The Bell 212 and S-70A-14 aircraft were replaced between 2013 and 2015 by twelve Poland-manufactured Sikorsky S-70i Blackhawk. Two Bell 206 helicopters are used for rotary-wing training.

In 2023, the Royal Brunei Air Force fixed-wing inventory was limited to four Swiss-built Pilatus PC-7 Mk.II turboprop tandem-seat training aircraft (three of which are also used by the Alap-Alap Formation aerobatic display team), and a solitary Indonesian-built IPTN CN 235-110M (TUDB 501) aerial troop and cargo transport aircraft. On 14 July 2014, the Commander of the Royal Brunei Armed Forces announced plans to order the Lockheed Martin C-130J Super Hercules in the near future, though this never materialised. Subsequently, an order for four new Airbus C295MW was placed in December 2022 with European manufacturer Airbus Defence and Space; the first being accepted in December 2023, and the first two (TUDB 502 and TUDB 503) arriving at Rimba in January 2024. As of January 2024, the Royal Brunei Air Force operates twenty-two manned aircraft and four unmanned aerial vehicles (UAV).

=== Support Services ===
The former Support Services of the Royal Brunei Armed Forces (SS RBAF) had the responsibility of providing support services to units within the RBAF, in all aspects pertaining to their administration, security, health, logistics, communication, transportation, and technical equipment service support. The SS RBAF also worked closely with other units of all service branches in the Royal Brunei Armed Forces to undergo and help co-ordinate military training and operations. As part of the reorganisation of the entire Royal Brunei Armed Forces, the Support Services was disbanded in early 2009, and its various units were relocated.

=== Bands ===
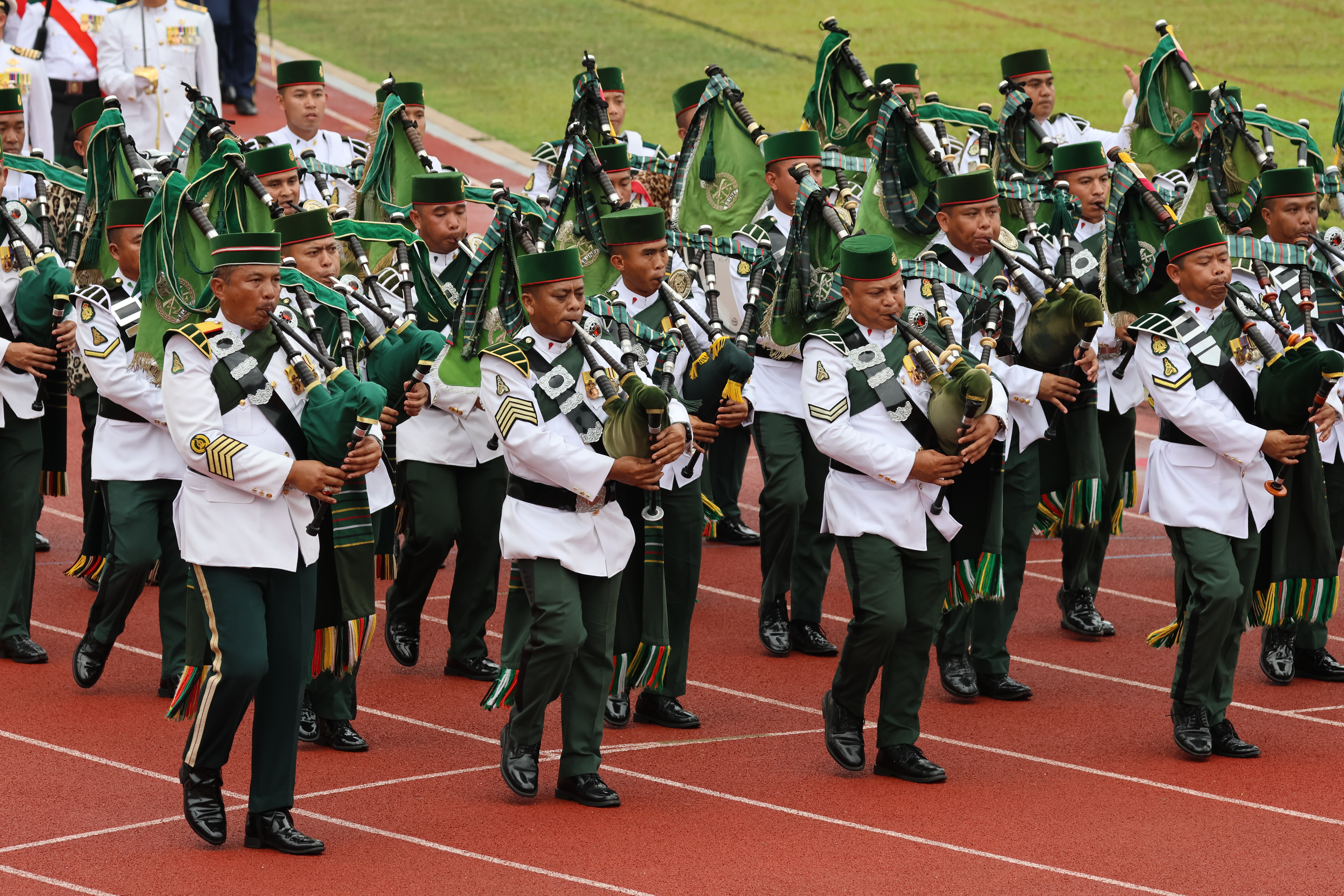
Members of the Royal Brunei Armed Forces Band marching at the National Day celebration in 2023.

The Royal Brunei Armed Forces Band (RBAF Band) was established on 31 May 1962, at Port Dickson in Malaysia. It originally had twenty-one members, and was then badged as the regimental band of the Brunei Malay Regiment. On 1 January 1984, Major Haji Manaf bin Kamis became the first local musician to be appointed Director of Music. Kamis was the judge at a competition which chose the official anthem of ASEAN. Since 2003, the band has been led by Major Jaya bin Metussin. Along with its official military engagements, it has participated in events such as the Edinburgh Military Tattoo, the Brunei Darussalam International Tattoo, and the Berlin Military Music Festival. The RBAF Band first participated in the Hari Merdeka celebrations and the Kuala Lumpur International Tattoo in Malaysia in 2007, and has since become a regular participant.

The 2nd and 3rd Battalion Royal Brunei Land Force Pipes and Drums are also part of the larger RBAF Band, and are modelled on those of the British Army Brigade of Gurkhas, which has a battalion stationed in rotation in Brunei Darussalam. Bands are also maintained in the Royal Brunei Navy and the Royal Brunei Air Force.

Affiliated to the RBAF Band is the Band of the Armed Forces Military Cadet Corps.

=== Training establishments ===
The Royal Brunei Armed Forces and its three service branches is supported by two permanent training establishments. Each service branch also have their own specialist training schools.

==== Training Institute ====
The Training Institute Royal Brunei Armed Forces (TI RBAF), Institut Latihan Angkatan Bersenjata Diraja Brunei (IL ABDB), is also known as the Military Training Institution. It is headquartered at and based within Penanjong Garrison, at Pekan Tutong in the Tutong District, TA2741, Brunei Darussalam. The TI RBAF conducts basic military training to all new recruits to the Royal Brunei Armed Forces (for all service branches). Other military courses are also offered and conducted in the institution to personnel of the Royal Brunei Armed Forces.

==== Defence Academy ====
The Royal Brunei Armed Forces Defence Academy (RBAF DA), Akademi Pertahanan Angkatan Bersenjata Diraja Brunei (AP ABDB), is headquartered and located at Kampong Tanah Jambu, Mentiri, in the Brunei-Muara District, BU1129, Brunei Darussalam. It provides initial officer training (IOT) to all prospective persons seeking to be a commissioned officer in the Royal Brunei Armed Forces (including its three service branches). The Defence Academy also offers staff officer courses, along with seminars and further learning to commissioned officers who have been promoted to senior officer ranks.

== Recruitment ==
Only Bruneian citizens of the Malay ethnicity (Bumiputera) are allowed to enlist in the Royal Brunei Armed Forces. The Malay ethnicity comprises the Belait, Bisaya, Brunei, Dusun, Kedayan, Murut, and Tutong indigenous races, as defined in the 1959 Constitution of Brunei Darussalam. Military service is not compulsory for any segment of the population; there is no conscription, it is entirely voluntary. Both women and men work equally in the Bruneian military.

=== Cadets ===
There are two separate types of uniformed youth cadet in Brunei Darussalam which are linked or affiliated to the Royal Brunei Armed Forces; both with seemingly similar names.

The Royal Brunei Armed Forces (RBAF) Military Cadet should not be confused with the RBAF Military Cadets of Higher Institutions (not officially members, from the University Islam Sultan Sharif Ali (UNISSA), University Brunei Darussalam (UBD), Institute Technology Brunei (ITB), and Brunei Polytechnic (PB)) despite sharing the same name. The two are visually identified by the uniforms they wear; the higher institutions wear the older disruptive pattern material (DMP) woodland camouflage, while the official Military Cadets wear the newer multi-scale digital camouflage.

=== Women's Company ===
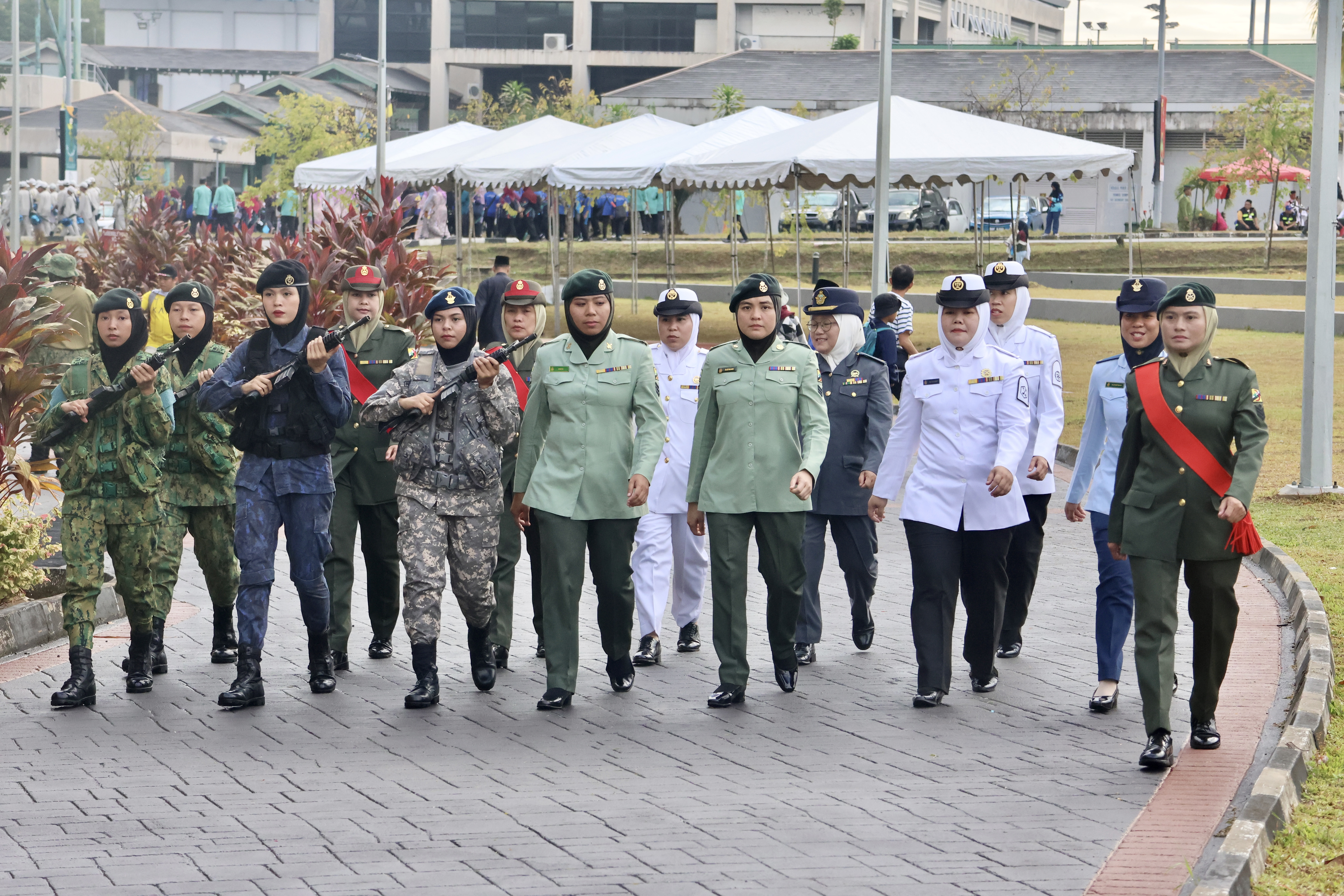
Women in the three branches of the Royal Brunei Armed Forces in 2024.

The Women's Company (PAW) was founded on 29 June 1981, to commemorate the Royal Brunei Armed Forces' 20th anniversary. One civilian clerk and five female loan service employees from the British Army were initially involved. There were twenty-eight women in the inaugural intake; six of them were officer cadets, and the other twenty-two were enlisted recruits. The twenty-two recruits received training at the Women's Company Training Centre, Bolkiah Garrison, conducted by officers from the Women's Royal Army Corps (WRAC) and multiple Royal Brunei Armed Forces male instructors, while the officer cadets were sent to the Woman's Royal Army Corps College in Camberley, Surrey, United Kingdom, for an eight-month course. Five of the six officer cadets in this ground-breaking class completed their military education, and were commissioned as second lieutenants. These officers served as Recruit Platoon Officers in the Women's Company Headquarters of the Royal Australian Air Force (RAAF).

The female cadets received instruction in fundamentals such as physical endurance, small weapons training, yearly shooting drills, and parade drill. The course also covered courses on parachute jumping in Singapore, counselling and guidance at Universiti Brunei Darussalam, air technician and map reading instructor courses in the United Kingdom, dental technician courses in Australia and Malaysia, midwifery and medical orderly courses in Hong Kong and Singapore, signals and navigation courses, physical training instructor courses in the United Kingdom, driving, cooking, logistics, and storekeeping courses, as well as information technology courses.

Within the Royal Brunei Armed Forces, the trained female soldiers held a variety of positions; including those of engineers, instructors, legal officers, intelligence officers, information technology specialists, administrators, and financial officers. They also worked as radio and telex operators, cooks, store assistants, medical and dental orderlies, safety harness fitters, and radar plotters. Increasing the number of ranks for women allowed for the discharge of more male troops for front-line work. Women's Company took actions that would increase their value and worth in the sport, intellectual, military, and skill domains. The Women's Company has also accomplished noteworthy activities; such participating in national and international events that the nation has hosted, including the 1999 SEA Games, where local women athletes won medals and honours.

The Women's Company has also organised and executed charity events as part of its extensive involvement in welfare and community engagement activities. In particular, the most isolated areas in the nation have benefited from the medical assistance and relief offered by its medical and dental officers and orderlies. Even though the ratio of women-to-men joining the Royal Brunei Armed Forces is low, the RBAF female cohort have made a valuable contribution.

The RBAF Supreme Commander approved the introduction of new uniforms for the Women's Company on 31 May 2005. Alumnus of the Women's Company, Hasimah Abu Bakar became the first female lieutenant colonel in 2006, and Norsuriati Sharbini became the first woman to be appointed to colonel in 2021.

== Equipment and operations ==
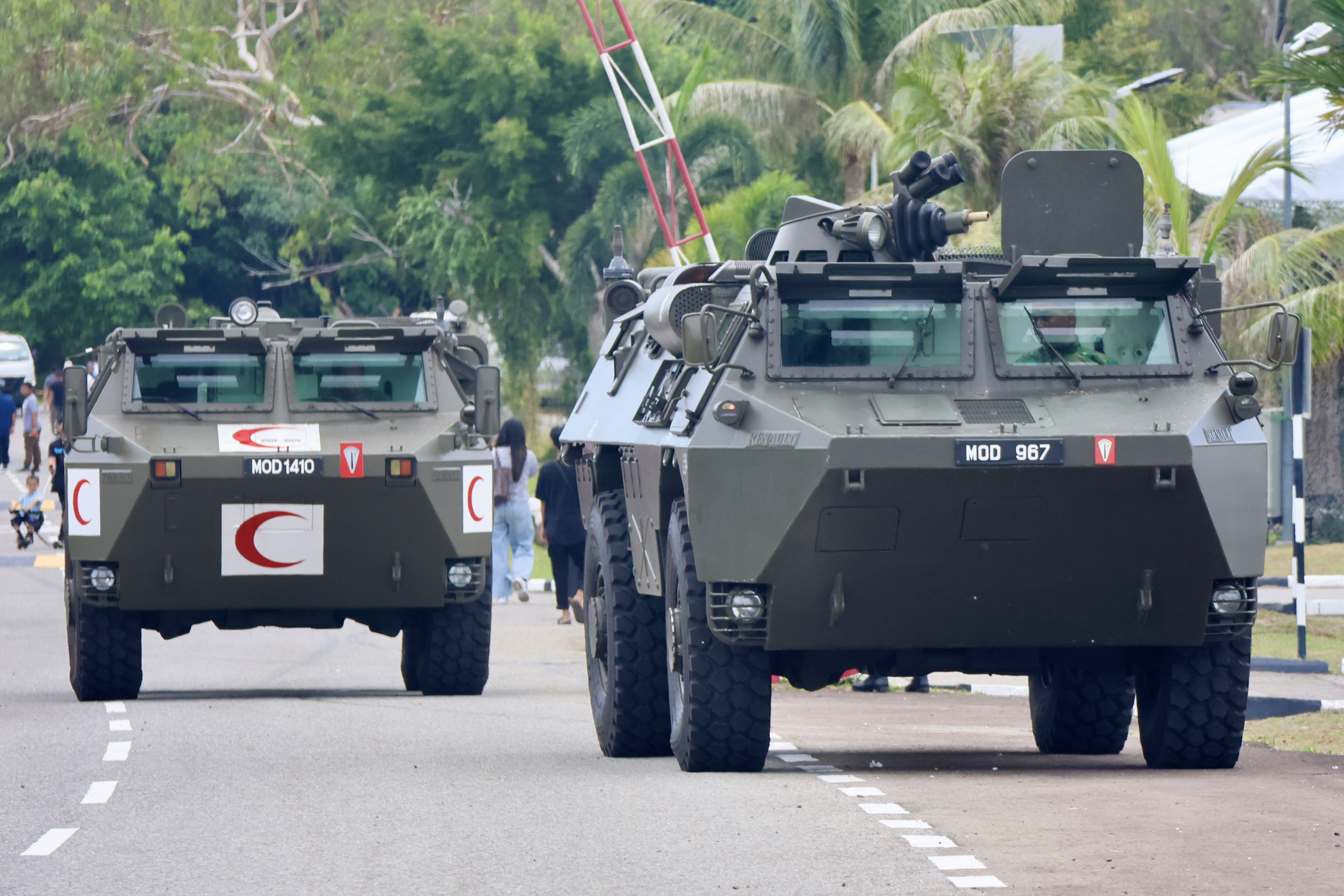
Two Véhicule de l'Avant Blindé seen at Penanjong Garrison in 2024.

The Royal Brunei Armed Forces (RBAF) use a wide range of foreign-procured equipment across all three service branches; with a large percentage originating from the United Kingdom, Europe (France, Germany, Switzerland, Spain), and the United States of America.

The Bruneian military in its post-independence form lacks any combat experience. However, it has been deployed regionally in humanitarian and peacekeeping missions; notably, since 2004; the Royal Brunei Armed Forces have formed part of the United Nations (UN) peacekeeping mission in Mindanao, the Philippines. Brunei continues to maintain extensive military relations with the United Kingdom, with British Forces Brunei (British Army and Royal Air Force) permanently based in the sultanate since its independence by invitation. Furthermore, the Sultan of Brunei Darussalam, Hassanal Bolkiah, is an honorary air chief marshal of the Royal Air Force, and an honorary admiral of the Royal Navy, and also an honorary admiral of the Republic of Singapore Navy.

On 6 May 2023, as part of the Commonwealth of Nations, ten members of the Royal Brunei Armed Forces took part in the 6,000-strong royal parade in London, England, to celebrate the formal Coronation of King Charles III.

31 May is the Armed Forces Day of Brunei Darussalam, which celebrates the founding of the Royal Brunei Armed Forces. It is an annual national holiday, and the events on the day include military parade in front of the Sultan, and public exhibition of its equipment and armament. On 31 May 2021; 5 years ago, Royal Brunei Armed Forces celebrated its diamond jubilee.

== See also ==
- Military forces based in Brunei
- Royal Brunei Armed Forces Sports Council
- Gurkha Security Unit
- National Service Programme
