= Musa Yakub =

Bruneian military officer

Yang Dimuliakan Pehin Datu Maharajalela Lieutenant Colonel (Retired) Dato Seri Laila Jasa Musa Yakub DSLJ DPMB PANB SNB
- موسى يعقوب
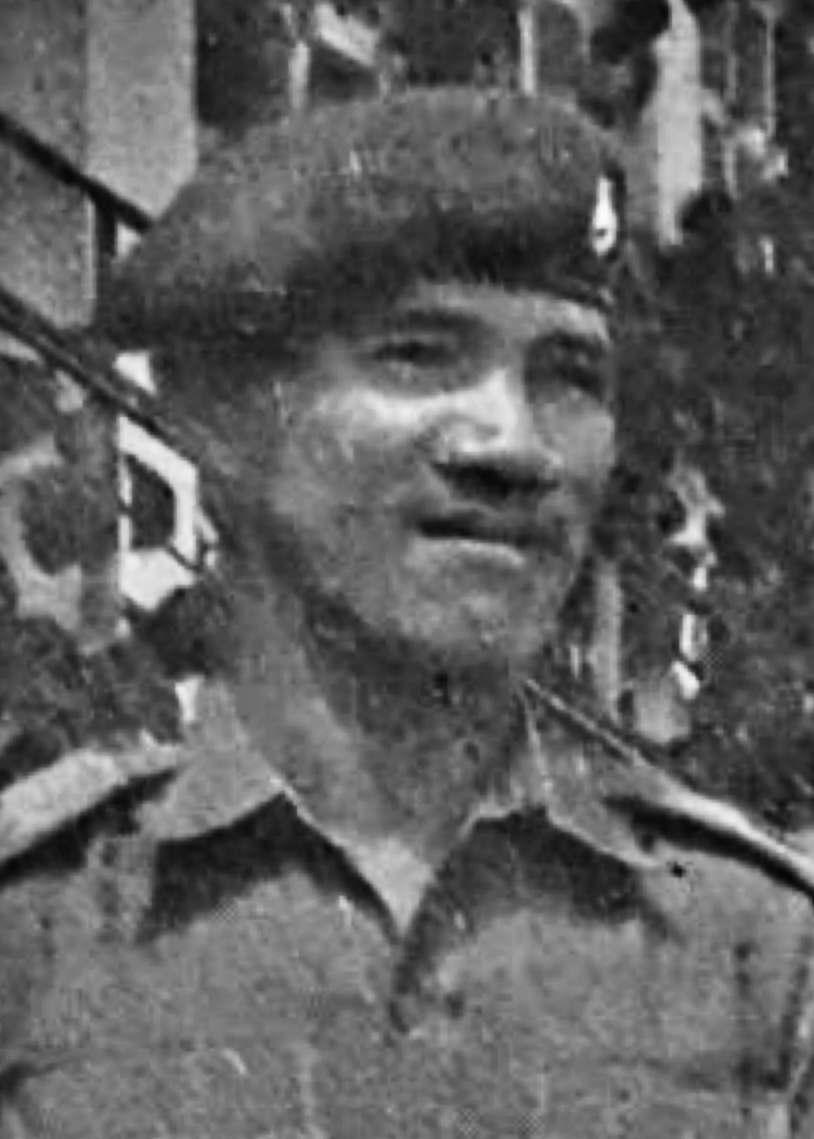
- Junior lieutenant Musa in 1967
- Born: Musa bin Yakub
- Alma mater: Royal Military College; Warminster Military School
- Military career
- Allegiance: Brunei
- Branch: Royal Brunei Land Force
- Service years: 1967–1971
- Rank: Lieutenant Colonel
- Commands: Training Institute RBAF
- Conflicts: Indonesia–Malaysia confrontation

Musa bin Haji Yakub, also referred to as Pehin Dato Musa, is a Bruneian aristocrat and retired military officer, who served as the commander of the Training Institute Royal Brunei Armed Forces (TI RBAF) from 1982 to 1984, and one of the few soldiers to take part in the 1960s Indonesia–Malaysia confrontation.

== Military career ==
At the "Boys Wing" Federation of Malaya Military College at Sungai Besi, Federation of Malaya, two Bruneians participated in a training program for the armed forces. They were given the rank of second lieutenant after finishing the training successfully. Junior Lieutenants Musa and another are the individuals in question. Members of the Royal Brunei Malay Regiment (RBMR) participated in a historic incident on 8 October 1966, when they searched and subsequent capture of the four TKNU remnants in Bukit Belalong, which is located in Temburong District's southern region. Junior Lieutenants Musa and Hussein bin Mohammad were given instructions to carry out the duty with their respective platoons.

The local troops from the regiment's number 6 and 9 platoons really participated in small-scale field operations in Bukit Belalong. The four TNKU members had snuck into the area from the Sarawak. After the search and cordon procedures, the four uniformed and rather malnourished members of the TNKU turned themselves in to the party that was approaching. TNKU badges, eighty-four rounds of various ammunition, and six automatic rifles were also discovered inside the shack where they were hiding.

In the subsequent year, the Sultan Omar Ali Saifuddien III bestowed the Order of Perwira Agong Negara Brunei First Class (PANB) to Second Lieutenant Musa during the investiture ceremony held on 18 April 1967 in Istana Darul Hana. Using their military expertise, he and Second Lieutenant Hussein successfully apprehended four insurgents in the woods near Sungai Mani, Batang Duri. Their service and achievements during the rebel search were recognised with the award of the order.

In 1967, Junior Lieutenant Musa and two others attended a Commonwealth firearms course in Warminster Military School, England for three weeks. When the first army cadet program was implemented in secondary schools in June 1970, Bruneian schools were transformed into a breeding ground for potential recruits. The students in the armed forces were to be trained by the commanders and NCOs. The initial officer to lead the school cadets was Captain Musa. Once again in 1972, Major Musa would undergo a Military Recruiting Course at the British Military Recruiting School in the United Kingdom for a year. From January 1982 to April 1982, he was appointed as commander of Training Institute RBAF.

== Personal life ==
Musa has a daughter named Siti Fatimahwati.

== Honours ==
Musa was awarded the Manteri title of Pehin Datu Maharajalela on 12 September 1974. Honours awarded to him are;

- Order of Paduka Seri Laila Jasa Second Class (DSLJ) – Dato Seri Laila Jasa
- Order of Seri Paduka Mahkota Brunei Second Class (DPMB) – Dato Paduka
- Order of Perwira Agong Negara Brunei First Class (PANB; 1966)
- Order of Setia Negara Brunei Third Class (SNB)
- Sultan Hassanal Bolkiah Medal First Class (PHBS; 12 February 1969)

Military offices
Preceded by Abdul Aziz Abdullah	4th Commander of the Training Institute; April 1982 – April 1984	Succeeded by Husin Sulaiman
