= Order of Perwira Agong Negara Brunei =

Awarded by the Sultan of Brunei
- Type: Military decoration
- Established: 1959
- Country: Brunei
- Status: Currently constituted
- Sovereign: Hassanal Bolkiah
- Grades: Officer (PANB); Member (PaNB)

Precedence
- Next (higher): Order of Seri Paduka Mahkota Brunei
- Next (lower): Varia medals of honour
- (PANB) (PNB)

The Most Faithful Order of Perwira Agong Negara Brunei (Malay: Darjah Perwira Agong Negara Brunei Yang Amat Setia), also translated as The Most Faithful Order of Gallantry of Brunei, is an order of Brunei. It was established on 28 November 1959 by Sultan Omar Ali Saifuddien III.

== Current classes ==
The two classes of appointment to the Order are, from highest grade to lowest :

Class	Post-nominal	Ribbon
Officer	PANB	
Member	PNB	

== Recipients ==
=== First Class ===
- Unknown – Hassanal Bolkiah – Sultan of Brunei
- Unknown – Omar Ali Saifuddien III – Sultan of Brunei
- Unknown – C.E.B. Parrott – Controller of Telecommunications
- Unknown – Colonel Jocklin – Commanding Officer of Air Wing ABDB
- 1963 – William lan Glass – Controller of Civil Aviation and Establishment Officer
- 1963 – Pengiran Mohammed Abdul Rahman Piut – Wazir
- 1963 – Mohamed Hassan Maun – Service during the Brunei Revolt
- 1963 – Besar Kula – Service during the Brunei Revolt
- 1966 – Lieutenant Colonel Musa – Commander of the Training Institute RBAF
- 1967 – Major J.R.E. Laird – Capturing North Kalimantan National Army rebels
- 1967 – Major Herbert Marshall – Capturing North Kalimantan National Army rebels

=== Second Class ===
- 1963 – Awang Dollah – Service during the Brunei Revolt
- 1963 – Sable Judah – Service during the Brunei Revolt
- 1963 – Abdul Hamid Ahmad – Service during the Brunei Revolt
- 1963 – Abdul Ghani Abdullah – Service during the Brunei Revolt
- 1963 – Ismail Kalong – Service during the Brunei Revolt
- 1966 – Major General Husin – Commander of the Royal Brunei Armed Forces
