= Military ranks of Brunei =

The military ranks of Brunei are depicted by the military insignia used by the Royal Brunei Armed Forces. Given its history of being established with help from the British Army, its rank insignia follow the former British influence with adaptations for Bruneian conditions, the RBAF having started as an infantry regiment, with naval and air assets.

== Commissioned officer ranks ==
The rank insignia of commissioned officers.

Rank group	General / flag officers					Senior officers			Junior officers
Royal Brunei Land Force
Royal Brunei Land Force	Fil marsyal	Jeneral	Leftenan jeneral	Mejar jeneral	Brigedier jeneral	Kolonel	Leftenan kolonel	Mejar	Kapten	Leftenan	Leftenan muda
Royal Brunei Navy
Royal Brunei Navy	Laksamana armada	Laksamana	Laksamana madya	Laksamana muda	Laksamana pertama	Kepten	Komander	Leftenan komander	Leftenan	Leftenan madya	Leftenan muda
Royal Brunei Air Force
Royal Brunei Air Force	Marsyal udara	Jeneral (udara)	Leftenan jeneral (udara)	Mejar jeneral (udara)	Brigedier jeneral (udara)	Kolonel (udara)	Leftenan kolonel (udara)	Mejar (udara)	Kapten (udara)	Leftenan (udara)	Leftenan muda (udara)
Rank group	General / flag officers					Senior officers			Junior officers

=== Student officer ranks ===
Rank group	Student officer
Royal Brunei Land Force
Royal Brunei Land Force	Pegawai kadet
Royal Brunei Navy
Royal Brunei Navy	Pegawai kadet
Royal Brunei Air Force
Royal Brunei Air Force	Pegawai kadet

== Other ranks ==
The rank insignia of non-commissioned officers and enlisted personnel.

Rank group	Senior NCOs				Junior NCOs		Enlisted
Royal Brunei Land Force							No insignia
Royal Brunei Land Force	Pegawai waran 1	Pegawai waran 2	Staf sarjan	Sarjan	Koperal	Lans koperal	Prebet/Soldadu
Royal Brunei Navy							No insignia
Royal Brunei Navy	Pegawai waran 1	Pegawai waran 2	Bintara kanan	Bintara	Laskar kanan	Laskar muda	Prebet/Soldadu
Royal Brunei Air Force							No insignia
Royal Brunei Air Force	Pegawai waran 1 (udara)	Pegawai waran 2 (udara)	Staf sarjan (udara)	Sarjan (udara)	Koperal (udara)	Lans koperal (udara)	Prebet/Soldadu (udara)
Rank group	Senior NCOs				Junior NCOs		Enlisted

=== Additional ranks and appointments ===
Rank group	Senior appointments
Royal Brunei Land Force
Royal Brunei Land Force	Sarjan mejar (Jawatan)	Pegawai kadet
Royal Brunei Navy
Royal Brunei Navy	Sarjan mejar (Jawatan)
Royal Brunei Air Force
Royal Brunei Air Force	Sarjan mejar (Jawatan)
