= Norsuriati Sharbini =

Bruneian military officer (born 1973)

Colonel (Retired) Norsuriati Sharbini PJK
- نورسورياتي شربيني
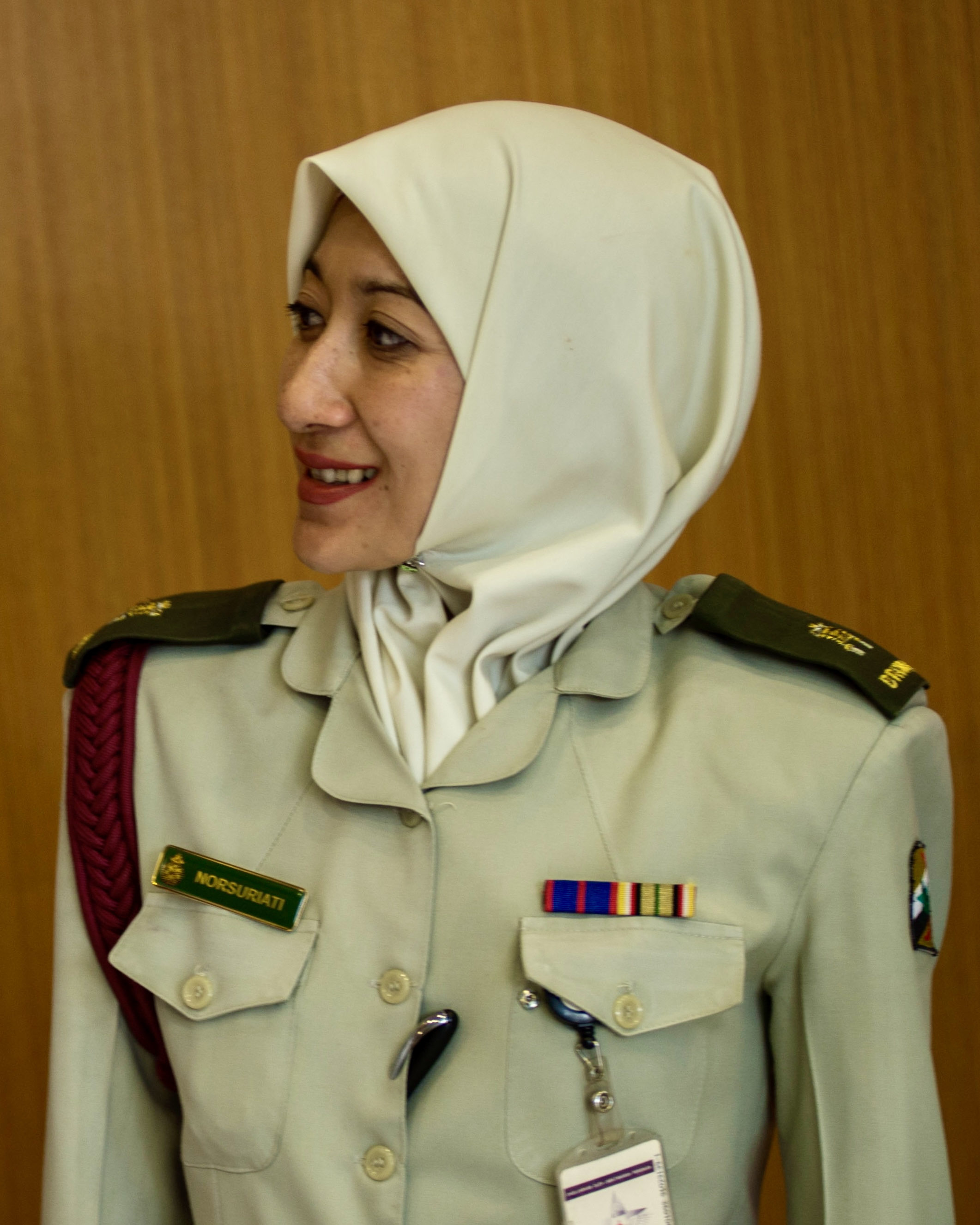
- Major Norsuriati in 2013
- Born: Norsuriati binti Haji Sharbini; August 1973 (age 53); Brunei
- Alma mater: Royal Military Academy Sandhurst; Defence Academy RBAF
- Spouse: Amirul Adly Ali
- Military career
- Allegiance: Brunei
- Branch: Royal Brunei Air Force
- Service years: 2001–2022
- Rank: Colonel
- Service number: 643
- Units: Women's Company; Judge Advocate General's Office
- Known for: First woman in the RBAF to be promoted to colonel

Norsuriati binti Haji Sharbini (born August 1973) is a Bruneian civil servant and former judge-advocate who became the first female to be promoted to the rank of colonel in the Royal Brunei Armed Forces (RBAF). She has also been a constant advocate of putting women into positions of professional leadership throughout her career. Her experience include mediation, policy making, teaching and research, disarmament, demobilisation, and reintegration of fighters, capacity building, program monitoring and evaluation, networking, and interfacing.

== Military career ==
Norsuriati joined the Royal Brunei Air Force (RBAirF) in 2001. She earned the Best Student award throughout her military training as an officer cadet at the Royal Military Academy Sandhurst. She went abroad to study law. At the Command and Staff College, she was among the twenty-eight students who completed the second series of the Command and Staff Course (CSC) were given certificates of course completion on 12 October 2012. In addition, she was given the "Outstanding contribution of the RBAF CSC Commendation Award."

Norsuriati oversaw the overhaul of the air force's military justice system as well as the execution of important changes to the force's rules and regulations. In order to improve troops' compliance with both common and military law and their sense of discipline, she has also arranged for legal training. She became the Head of Judge Advocate General's (JAG) Office at the Commander of the RBAF Secretariat Office and was the Ministry of Defence's (MINDEF) and the RBAirF's primary legal advisor.

On 29 November 2013, the RBAF stated that Norsuriati was one of the eight senior officers who had given their assent to be elevated to the rank of acting lieutenant colonel, with the Sultan of Brunei's approval. On 19 November 2018, the Australian Government presented her with the OBOE Endeavour Academic Excellence Award in honour of her exceptional performance in the just finished 12th RBAF Command and Staff Course (CSC) at the Defence Academy RBAF (DA RBAF). Following a ceremony on 20 May 2021, newly promoted officers received their rank insignias from Sultan Hassanal Bolkiah, making Norsuriati the first female military officer to attain the rank of colonel.

== Later career ==
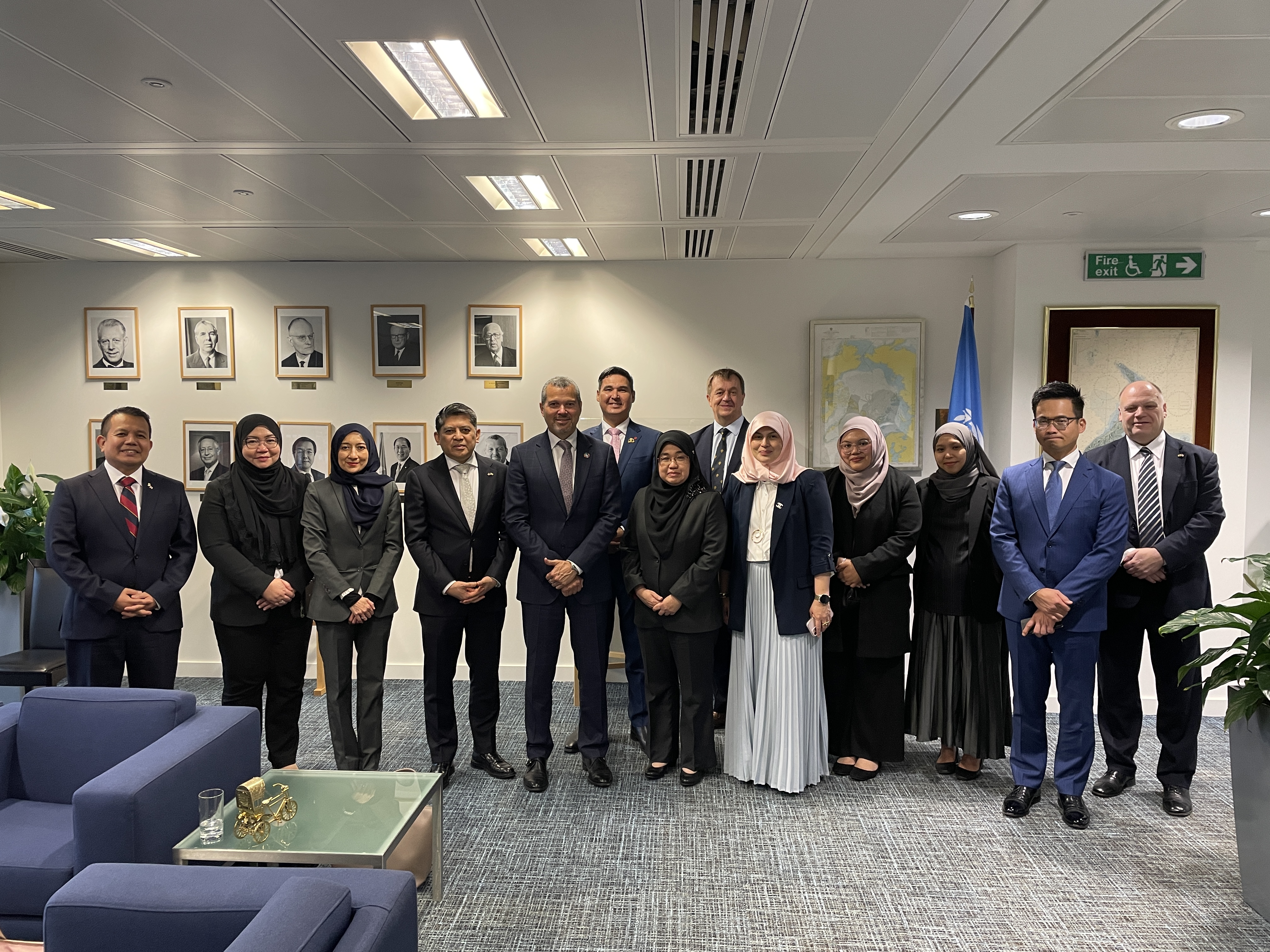
Norsuriati (third from left) and Arsenio Dominguez in 2024

On 1 August 2022, Sultan Hassanal Bolkiah gave his approval for her, the head of JAG Office, to be reappointed to the post of permanent secretary (Policy, Finance, and Administration) in the MINDEF. She has since served as her nation's representative at several international gatherings and events. On 10 November 2022, PT Pindad hosted a visit from the MINDEF delegation, which was led by her, at the Auditorium of PT Pindad Bandung. A group from Brunei was headed by her on an initial visit to Singapore from 4–7 December 2022. On 9 December 2022, MINDEF placed an order with Airbus for new C295MW transport aircraft. Permanent Secretary Norsuriati signed the agreement in front of the deputy defence minister and RBAF commander.

Retired Colonel Norsuriati handed up a $12,914 gift to the Ministry of Culture, Youth, and Sports (MCYS) for the Pakistan Flood Humanitarian Fund 2022 on 4 January 2023. She and Jonathan Knight co-chaired the 16th Joint Defence Committee (JDC) meeting between MINDEF and the Ministry of Defence on 25 January 2023. Held in Shinjuku on 5 December 2023, she attended the 4th Women, Peace and Security (WPS) Seminar and the 18th ADMM–Plus Experts' Working Group on Peacekeeping Operations.

== Advocacy ==
Norsuriati urges ASEAN to do more to support women in peacekeeping, having deployed women on UN peacekeeping operations. In addition, she represents her nation on the ASEAN Women for Peace Registry, where she advocates for gender equality, especially in the defence and security industries. The MINDEF was represented by Lieutenant Colonel Norsuriati in the inaugural discussion held on 7 March 2021, in honour of International Women's Day.

== Personal life ==
Norsuriati has a son and a daughter with Lieutenant Colonel Amirul Adly.

== Honours ==
Norsuriati has earned the following honours;

=== National ===
- Meritorious Service Medal (PJK; 7 May 2016)
- Sultan of Brunei Golden Jubilee Medal (5 October 2017)
- General Service Medal (Armed Forces)
- Royal Brunei Armed Forces Golden Jubilee Medal (31 May 2011)

=== Foreign ===
- United Kingdom:
  - Recipient of the Sandhurst Medal
