= Gurkha Reserve Unit =

Nepalese military unit in Brunei

Coordinates: 4.9390340°N 114.9743814°E

Gurkha Security Unit
- Pasukan Sekuriti Gurkha ڤاسوكن سيکوريتي ڬورخا
- Logo of Gurkha Reserve Unit
- Founded: 25 February 1974; 52 years ago
- Country: Brunei
- Allegiance: House of Bolkiah
- Branch: Royal Brunei Armed Forces
- Type: Special forces
- Role: Royal guard
- Size: Regiment
- Headquarters: Sungai Akar Camp, Sungai Akar, Bandar Seri Begawan BC4115
- Anniversaries: 25 February

Commanders
- Commandant: Lieutenant Colonel (U) Hj Habil bin Hj Adol
- Deputy Commandant: Major Shree Prasad Bura
- Regimental Sergeant Major: Warrant Officer 1 Purna Bahadur Pun

The Gurkha Security Unit (GSU; Malay: Pasukan Sekuriti Gurkha, Jawi: ڤاسوكن سيکوريتي ڬورخا), formerly known as Gurkha Reserve Unit (GRU; Malay: Pasukan Simpanan Gurkha, PSG; also referred to as the Royal Brunei Gurkha Reserve Unit), is a Bruneian special elite guard force and royal guard consisting of Gurkhas from Nepal.

== Background ==
The GRU are an elite force of soldiers from Nepal who are commissioned by the sultan of Brunei to protect the royal family, the citizens, and major oil installations. About 500 Gurkhas work for the Brunei Reserve Unit, the bulk of them are former members of the British Army and Gurkha Contingent ex-Nepal and Indian armies who joined the GRU as a second career. The group of ex-Gurkha, collectively referred to as "the Praetorian Guard," was previously led by retired British commanders. Military analysts assert that while being well-paid and housed, these Gurkha regiments are not as effective as those that are part of the British Army.

== Structure ==
=== Administration ===
It is subordinate to the Security and Defence Section of the Ministry of Home Affairs. The commandant of the unit, who will be chosen by the Sultan, will be responsible for the organization and management of the unit under the direction and authority of the Minister. In the event of the Commandant's absence or incompetence, the next highest officer present may exercise and carry out the powers and responsibilities set forth in this Act on behalf of the Commandant. The GRU shall be a fundamental component of the Security Forces of Brunei and shall be composed of such a composition of senior officers, subordinate officers, and rank and file as the Sultan may command.

=== Recruitment ===
Every member of the Unit must be hired in line with the service contract terms that were in effect when they were hired. After turning 40, no member of the GRU may be given another term of duty with the unit without the Minister's consent and on the Commandant's suggestion. The Unit's responsibilities include taking legal measures to carry out any obligations placed on it by the Sultan or by any written legislation. Each member of the Unit, while serving in that capacity, shall have all the rights, protections, and powers of a police officer and shall be regarded as an employee of the government within the meaning of the Penal Code.

=== Compensation ===
When a member of the unit sustains an injury while doing his duties without being negligent, the Sultan may decide to compensate the victim according to the commandant's recommendations and the results of a medical board or a government medical officer. When a member of the unit dies within a year of suffering such injuries but whose dependents are not entitled to any payment or benefit under section 12 of the Gurkha Reserve Unit Act (Cap. 135), the Sultan may grant compensation in an amount not more than the member's yearly remuneration.

== History ==
=== Establishment ===
In 1947, the Britain–India–Nepal Tripartite Agreement was signed between India, United Kingdom and Nepal, except that this agreement does not apply to Gurkhas employed in the Nepalese Army. Under the agreement, four Gurkha regiments of the British Indian Army were transferred to the British Army and six joined the Indian Army. As of 2020, India has 39 Gurkha battalions serving in seven Gurkha regiments. Those transferred to the British Army were posted to other remaining British colonies. In Malaya and Singapore, their presence was required in the Malayan Emergency, and they were to replace the Sikh unit in Singapore which reverted to the Indian Army on Indian independence.

In 1973, prisoners of the 1962 Brunei revolt escaped with the claimed help of a foreign warden. the Sultanate of Brunei decided to hire ex-Gurkhas from Hong Kong and Singapore as security after Singapore was consulted. On 25 February 1974, Mohansing Gurung (ex-Singapore Police, presently settled in Kathmandu) became the first Gurkha to serve in Brunei. The unit was known as the Gurkha Security Guard. It was formed in 1974 and maintains approximately 2,000 Gurkhas.

The government turned to alternative options to bolster the armed forces' strength in order to make up for the lack of regular troop recruiting. In order to fill the specialised Gurkha Reserve Unit, which was created out of former Royal Gurkha Rifles troops, an extensive recruiting campaign was launched in 1976. Compared to the Gurkhas of the British Army, this regiment was distinct. They stayed on to guard the Sultanate's internal security concerns. They rotated from their Brigade Headquarters in Hong Kong to Seria. Prior to Brunei's independence in 1984, a confidential correspondence with Whitehall provided for their deployment. The Gurkha Battalion remained in the Sultanate at the cost of the Brunei government due to a confidential deal that was negotiated between Brunei and Britain.

In contrast, the Gurkha Reserve Unit was directly commanded by the Sultan. Certain claim that this event was directly linked to the threat that certain political captives from Brunei felt was presented by their escape from the Berakas Prison, which occurred with the claimed help of a foreign warden. Static guard tasks were carried out by the GRU in 1973, mostly in the capital area. It was intended to relieve some of the strain on the already overworked Royal Brunei Police (RBP) and Royal Brunei Malay Regiment (RBMR). The Gurkha Reserve Unit was fully established in 1980.

Richard Luce, the Minister of State at the Foreign and Commonwealth Office (FCO), reportedly believed "it a good idea to help the new state to defend the rich oilfields," according to a 23 September 1983 Financial Times story. Furthermore, "aware that the Gurkha presence provides good experience for nearly 200 British military officers and NCOs, appeared content for them to stay," according to the British Ministry of Defence.

=== 1996 rebellion ===
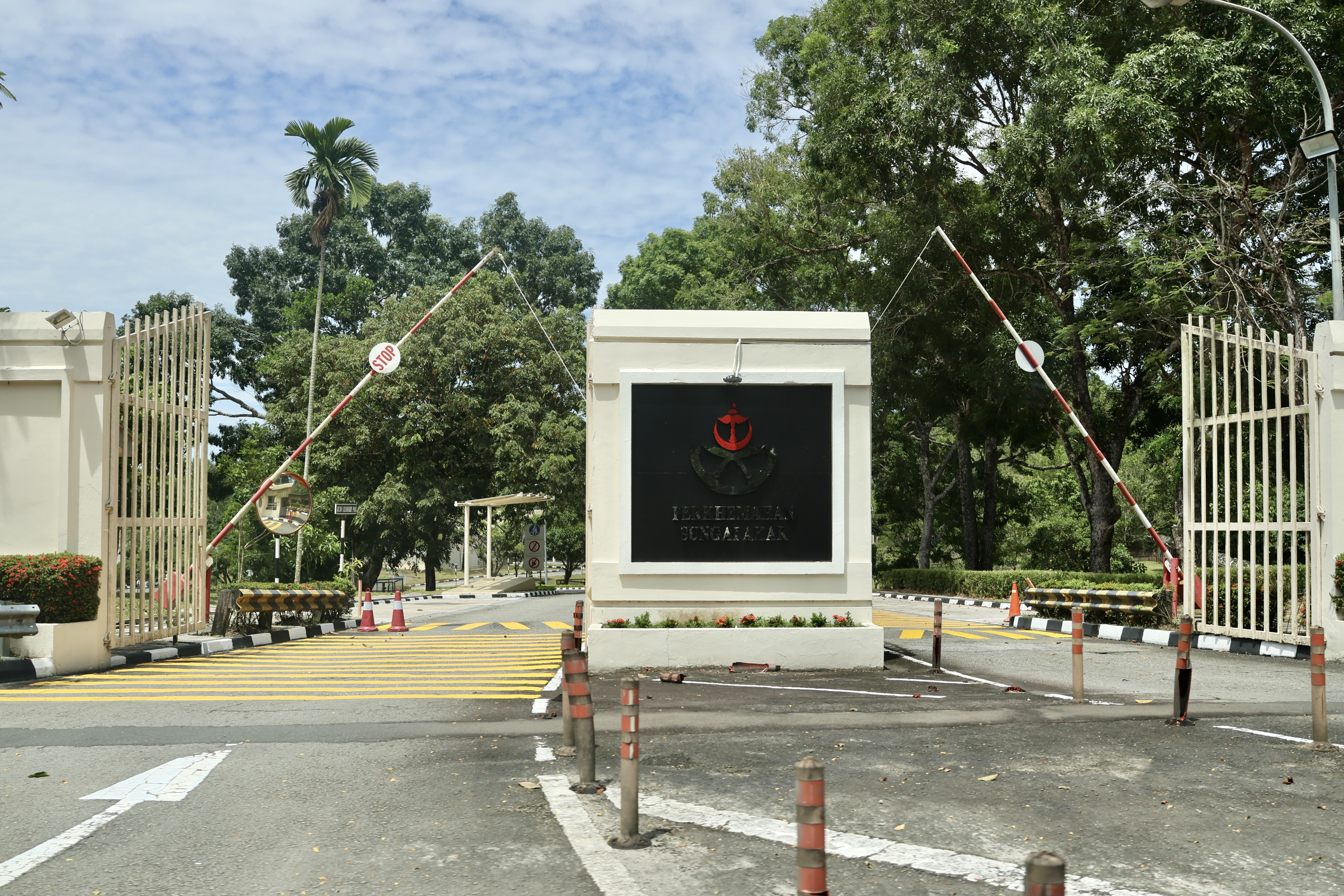
Sungai Akar Camp in 2023

In the Sungai Akar Camp in September 1996, a few of the Gurkha troops were fed up with the way their British and Brunei superiors were treating them, met to determine the best method to protest and to bring awareness to this issue. Their complaints included being ridiculed and harassed, as well as not receiving the right salary, benefits, and free meals. In addition, they believed that Gurkha recruitment for the Brunei security forces should be handled by a separate treaty between Nepal and Brunei rather than by the British Army.

Out of the 2,500 Gurkha soldiers in Brunei, more than 2,400 joined on to support the cause after our meeting created a governing committee and subcommittees. While they were in discussions with the leadership, boycotting had begun on some of the top officials. One of their requests was the abolishment of the GRU. Their written memorandum was presented, but it was rejected. Then, all GRU weapons were abruptly returned to the government of Brunei one night, and their unit resumed its role as a security guard force. Other requests, such as a pay raise and an end to the maltreatment by haughty officers.

Pressure was mounting as the issue once more came to a boil. It was clear that in order to enforce military discipline, the brass would take harsh action against whatever it deemed to be a mutiny and insubordination. As it turned out, 11 of them who were deemed to be the instigators were covertly deported, and without the rest of the unit knowing, and were sent to the Brunei International Airport to catch a flight back to Nepal. At the airport, they were waiting to board and were unaware that word had already spread about our dismissal and expulsion from the camp. The Nepali troops protested by encircling the headquarters building and demanding their dismissal, in response to the deteriorating situation and vandalism, HQ dispatched the riot police.

A few hours later, the Permanent Secretary of Brunei, hurried to the airport to ask what had transpired. He questioned and wanted to know whether they could persuade the Nepalis still camped there to return to their dorms and terminate the protest. Ram Kangdangwa retorted that he would if their employment was reinstated and was given permission to address the base population for a brief speech. Following his speech, the Nepali troops all dispersed. The Permanent Secretary apparently was taken aback by the Gurkhas' obedience and discipline, so he proceeded to speak with GRU commanders. He stated that Col. F. D. Scotson, the British commander in head of the GRU, had recently been sacked. The Permanent Secretary promised us that all of our other requests, including those for a pay and pension, would be satisfied now that Scotson had left office and the GRU had returned to its previous position as a security force.

=== Present day ===
On 25 February 1999, the GRU celebrated their 25th Silver Jubilee.

On 2 May 2001 at the Sungai Akar Camp, the unit staged its first "Long Service and Good Conduct Medal" award ceremony. In all, 237 personnel—11 officers and 226 soldiers of various ranks—were awarded medals by the deputy minister of defence, Pengiran Ibnu Ba'asith upon completion of nine years of meritorious service. According to him, the unit's main responsibility is to keep "designated government buildings, installations, and key points" secure around-the-clock. Additionally, they aid the Royal Brunei Police Force (RBPF) and other governmental organizations in their monitoring and search operations.

Brunei has raised almost $166,000 for the victims of the Nepal earthquake, and on 22 June 2015 transfer ceremony saw the Gurkha Reserve Unit donate $2,667. Since it began on 30 April, the Humanitarian Fund for Nepal's Earthquake Victims has amassed $166,585.53. The contributions were presented to Noridah Abdul Hamid, acting director of the Community Development Department at the Ministry of Culture, Youth and Sports, by LTC Rani Bujang, commandant of the GRU.

The GRU's K9 Section hired Dog Force Australia in the middle of 2019 to offer a Train the Trainer Course to six of their seasoned handlers. The course's main goal was to provide the students with the knowledge and abilities necessary for the unit to train handlers in explosive detection, searching and patrol duties. Numerous new training approaches were incorporated into the unit's current training program as a result of the training program's exceptionally positive reception.

== Units ==
- Guard Unit (GD UNIT)
- Support Unit (SP UNIT)
- K-9 Unit (K-9 UNIT)

== See also ==
- Royal Brunei Armed Forces
- Gurkhas of the British Indian Army (1858–1947)
- Gorkha regiments (India), seven regiments in India which is the original parent force for the units in Singapore and Brunei
- Gurkha Contingent (Singapore)
- Brigade of Gurkhas (British Army)
- Royal Gurkha Rifles (British Army)
