= Royal Gurkha Rifles =

Infantry regiment of the British Army

The Royal Gurkha Rifles
- Cap badge
- Active: 1 July 1994 – present
- Country: United Kingdom
- Allegiance: King Charles III
- Branch: British Army
- Type: Rifles
- Role: 1st Battalion – Light Infantry; 2nd Battalion – Light Infantry; Krithia Company – Specialist Infantry; Coriano Company – Specialist Infantry; Falklands Company —Specialist Infantry; Sittang Company, Mandalay Company, Tavoleto Company—OPFOR
- Size: Two battalions Five companies
- Part of: Brigade of Gurkhas; Light Division
- Garrison/HQ: RHQ – Camberley; 1st Battalion – Shorncliffe; 2nd Battalion – Seria, Brunei; Krithia Company - Belfast; Coriano Company – Aldershot Garrison; Falklands Company – Aldershot Garrison; Sittang Company – Royal Military Academy Sandhurst; Mandalay Company – Infantry Battle School; Tavoleto Company – Land Warfare Centre
- Nickname: The Gurkhas
- March: Quick – "Bravest of the Brave"; Double Past – "Keel Row"; Slow (band) – "God Bless the Prince of Wales"; Slow (pipes and drums) – "The Garb of Auld Gaul"
- Anniversaries: Meiktila (1 March); Medicina (16 April); Regimental Birthday (1 July); Gallipoli (7 August); Delhi Day (14 September)

Commanders
- Colonel-in-Chief: King Charles III
- Colonel of the Regiment: Brigadier David T. Pack

Insignia
- Tactical recognition flash

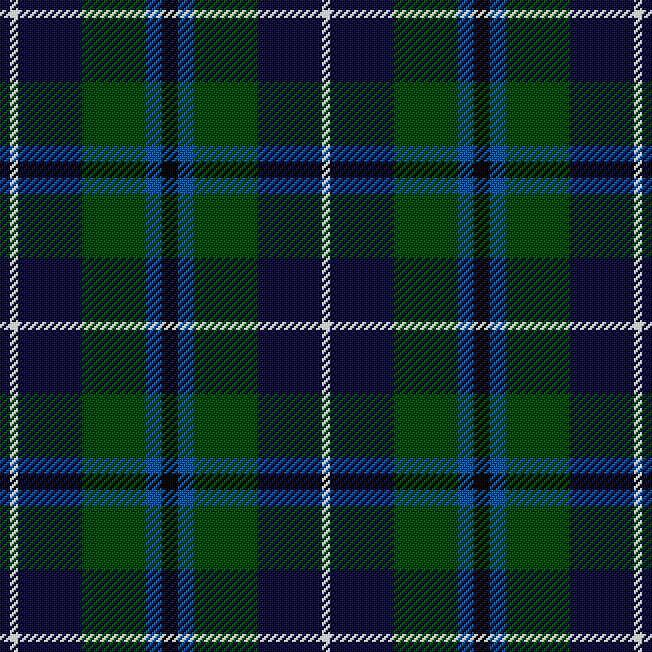
- Tartan: Douglas (pipers' trews and plaids), from 7th Duke of Edinburgh's Own Gurkha Rifles
- Abbreviation: RGR

The Royal Gurkha Rifles (RGR) is a rifle regiment of the British Army established in 1994, as an amalgamation of older Gurkha Rifle regiments. It forms part of the Brigade of Gurkhas. Unlike other regiments in the British Army, RGR soldiers are recruited from Nepal, which is neither a dependent territory of the United Kingdom nor a member of the Commonwealth.

== History ==
The regiment was formed as the sole Gurkha infantry regiment of the British Army following the consolidation of the four separate Gurkha regiments in 1994:

- 2nd King Edward VII's Own Gurkha Rifles (The Sirmoor Rifles)
- 6th Queen Elizabeth's Own Gurkha Rifles
- 7th Duke of Edinburgh's Own Gurkha Rifles
- 10th Princess Mary's Own Gurkha Rifles

The amalgamations took place as follows:

- 1st Battalion, Royal Gurkha Rifles; formed by the consolidation of the 1st Bn, 2nd King Edward VII's Own Gurkha Rifles and 1st Bn, 6th Queen Elizabeth's Own Gurkha Rifles.
- 2nd Battalion, Royal Gurkha Rifles; formed by renaming the 1st Bn, 7th Duke of Edinburgh's Own Gurkha Rifles.
- 3rd Battalion, Royal Gurkha Rifles; formed by renaming the 1st Bn, 10th Princess Mary's Own Gurkha Rifles.

The 3rd Battalion was consolidated with the 2nd Battalion in 1996 as part of run down of British forces in Hong Kong.

The Gurkhas in general and the direct predecessors of the Royal Gurkha Rifles in particular are considered to be among the finest infantrymen in the world, as is evidenced by the high regard they are held in for both their fighting skill, and their smartness of turnout on parade.

In December 1995, Lieutenant-Colonel Bijaykumar Rawat became the commanding officer of the 1st Battalion, the first Nepalese to become a battalion commander in the RGR. He oversaw the departure of the battalion from Hong Kong just before that city's transfer to Chinese control, and the battalion's relocation to Queen Elizabeth Barracks, Church Crookham in 1996.

Twice during its most recent Brunei posting the 2nd Battalion was deployed as the Afghanistan Roulement Infantry Battalion, while the 1st Battalion deployed as part of 52 Infantry Brigade in late 2007. During this tour, Cornet Harry Wales (Prince Harry) was attached for a period to the 1st Battalion as a Forward Air Controller.

Under Army 2020, the regiment was intended to provide two light role battalions, rotating between Brunei and the UK, with their higher unit as 11th Infantry Brigade. However, in June 2015, the 2nd Battalion, then based in the UK, was reassigned to form part of 16 Air Assault Brigade, in the air assault infantry role.

In 2018, the UK Government announced that it intended to recruit more than 800 new posts to the Brigade of Gurkhas. Approximately 300 of these are planned for the Royal Gurkha Rifles, which was to see the formation of a new battalion planned for the specialist infantry role. On 11 March 2019, the Minister for the Armed Forces confirmed that the 3rd Battalion Royal Gurkha Rifles would be reestablished, with recruitment starting in 2019. The battalion was reformed on 31 January 2020, to be based initially at Shorncliffe before moving to Aldershot. However, following the revised Future Soldier (British Army) reorganisation, the formation of the 3rd Battalion was cancelled, with instead a number of independent companies established. The first formed unit, Coriano Company, within 4th Battalion The Ranger Regiment. This was subsequently followed by Falklands Company, within 2nd Battalion, The Rangers. A third reinforcement company, Krithia Company, was formed in April 2024 as part of 1st Battalion, The Rangers.

== Organisation ==
At any one time, one battalion is based at the British garrison in Brunei as part of Britain's commitment to maintaining a military presence in Southeast Asia.

Meanwhile, the other battalion is based at Sir John Moore Barracks, Shorncliffe, near Folkestone in Kent as part of 16 Air Assault Brigade Combat Team, and is available for deployment to most areas in Europe and Africa.

1 RGR and 2 RGR rotate between Brunei and Folkestone, typically every 3 years.

Krithia Company, Coriano Company and Falklands Company operate as part of the Army Special Operations Brigade providing training, mentoring and operational support for indigenous forces in partner nations, and is based in Aldershot Garrison.

=== Training companies ===
In addition to the operational battalions, four further units are cap badged as Royal Gurkha Rifles:

- Gurkha Company (Sittang)
- Gurkha Wing (Mandalay)
- Gurkha Company (Tavoleto)
- Gurkha Company (Babaji)

These four are formed as operational training units at the Royal Military Academy Sandhurst, the Infantry Battle School, Land Warfare Centre, and Infantry Training Centre, to provide opposing forces for realistic battle simulation.

=== Gurkha clerks ===
Prior to 2011, administrative support for the entire Brigade of Gurkhas was provided by specially trained personnel called Gurkha clerks, who wore the cap badge of the Royal Gurkha Rifles. In June 2011, the Gurkha clerks were amalgamated into a single company sized unit called the Gurkha Staff and Personnel Support Company (GSPS), which was incorporated as part of the Adjutant General's Corps. As with the other Gurkha support units (Queen's Gurkha Engineers, Queen's Gurkha Signals, Queen's Own Gurkha Logistic Regiment), the GSPS received its own cap badge based on the badge of its parent corps.

== Ranks ==
Upon joining the British Army the RGR's predecessor regiments adopted British rank titles (e.g. sergeant and corporal) instead of the Indian Army names used before (e.g. havildar and naik). Similarly, the regiments' Viceroy Commissioned Officers, who were neither commissioned officers nor non-commissioned officers but filled most of the junior officer positions in a battalion, had their titles changed to (King's) Queen's Gurkha Officer (QGO), e.g. lieutenant (QGO), captain (QGO), major (QGO) instead of the Indian Army ranks of jemadar, subedar, and subedar-major. At the same time, some RGR Gurkha officers had a Queen's Commission; they often had a (GCO) suffix after their rank.

Subsequently, on 17 June 2008, the London Gazette published a Supplement that effectively abolished the QGO system by listing every serving QGO officer with their new commissioned rank (e.g. captain (QGO) became captain); the (QGO) and (GCO) suffixes disappeared. Thus, serving Gurkhas, who previously would have become QGO, are now given a British commission and described as "Late Entry." Direct entry officers can be either British or Nepali (occasionally); they follow the normal British Army training for all direct entry infantry officers. A significant addition to the normal direct entry training for British RGR officers is that they will carry out Nepali language training in Nepal, which culminates in a month-long hike through the Nepalese countryside both to practise their language skills and learn about the country from which their soldiers are recruited.

== Notable soldiers ==
Corporal Dip Prasad Pun of the 1st battalion (1 RGR) was awarded the Conspicuous Gallantry Cross for an act of bravery during the War in Afghanistan in 2010. He alone defended his outpost against a force of up to 12 Taliban fighters. He fired more than 400 rounds, 17 grenades, and one mine. He resorted to fighting with his machine gun tripod after his ammunition had run out.

== Battle honours ==
The battle honours of the Royal Gurkha Rifles are as follows:

- Amboor, Carnatic, Mysore 1792, Assaye 1803, Ava 1852, Burma 1885–87, Bhurtpore, Aliwal, Sobraon, Delhi 1857, Kabul 1879, Afghanistan 1878–80, Kandahar 1880, Tirah, Punjab Frontier, Afghanistan 1919
- First World War: La Bassée 1914, Festubert 1914–15, Givenchy 1914, Neuve Chapelle, Aubers, Loos, France and Flanders 1914–15, Egypt 1915, Tigris 1916, Kut al Amara 1917, Baghdad, Mesopotamia 1916–18, Persia 1918, Baluchistan 1918, Helles, Krithia, Suvla, Sari Bair, Gallipoli 1915, Suez Canal, Egypt 1915–16, Khan Baghdadi, Mesopotamia 1916–18, Persia 1916–1918, North West Frontier India 1915–17, Egypt 1915, Megiddo, Sharon, Palestine 1918, Shaiba, Kut al Amara 1915–17, Ctesiphon, Defence of Kut al Amara, Baghdad, Sharqat, Mesopotamia 1915–18
- The Second World War: Tobruk 1942, El Alamein, Akarit, Tunis, Cassino 1, Poggio Del Grillo, Gothic Line, Tavoleto, Coriano, Santacangelo, Monte Chicco, Bologna, Medicina, Italy 1944–45, Jitra, Slim River, Sittang 1942, 1945, Kyaukse 1942, 1945, North Arakan, Imphal, Tuitum, Bishenpur, Tengnoupal, Shwebo, Kyaukmyaung Bridgehead, Mandalay, Myinmu Bridgehead, Fort Dufferin, Meiktila, Irrawaddy, Rangoon Road, Chindits 1943,44 & 45, Tamandu, Maymyo
- Falklands War

== Lineage ==
Lineage
The Royal Gurkha Rifles	The 2nd King Edward VII's Own Gurkha Rifles (The Sirmoor Rifles)	The Sirmoor Battalion
The Royal Gurkha Rifles	The 6th Queen Elizabeth's Own Gurkha Rifles	The Cuttack Legion
The Royal Gurkha Rifles	The 7th Duke of Edinburgh's Own Gurkha Rifles	Assam Sebundy Corps
The Royal Gurkha Rifles	The 10th Princess Mary's Own Gurkha Rifles	14th Battalion of Coast Sepoys

== Alliances ==
- India: Para (Indian Special Forces)/Special Frontier Force
- Canada: The Queen's Own Rifles of Canada
- New Zealand: Royal New Zealand Infantry Regiment
- Malaysia: Royal Malay Regiment (Elite Parachute Division)
- Brunei: Gurkha Reserve Unit
- Singapore: Gurkha Contingent

== See also ==
- History and origin of Gurkha regiments
- Gorkha regiments (India), 39 Gorkha battalions serving in 7 Gorkha regiments
- Gurkha Contingent (Singapore), a line department of Singapore police
- Gurkha Reserve Unit (Brunei), special guard force
- Kukri
- Military Forces Based in Brunei
- Queen's Truncheon

Preceded by The Parachute Regiment	Infantry Order of Precedence	Succeeded by The Rifles
