= Languages of Brunei =

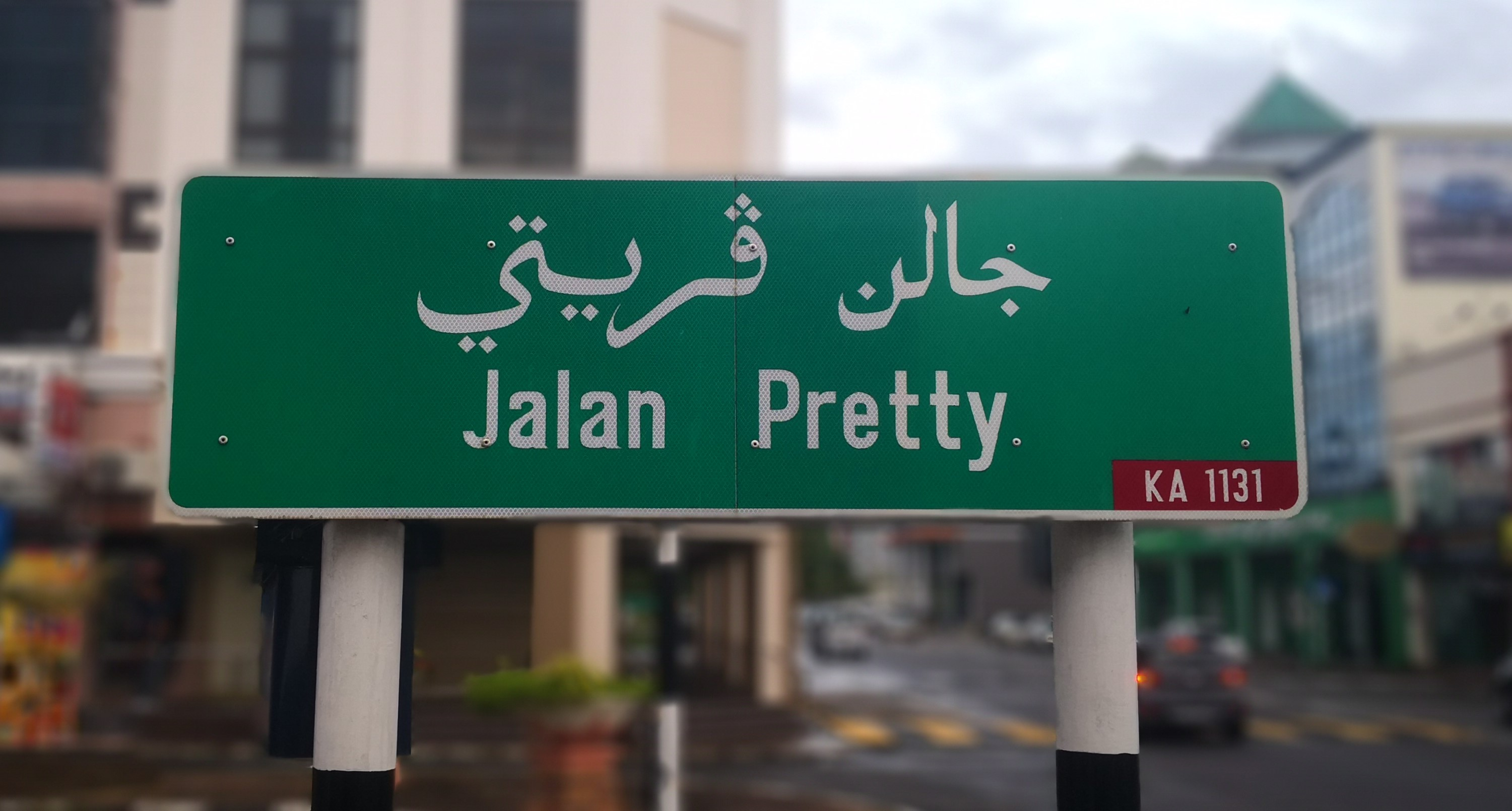
- Sign on Jalan Pretty ("Pretty Road") in Kuala Belait in Malay and in Jawi script
- Official: Malay
- Vernacular: Brunei Malay, Brunei English
- Minority: Tutong, Kedayan, Belait, Murut, Dusun (Brunei), Brunei Bisaya
- Foreign: English, Indonesian, Arabic, Chinese (Hokkien, Hakka, Mandarin and Cantonese)
- Signed: American Sign Language
- Keyboard layout: QWERTY

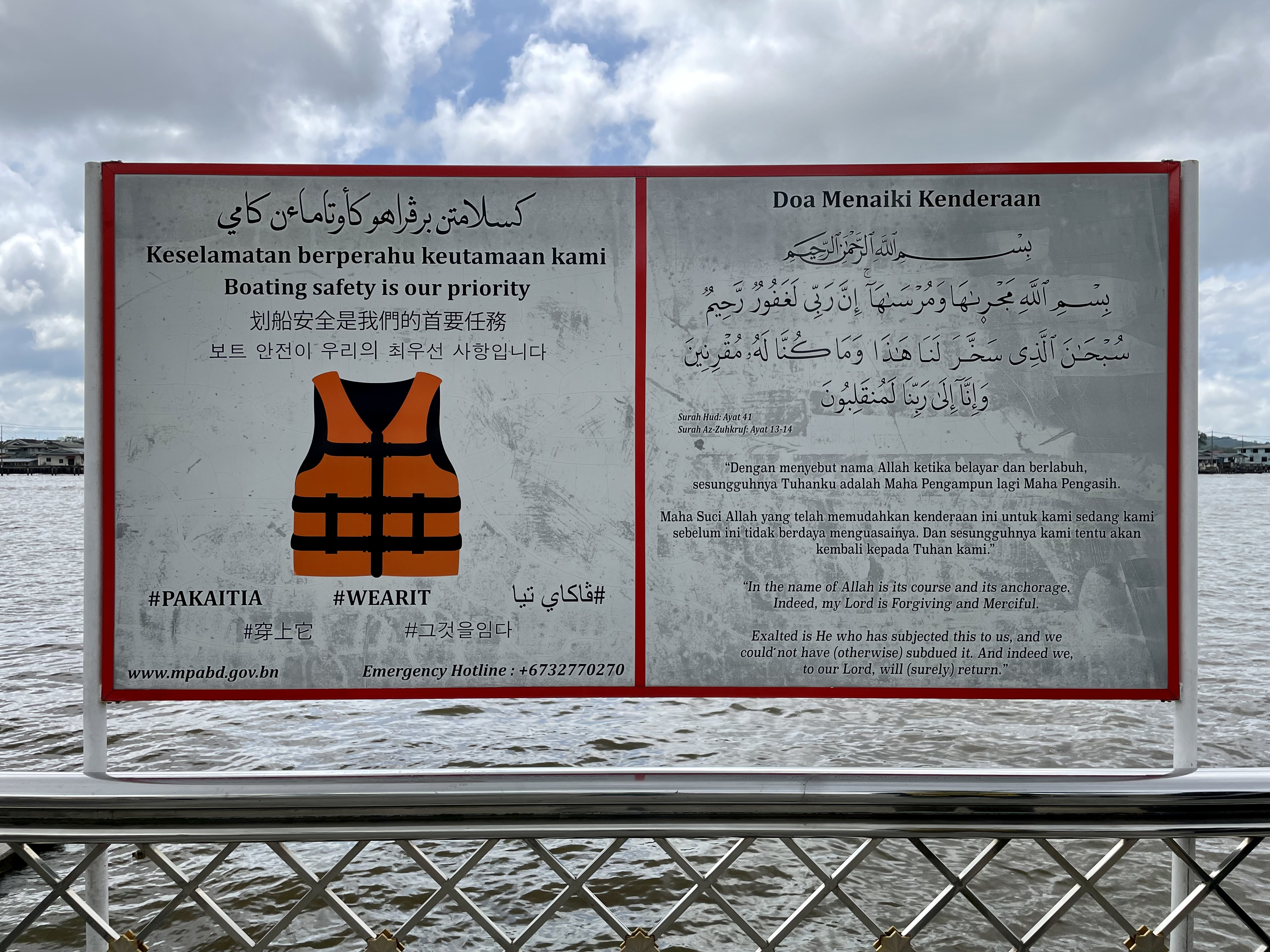
Sign in Bandar Seri Bagawan in Malay (Latin and Jawi script), English, Traditional Chinese, Korean and Arabic.

There are a number of languages spoken in Brunei. The official language of the state of Brunei is Standard Malay, the same Malaccan dialect that is the basis for the standards in Malaysia and Indonesia. This came into force on 29 September 1959, with the signing of Brunei 1959 Constitution.

== Standard Malay ==
Malay is specified as the national language of Brunei in the constitution of 1959, and its central role in the country is reinforced in the national philosophy of a "Islamic Malay Monarchy" (Melayu Islam Beraja).

While the variety of Malay that functions as the national language is not specified, it is generally assumed to be a variety of Standard Malay that is similar to the standard varieties promoted in Malaysia and Indonesia.

In fact, the use of Standard Malay and Brunei Malay can be described under the concept of diglossia, with Standard Malay taking the H(igh) role and being used in formal domains such as teaching and official speeches, while Brunei Malay functions in a L(ow) role, being used in informal domains such as between friends and in local shops.

In terms of pronunciation, Standard Bruneian Malay share more phonetic features with Indonesian than Malaysian such as rhoticity (i.e [r] at the end of words such as besar "big") and a lack of final schwa (i.e. [a] rather than [ə]) at the end of words such as saya ('I') and utara ('north'). Pronunciation can differ slightly from that of Peninsular Malaysia, influenced by local dialects. Standard Bruneian Malay is also unique compared to Malaysian and Indonesian for its tendency of cresting pitch in enunciating penultimate syllables unless a schwa is present.

== Brunei Malay ==
The local dialect, Brunei Malay, is the most widely spoken language. It is spoken by about 266,000 people. About 84% of its words are cognate with Standard Malay, while 94% are reported to be cognate with Kedayan.

Brunei Malay is also spoken as a lingua franca in some parts of East Malaysia such as the Federal Territory of Labuan, the districts of Limbang and Lawas (Sarawak) and the districts of Sipitang, Beaufort, Kuala Penyu and Papar (Sabah). In Brunei, use of Brunei Malay is expanding at the expense of the other indigenous minority languages in Brunei, most of which are under threat of extinction.

Some of the phonological features of Brunei Malay are: /h/ cannot occur in initial position, so Standard Malay habis (finish) is abis in Brunei Malay; and there are only three vowels, /i, a, u/. For its syntax, it has been claimed that the verb often occurs in initial position, and there is a distinct set of modal verbs.

The most salient difference between the pronunciation of Brunei Malay and Kedayan is that the latter has no /r/ sound, so rambut (hair) in Brunei Malay is ambut in Kedayan.

== English ==
English is widely used as a business, all official documents are reproduced in English, and it is spoken by a majority of the population in Brunei, though some people have only a rudimentary knowledge of the language. There is one daily English language newspaper, Borneo Bulletin.

The bilingual system of education was introduced in 1985, with the first three years taught in Malay while English was the medium of instruction for most subjects from the fourth year of primary school onward, so all school children have had substantial exposure to English since then. In 2008, the new SPN21 education system was introduced, and from then on, maths and science have been taught in English from the start of primary school, so the role of English is even more firmly established.

The language of the courts is mainly English, though, just as in Malaysia, code-switching between English and Malay is common. While formal English is based on British English, American English is having increasing influence, and Brunei English is becoming distinct in its own right.

One result of the promotion of both English and Malay in Brunei is that minority languages, such as Tutong and Dusun, tend to get squeezed out. Noor Azam has described the situation using the Malay proverb: Gajah berperang, pelanduk mati di tengah-tengah. ('When elephants fight, the mouse-deer between them dies.')

Some features of the pronunciation of English in Brunei are: the TH sound at the start of words such as thin and think tends to be pronounced as [t]; vowel reduction is mostly avoided in function words such as of and that; and there is an increasing incidence of rhoticity.

== Indonesian ==
Due to the increasing immigration from the Indonesian population to Brunei, it also increases the usage of the Indonesian language throughout the country. This includes the increasing usage in day-to-day conversations as well as business related activities such as advertising.

Indonesians are one of the major migrants in Brunei with around 80,000 of Indonesians residing in the country that has a total population of around 430,000 as of 2022.

== Chinese ==
The Chinese minority in Brunei speak a number of Chinese varieties. The main varieties of Chinese spoken include Hokkien, Cantonese and Hakka.

Mandarin is the language of instruction in some Chinese schools, and there are also some radio broadcasts in Mandarin. Mandarin is also used as the lingua franca among the Chinese community.

== Indigenous languages ==
Apart from Brunei Malay and Kedayan, the latter which may be considered a dialect of Malay, five indigenous minority ethnic groups are officially recognised in Brunei, each with their own language: Tutong, Belait, Dusun (Brunei), Bisaya, and Murut. Each of these five minority languages is threatened with extinction, though it has been reported that Murut (which is spoken mostly in the enclave of Temburong) is relatively healthy, partly because it receives some support across the Malaysian border in Lawas, where it is known as Lun Bawang.

Of these minority languages, Dusun and Bisaya are quite similar, and some have claimed they are varieties of the same language. It is also sometimes suggested that Tutong and Belait are related, though the level of shared lexicon for these two languages is just 54%.

Iban is also quite widely spoken in Temburong, and there is a small community of Penan speakers living in a longhouse along the Belait River.

== Arabic ==
Arabic is the language of the Quran and is used by Islamic scholars in Brunei. The official religion of Brunei is Islam and as such, all adherents of the faith possess some proficiency in reading and speaking Arabic.

Arabic is taught in schools, particularly religious schools. All muslim children are required by law to attend an Ugama School ('Religious School') for three hours five days per week from the ages of 7 till 15, and the curriculum of these schools promotes the learning of Arabic as well as skill using Jawi, the Arabic-based script for representing Malay.

In addition to the Ugama Schools, as of 2004, there were six Arabic schools and one religious teachers' college in Brunei.

== Indian languages ==
The Indian minority in Brunei originates mostly from southern India. They are joined by a relatively large expatriate community, estimated at 7,500, from India. Tamil is mainly spoken by Indians in Brunei.

== Nepali languages ==
There is also a contingent of Nepali soldiers of the Gurkha Reserve Unit in Sungai Akar camp and 1st and 2nd Battalion of the Royal Gurkha Rifles stationed in Seria, Brunei. The language spoken by most of these soldiers is Nepali. There are Nepali languages services provided by Radio Television Brunei and the British Forces Broadcasting Service.

== Expatriate languages ==
Besides the expatriate Indians, Brunei also has a large expatriate community of Filipino, Indonesian, Dutch, Korean and English-speaking origins. Betawi, Javanese, Sundanese, Ambonese and Batak languages are also spoken by immigrants from Indonesia.

== See also ==
- Demographics of Brunei
