= Muslim Southeast Asia =

Muslim Southeast Asia refers to the areas of Southeast Asia that have significant populations of Muslims. It includes:

- Most parts of Indonesia including most of Java, Sumatra, Kalimantan, West Nusa Tenggara, Maluku Islands and Sulawesi (Java and Sumatra alone have the majority of Indonesia's population).
- Peninsular Malaysia and Sabah
- Brunei
- Southern Philippines (Bangsamoro)
- Patani region and Satun
- Westernmost parts of Myanmar, near the Bangladeshi border.

Culturally, it would also include the Malay people of Singapore (which was historically a Malay Muslim populated island), several (mainly coastal) ethnic groups of Sarawak such as Melanau, Bisaya, Narom, Seru, Miriek, Kedayan and Sarawak Malays, Cham people of Cambodia and Vietnam, and other Muslim community in Southeast Asia.

== See also ==
- Islam in Southeast Asia
