= Bruneian nationality law =

Brunei Nationality Act

Cabinet of Brunei
- Long title: An Act to make provision for the status of a subject of His Majesty the Sultan and Yang Di-Pertuan, for the acquisition and loss of such status and for Brunei Darussalam and foreign honours, and for other purposes connected therewith
- Enacted by: Government of Brunei
- Enacted: 1 January 1962

Amended by
- Brunei Nationality Law, Chapter 15, 1984; Brunei Nationality Law, Chapter 15, 2002
- Status: Amended

The Bruneian nationality law governs the issues of citizenship and nationality of Brunei. The law regulates the nationality and citizenship status of all people who live in Brunei as well as all people who are of Bruneian descent. It allows the children of expatriates, foreigners as well as residents in Brunei to examine their citizenship status and if necessary, apply for and obtain citizenship of Brunei.

The primary law relating to Bruneian citizenship is the Nationality Act, 1962 drafted while Brunei was a British protectorate. The act was later amended in 1984 and 2002.

Bruneian citizens are also Commonwealth citizens as well.

== Citizenship ==
=== Nationality law of 1962 ===
Brunei while still under a British protectorate, granted citizenship to a subject of the Sultan of Brunei the status of a national of Brunei, only if they were a member of an indigenous group of the Malay race, namely Belait, Bisayah, Brunei, Dayak, Dusun, Layan, Kelabit, Kedayan, Kenyah, Murut or Tutong. The law excluded ethnic Chinese in Brunei whom the majority of, as of 2008, do not hold Bruneian citizenship. From 1962 to 2014, only 35,100 people had obtained Bruneian citizenship.

=== Jus sanguinis ===
According to the amended nationality law of 1984, one method of acquiring Bruneian nationality is via jus sanguinis (Citizenship by right of blood). This means one may acquire citizenship regardless of whether they were born on Bruneian sovereign territory or not, under certain conditions. Citizenship is automatically conferred if the minor is a member of the aforementioned indigenous groups or, born overseas to a Bruneian father who registers the minors birth within 6 months at a Bruneian diplomatic mission. The father has to be in the service of the government of Brunei or employed by any company registered in Brunei to be eligible. The 2002 amendment of the Bruneian nationality law allowed for citizenship to be conferred through not only the father of the child but also, the mother.

=== Naturalization ===
A valid resident who has resided in Brunei for 20 years in the preceding 25 years, including the two years immediately prior to applying, can apply for naturalization, provided they are:

- Of good character.
- Not likely to become a charge on the state.
- Proficient in the Malay language.
- Intending to settle permanently in Brunei.

The path to citizenship via naturalization is noted to consist of not only a mastery of the Malay language but also, a deep knowledge of Malay customs, culinary recipes and poetry. Such is the difficulty of the test that ethnic Malays themselves are purported to not be able to pass such a test of knowledge.

=== Registration ===
A resident born on Bruneian sovereign territory who is not a member of the aforementioned Malay groups, can apply for citizenship by registration, provided they are:

- Over the age of 18.
- Resided in Brunei for 12 out of the 15 years immediately preceding the date of their application, including a continuous period of two years.
- Proficient in the Malay language.
- Of good character.

=== Dual Citizenship ===
Brunei does not recognize dual citizenship and any citizen who obtains foreign citizenship loses their Bruneian citizenship.

== Benefits ==
The benefits of Bruneian citizenship affords a citizen the right to enlist in the armed forces, buy and own property, enjoy fully subsidized healthcare and tertiary education, in addition to holding a Bruneian passport. The benefits of Bruneian citizenship have been dubbed the shellfare system.
