= Tutong =

Tutong may refer to:

- Tutong District, Brunei
- Tutong (town), the administrative town of the Tutong District
- Tutong Camp, military base of the Royal Brunei Land Forces
- Tutong River, which flows through the Tutong District
- Tutong people, the main ethnic group in the Tutong District
- Tutong language, a Malayo-Polynesian language spoken by the Tutong
- Bisaya language (Borneo), another Malayo-Polynesian language spoken by the Tutong, also sometimes known as the Tutong language
- Tagalog scorched rice
