= Miriek people =

Ethnic group from Sarawak, Malaysia

Jatti Miriek

Total population
- 10,000

Regions with significant populations
- Sarawak, Malaysia

Languages
- Miriek dialect (native); Malaysian (Sarawak Malay)

Religion
- Islam

Related ethnic groups
- Kiput; Kenyah; Sarawakian Malays; Kayan; Tutong; Belait; Narom; Berawan

Miriek people (Malay: Orang Miriek, Miriek: Jatti Miriek), also spelled Meirek or Mirek are an Austronesian ethnic group indigenous to Miri in eastern Sarawak, Malaysia. They are the autochthonous people of the city of Miri and its surrounding areas.

== Origins ==
According to Miriek folk story, the Mirieks originated from the territories of Apo Kayan people around Kayan river between modern day Kalimantan and Sarawak. The territorial expansion of the Kayans caused the Mirieks to migrate northwards into areas of Baram river before settled around Miri river (Likoh Miraik) on the northeastern coast of Sarawak in what is now modern day city of Miri.

== Culture ==
Culturally, the Mirieks have close ties with their Malay neighbours and share many similar cultures and lifestyle, which is why the Mirieks are originally classified as Malays and were only recognized as a distinct ethnic group by the Sarawakian government in 2022. They are traditionally farmers and fishermen with strong ties to the land of Miri before rapid urbanization of the city due to the discovery of oil. The rapid urbanization of Miri caused the traditional lands of Miriek people becoming more threatened by developers.

== Languages ==
The Miriek language (Tuttot Miriek) belongs to the Berawan-Lower Baram branch of the Austronesian language family and is closely related to Berawan and Tutong languages. The language is considered endangered as younger generations prefer to speak Malay as their main language. There are efforts to revitalize the usage of Miriek and several books have been published in the language such as Bup Iddeh Itai and Panduan Bercakap Bahasa Jatti Miriek.

== Religion ==
Miriek people traditionally adhere to Sunni Islam due to its historical contacts with the Malay Sultanate of Brunei and played an important role in their ethnic identity. The Islamic elements of Miriek people can be seen in their clothes, culture and arts.

== Ethnic subgroups ==
There are two ethnic subgroups within Miriek people that is;

- Miriek Bahut - Historically, the Bahut Mirieks did not practice mixed marriages and often live within their communities.
- Miriek Permaisuri - According to a local folktale, Permaisuri Mirieks are said to be the descendants of a Bahut Miriek woman named Timah and Tahir who is the son of Ratu Permaisuri from Sulawesi. They are more receptive to intermarriages with other ethnic groups in Sarawak.

The main difference between these two groups is mainly historical and today, there is hardly any distinction between them.
