= Belait =

Belait can refer to either:

- Belait District of Brunei Darussalam
- Kuala Belait, the administrative town of the Belait District
- Belait (river) which flows through the Belait District of Brunei Darussalam.
- Belait people, an ethnic group indigenous to the Belait District
- Belait language, part of the Malayo-Polynesian group of languages.
- Belait, a variant of Vilāyat (Hindi विलायत, Urdu ولایت), used in India to refer to Great Britain (and sometimes Europe more generally), via Persian from the Arabic ولاية, wilāyah
