= Lelak language =

Extinct language of Malaysian Borneo

Lelak
- Native to: Malaysia
- Region: Sarawak
- Extinct: 1970s
- Language family: Austronesian: Malayo-Polynesian; North Bornean; North Sarawakan; Berawan–Lower Baram; Lower Baram; Lelak–Narom; Lelak

Language codes
- ISO 639-3: llk
- Glottolog: lela1246
- ELP: Lelak

Lelak is an extinct language of Malaysian Borneo. The Lelak people now speak Berawan.
