= Bumiputera =

Bumiputera may refer to:

- Bumiputera (Brunei), an indigenous people of Brunei
- Bumiputera (Malaysia), a term used in Malaysia to describe Malays, the Orang Asli of Peninsular Malaysia, various indigenous peoples of East Malaysia, and Peranakans

== See also ==
- Pribumi, Native Indonesians
