= Adai-adai (dance) =

Malay traditional dance

- Native name: Tarian Adai-adai
- Genre: Traditional dance
- Inventor: Brunei Malay (ethnic group)
- Origin: Brunei and Malaysia (Sabah & Labuan)

Adai-adai dance is a traditional dance of Bruneian Malay ethnic group in Brunei Darussalam, Sabah and Labuan in Malaysia, this dance is based on the life of the fishermen. This dance tells the story of a group of fishermen who go fishing in the sea while the women wait for their return to the beach to help collect the catch that will be obtained.

Adai-adai dance is usually danced by a pair of four men and four women accompanied by tambourines and gambus and singing with a rhythm almost similar to the Zapin dance rhythm. The adai-adai dance is usually held during the crowd of Bruneian Malay or to welcome the arrival of dignitaries. The dancers also wear colorful special costumes.

Sometimes no musical instrument is used, instead the sound that accompanies the singing is the paddler's hit on the part of the boat or paddle boat that is paddled as well as the pitcher or keduit blows.

Adai-adai is often performed at gatherings. It is also a Berunai (Brunei Malay ethnic group in Sabah) tribal dance that inhabits the town of Weston, Sabah.

== See also ==
- Bruneian
