= Kiput people =

Ethnic group from Borneo

Lakiput, Lepo Pu’un

Total population
- 2,000

Regions with significant populations
- Sarawak, Malaysia

Languages
- Kiput; Sarawak Malay

Religion
- Islam; Christianity

Related ethnic groups
- Belait; Tutong; Miriek; Apo-Duat (Kelabit, Berawan, Lun Bawang, Sa'ban); Other Orang Ulu peoples

The Kiput people, also known as Lakiput or Lepo Pu’un (meaning "early tribe") are an indigenous ethnic group native to northern Borneo, primarily residing in Sarawak, Malaysia. Historically, the Kiput have been concentrated along the Baram River, where they are among the earliest settled communities in the region. Over time, different Kiput subgroups have established distinct settlements, with some migrating to Brunei, where they are assimilated into the Puak Belait community. As of the 2000 census, the Kiput population was estimated to be around 2,000 people.

Traditionally reliant on subsistence farming, fishing and trade, the Kiput have undergone significant cultural and economic transformations, particularly following their conversion to Islam and Christianity in the 20th century. Despite these changes, the Kiput language remains a crucial element of their ethnic identity, though dialectal variations exist among different communities. Linguistically, the Kiput language is closely related to Belait, Miriek, Narum and Bakong.

In recent years, initiatives to preserve Kiput heritage have included the formal adoption of "Kiput" as the official ethnonym in 2024 and the recognition of the Kiput people as a Bumiputera group in Sarawak, contributing to greater acknowledgment of their cultural identity within Malaysia. These efforts continued with events such as the Adiit Mucu’ut Kiput Festival in 2025, which aims to celebrate and promote Kiput traditions.

== Terminology ==
In 2024, the Kiput community formally adopted "Kiput" as their official ethnonym, replacing the previously used term "Lakiput." This decision was made through a collective agreement among community leaders, customary authorities and members of the Sarawak Lakiput Association.

The change aimed to establish a standardized identity that reflects the community’s historical and cultural continuity. Representatives from key Kiput settlements, including Kampung Benawa, Kampung Hizrah Benawa, Kampung Kuala Tutoh and Kampung Lubok Nibong, participated in formalising this resolution.

== Distribution ==
The Kiput people are primarily concentrated in Sarawak and Brunei Darussalam, with distinct subgroups residing in different regions. In Sarawak, the Kiput Benawa and Kiput Kuala Tutoh communities continue to inhabit areas along the Baram River, the second-largest river in the state. Meanwhile, the Kiput Belait and Kiput Kiudang communities migrated to Brunei Darussalam several decades ago and have since established settlements there. In Brunei, the Kiput Belait community is now commonly referred to as Puak Belait by the local population.

== History ==
=== Early origins ===
The Kiput are believed to have migrated from the central Bornean highlands to the Baram River basin, where they became one of the earliest settled communities. Oral histories suggest that Kiput settlements had long-standing interactions with the Brunei Sultanate, influencing their language, governance structures, and social customs.

During the Brooke administration (1841–1946), Kiput leaders played a crucial role in local governance and advisory positions on Orang Ulu affairs. Prominent Kiput figures, including Jok Pengiran, Tinggang Jok, Manak Dapat, Penghulu Lejau, and Temenggong Lawai Lemayong, were entrusted with mediating indigenous affairs and advising on the geographical and political landscape of the Baram region.

=== Religious transformation ===
Prior to the introduction of Christianity and Islam, the Kiput people traditionally practiced animism, a belief system centered on the spiritual power of nature and ancestral reverence. However, by the 1920s, a significant portion of the Kiput population had converted to either Christianity or Islam, leading to notable changes in their social and cultural organization.

Christian Kiput communities have retained aspects of their traditional way of life, with many continuing to reside in a communal longhouse in Kuala Tutoh, Central Baram. This longhouse serves as both a residential and cultural center, maintaining the Kiput tradition of communal living. In contrast, Muslim Kiput populations have predominantly settled in traditional Malay villages, such as Kampung Benawa in Baram, where they have integrated Malay cultural and religious practices into their daily lives. A significant portion of the Kiput population has embraced Islam, particularly those in Benawa, Sarawak, as well as in Belait and Kiudang, Brunei.

Despite these religious transformations, the Kiput people continue to preserve their ethnic identity through their language and shared customs, which remain key elements of cultural continuity within the community.

=== Economic Activities and Modern Shifts ===
Traditionally, the Kiput engaged in subsistence-based economic activities such as rice cultivation, fishing and trading their catch at local markets like Pasar Marudi. These occupations were integral to their way of life for generations.

However, in recent decades, educational advancements have enabled many Kiput individuals to pursue higher education and secure employment beyond the Baram and Marudi areas. This shift has led to a growing presence of Kiput professionals in various sectors, including government administration, education and business. While this has contributed to economic advancement, it has also led to the erosion of traditional practices and a decline in Kiput-language speakers, posing challenges to cultural sustainability.

=== Recognition and Cultural Preservation of the Kiput Community ===
In 2024, the Kiput community achieved a significant milestone with its official recognition as a Bumiputera group in Sarawak. This recognition followed amendments to the Federal Constitution and the Sarawak Interpretation Ordinance, granting the Kiput people equal legal status with other indigenous communities in Malaysia.

To further promote and celebrate their heritage, the Kiput community announced plans for the inaugural Adiit Mucu’ut Kiput Festival in 2025. The festival aims to showcase Kiput traditions and contribute to Sarawak’s cultural tourism initiatives. Additionally, the Lakiput Association of Sarawak unveiled its official logo and honored senior members of the Kiput community for their contributions to cultural preservation and development. Government representatives encouraged collaboration between the association and the Sarawak government to secure additional support for these efforts.

As part of broader cultural preservation initiatives, the community has also undertaken steps to codify Kiput customary laws (Adet Kiput). Historically, the Kiput have referenced the Adat Kayan-Kenyah 1994 for customary matters, but this new codification marks a significant step toward formalising their legal and cultural identity within the broader Orang Ulu context.

== Culture ==
=== Language ===
Linguistic research indicates that Kiput shares a 74% lexical similarity with Belait, making it the most closely related language to Kiput. In comparison, Miriek exhibits a 60% cognate match with Kiput. These linguistic connections suggest a historical relationship among the languages spoken by indigenous communities in northern Borneo, particularly those along the Baram River and coastal Brunei.

=== Traditional attire ===
The traditional attire of the Kiput people features distinctive elements that set it apart from the clothing of other indigenous groups in Sarawak, such as the Kenyah, Berawan and Lun Bawang. A defining characteristic of Kiput attire is the prominent use of intricately woven songket fabric. The attire is further adorned with traditional accessories, including pekah (decorative headgear), kelasang (beaded necklaces), gelang (bracelets), talai pinggang (belts), and belao (elongated earlobes). These elements contribute to the distinct identity of Kiput traditional dress.

=== Wedding traditions ===
Marriage in Kiput culture is marked by a formal exchange of gifts between the groom and the bride’s family, symbolising unity and mutual respect. As part of the bride price, the groom is traditionally required to present a tawak (large gong), a parang Ilang (traditional sword), and other items such as a mattress.

A significant wedding ritual is Burek Panyi, a ceremonial blessing performed during the reception. In this ritual, the bride and groom sit on a tawak gong gifted by the bride’s family, while their parents recite a pantun (traditional poem) to invoke blessings for prosperity and fertility. The blessing traditionally includes a wish for the couple to have 16 children—eight boys and eight girls.

== See also ==
- Demographics of Sarawak
