= Tutong people =

Indigenous ethnic group in Brunei

Tutong Puak Tutong
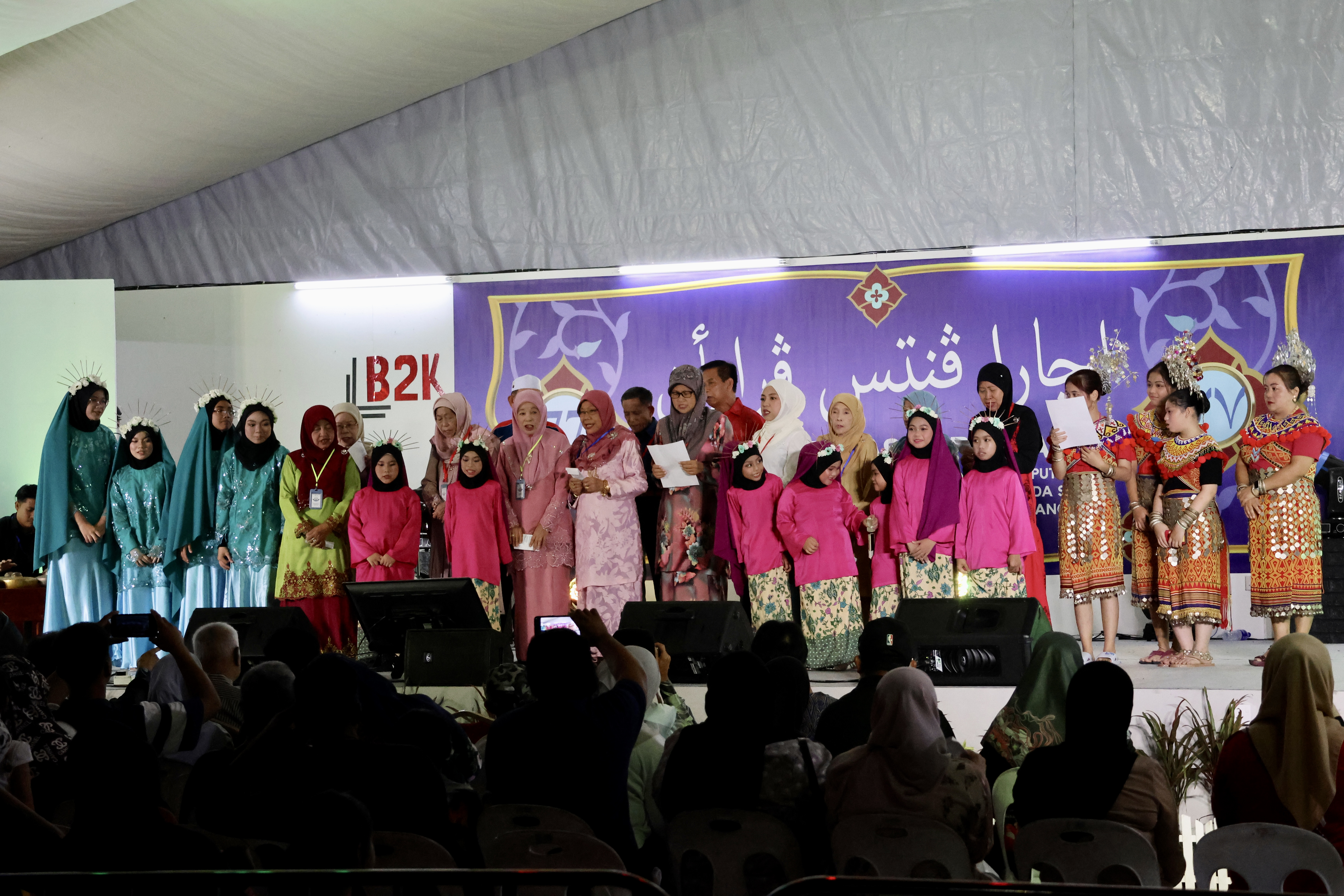
- Tutong people in 2023

Total population
- 16,958

Regions with significant populations
- Brunei
- Tutong District: 10,974

Languages
- Tutong, Malay (Brunei Malay)

Religion
- Islam

Related ethnic groups
- Belait, Miriek, Kiput, Other Indigenous peoples of Brunei

The Tutong people are an ethnic group native to Brunei, mainly in Tutong District. They traditionally speak the Tutong language. They are officially recognised as one of the seven ethnic groups of the Bruneian Malay race (jati Melayu).

== Etymology ==
The origin of the name 'Tutong' has been explained through various oral traditions. One version tells of a Murut man named Tutong who protected the people of Kampong Lurah Saban from headhunters (ayau) of the Kayan tribe. In gratitude, the river where he lived was named Sungai Tutong, now in Kampong Suran, which became the early settlement area for the Tutong people. Historical evidence supports this, including the discovery of human bones in jars (tajau) at Kampong Penanjong, believed to be an ancient Murut burial site. Additionally, remnants of Murut fruit plantations in Kampong Kiudang and Lamunin strengthen the link between the Murut and the Tutong region.

Another story suggests the name comes from Si Letong, a figure from Celebes, who initially lived in Sungai Papakan (now Kampong Telisai) before moving to Kampong Suran due to the ocean's noise. The river there was subsequently named Sungai Tutong. A more mythical account involves Tutong marrying a shark that could transform into a human, creating a pact of mutual safety between humans and sharks in the river or sea. While considered a myth, this tale highlights the significance of Tutong in local Malay traditions.

From these traditions, it is clear that the name 'Tutong' originated from an individual. Over time, the river where this person lived became known as Sungai Tutong (Tutong River), and those who settled there became known as the Tutong people. Initially, 'Tutong' referred not to an ethnic group but to the people living along the river, a common naming convention in Borneo. Similar examples include the Kelabit, named after the Labid River, and various river-dwelling groups in Sandakan and Kinabatangan. The Murut, for instance, derive their name from the Bajau word belud, meaning 'hill', while the Iban, whose name means 'travellers' in Kayan, reflect their nomadic nature.

The name 'Tutong' itself, like many Borneo ethnic groups, is often derived from external sources rather than self-designated. The Tutong are also known as Sang Keluyoh by the Dusun people, which means "people of the Keluyoh River," reflecting their historical presence in the area before the Dusun settled there. However, the name 'Tutong' has become more widely recognised, overshadowing the more specific Sang Keluyoh. This pattern is common among other Borneo tribes, where names often refer to geographic locations, and such labels can be fluid, depending on who is doing the naming.

The origin of the Tutong people remains unclear, but linguistic research suggests a potential link to the Baram Hilir (Lower Baram) region in Sarawak, Malaysia. The Tutong language, closely related to the Miri language spoken by the native people of the area, supports the hypothesis that the Tutong people may have originally come from this region. This theory is based on the observed linguistic similarities between the two languages. In their own language, the Tutong people refer to themselves as Bunu Tutong.

== History ==
The migration to these new inland villages not only fostered new settlements but also created an economic pattern. In the early to mid-20th century, the rubber industry became a key economic driver, with the price of rubber increasing significantly. This led the Tutong people to plant more rubber trees and acquire existing rubber plantations owned by the Dusun people, as the British government at the time prohibited villagers from planting new rubber trees. As a result, many Tutong people moved to areas such as Kampong Padnunok and Kiudang, which were rich in rubber plantations. Notably, one of the earliest settlers in Kampung Padnunok from Kampong Bakiau was Serudin bin Ahmad in 1938, who bought several acres of rubber land from a Dusun man, Taris bin Ikas. Additionally, the Penembang area became a hub for rice cultivation and other economic activities, including the harvesting of jelutong rubber and rumbia (sago palm). Early settlers in this region included Awang Taat and his wife, Dayang Jamilah, in the late 19th century.

Not all Tutong people who moved to the inland villages stayed there permanently. Some returned to their original villages when they found the new areas unsuitable for their livelihood. For example, Simpul bin Ghafar and his wife, Dayang Fatimah, originally from Kampong Penanjong, settled in Kampong Santul in the upper reaches of the Sungai Birau but eventually returned to their hometown as the area became less viable for settlement. Despite not residing in these areas, many Tutong people from Kampong Panchor, Suran, and Petani still maintain land in areas like Kampong Birau, Sambatang, and Santul, where they cultivate rice and raise buffalo. These lands continue to serve as a source of income for the people, even if they no longer live there.

The economic migration and settlement patterns of the Tutong people helped establish their dominance in the Tutong District. They not only controlled the Tutong River, which served as the region's main trading port, but also the surrounding hinterlands, which were rich in forest resources and fertile soil for rice cultivation. Furthermore, the Tutong people acquired large rubber plantations that had previously been owned by the Dusun. The results of their economic activities, particularly rubber, were traded through the Tutong River, cementing their role as central players in the district's economy.

== Language ==
The Tutong people are the traditional speakers of the Tutong language (Basa' Tutong), an Austronesian language. It is considered endangered. Notable initiatives to revitalise the language include the publication of a bilingual dictionary between Tutong and Malay by the Language and Literature Bureau, the Bruneian language authority, and the introduction of Tutong as a language subject in Universiti Brunei Darussalam.

== Population ==
The population is recorded to be 16,958 in Brunei. Majority is in Tutong District at 64.7%, followed by Brunei-Muara District at 24.5%, Belait District at 10.5% and Temburong District at 0.2%.

== Culture ==
=== Economy ===
The economic culture of the Tutong people is uniquely characterised by their involvement in agriculture and livestock farming, despite living along the Tutong River. Unlike the Bruneian Malays who live in Kampong Ayer and are primarily fishermen, the Tutong people's exploration of inland areas for agricultural purposes led to an assimilation with the Dusun people, who had long inhabited those regions. This transition from living on the river to settling on land marked a significant cultural shift for the Tutong people, particularly in the late 19th century, when they completely abandoned their life on the water. New villages were established in the interior, replacing settlements along the river. For instance, the residents of Lurah Saban relocated to Kampong Tanjong Maya and Kampong Bakiau, as they needed land for rice cultivation and rubber plantations. Similarly, those from Kuala Birau explored the inland areas and established new villages such as Pengkalan Lagu Adau, Sembatang, Santul, Tono Amas, and Birau.

=== Religion ===
The Tutong people are mostly Muslims. However, in the past, they had practiced animism. The exact point in time when they converted to Islam is not known, however it is thought to be related to the migration of the Muslims from Brunei proper and Sarawak and their marriage with the Tutong locals sometime in the 18th and 19th centuries.

=== Mythology ===
One of the famous folktales among the Tutong and Dusun people living in the upper Tutong and Belait regions is the story of the marriage of Raja Temanda and Puteri Gunung Mulu. Raja Temanda was the son of Penglima Guntur, the chief of the Dusun tribe who resided in Kampong Merimbun. His profession was to harvest rumbia (sago palm) to obtain ambulung (sago starch), which he did at a location in Kampong Merangking. One day, he discovered that the ambulung he had stored in his boat had scattered on the ground. This occurred over several days, leading him to suspect that the cause was either human or animal mischief. To confirm this, he decided to secretly observe the area at night, hiding in a makeshift shelter called sawang ripau, to discover the culprit. On the 14th night, when the moonlight was at its brightest, a light appeared, brighter than the moonlight, resembling lightning. This light descended onto Raja Temanda's rumbia-harvesting area. Seven flashes of light descended in turn. Raja Temanda, amazed by this event, realised that the lights were the princesses descending from Gunung Mulu to bathe in a nearby well, now known as Telaga Pemandian Puteri (Princess's Bath). The marks of their bath still remain as seven circular depressions in the ground, believed to be where the princesses bathed, each princess taking her turn, starting with the eldest and ending with the youngest. When one finished bathing, she would fly back to her home, to be replaced by the next princess.

Raja Temanda, who had been watching them, became enamoured with the beauty of the youngest princess. Seizing the opportunity, he decided to prevent her from returning home by hiding her sarong while she bathed. When the princess tried to fly back, she realised her sarong was gone and was left disheartened. It was then that Raja Temanda captured her and took her back to his house. With no other choice, the princess agreed to become his wife. Their marriage resulted in the birth of a daughter, Puteri Ba'aiah. Their lives became happier with the arrival of their child. However, Raja Temanda had to leave his wife and child for a while due to his work with rumbia harvesting. One day, as his wife was feeding their child, the kuil (spoon) used to feed the child fell under the house. As she went down to retrieve it, she unexpectedly found the sarong she had lost hidden beneath the floorboards. This sarong had been concealed by Raja Temanda to prevent her from leaving him. Although the princess had long searched for it without success, upon finding it, she quickly wore it and prepared to return to her homeland, Gunung Mulu. Although she was reluctant to leave her beloved child, the desire to return overwhelmed her. Thus, her child was left alone in the cradle. Not long after, a cobra entered the house and coiled up in the cradle with the child. The cobra was sent to protect the child, whom Raja Temanda had abandoned. The cobra remained with the child until she grew into a beautiful princess. Her beauty captured the heart of Bendahari Julak, a messenger from Brunei, who came to Raja Temanda's residence and eventually married the princess.

After many years of marriage, a tragedy struck their household when the princess had an illicit affair with one of Bendahari Julak's warriors who lived in the village. Bendahari Julak punished them both by executing them with a spear. The execution took place in an area between Kampong Merangking and Kampong Bukit, in upper Belait. Although his wife was sentenced to death, their marriage produced several children, who became their descendants, continuing through today. These descendants later contributed to the Dusun and Tutong tribes living in Kampong Tanjong Maya.

== Notable people ==
- Abu Bakar Jambol (1897–1976), community leader and civil servant
- Pengiran Muhammad Yusuf (1923–2016), diplomat, politician and writer
- Taha Abdul Rauf (born 1933), educator and legislative councillor
- Abidin Abdul Rashid (1939–2020), politician and civil servant
- Sulaiman Damit (1941–2016), military officer
- Husin Ahmad (born 1944), military officer
- Abdul Ghafar Ismail (born 1951), diplomat and civil servant
