= Brunei English =

Dialect of English

Brunei English (similar and related to British English) is a regional dialect of English that is widely spoken in Brunei Darussalam, even though the national language is Malay. Although the lingua franca in the country is generally the local dialect of Malay, all educated people are proficient in English, as it has been the medium of instruction from the fourth year of primary school since 1985.

There are various features that make Brunei English distinct: for pronunciation, the sound at the start of a word such as three is often [t] rather than [θ], and there is usually a full vowel rather than [ə] in function words such as as, than, and of; for grammar, furnitures and jewelleries are treated as plural nouns, and there is variable use of the third-person −s suffix on present-tense verbs; and for lexis, many words are borrowed from Malay to reflect local customs, including titah (a speech by the Sultan) and tudung (a head scarf). Some of these features are shared with other varieties of Southeast Asian English, but others make Brunei English a distinct variety.

Colloquial portmanteau words for Brunei English are 'Brulish' (recorded from 2003) and 'Brunglish' (recorded from 2007).

== History and education ==
Brunei was a British protectorate from 1888 until it became independent in 1984, when it joined ASEAN. English became widely used, even though Brunei Malay (a dialect of Malay that is substantially different from Standard Malay) continues to be the main language that is spoken.

In 1985, the Bilingual Education Policy was implemented, with Malay as the medium of instruction for the first three years of primary school, and then English as the medium of instruction for most subjects from the fourth year of primary school on. In 1993, history switched from being English-medium to being Malay-medium.

In January 2009, a new education policy was implemented. It is termed SPN21 (Sistem Pendidikan Negara – Abad 21, 'National Education System for the 21st Century'). In this new system, mathematics and science are taught in English from the start of primary school.

English is well-established in Brunei, though it does not seem to be challenging the position of Malay. Rather more threatened are the minority languages such as Dusun (Dusun Brunei), Tutong and Murut (Lun Bawang), which seem to be getting squeezed out by the two dominant languages, though recent research in Temburong District suggests that Murut is surviving better than the other two.

== Variation ==
There is substantial variation in the English spoken in Brunei. Two sources of variation are mentioned here: education and ethnicity.

There is rather a wide educational divide. Those who attend private schools and the best government schools usually achieve an excellent standard in English; but those who go to less fashionable schools often end up with only rudimentary skills in English.

There is also some variation in Brunei English arising from the ethnicity of speakers. Research undertaken in 2011 showed that undergraduates at the University of Brunei Darussalam (UBD) could identify whether a fellow undergraduate was Malay or Chinese on the basis of 10 seconds of spoken English with an accuracy of about 74%, which suggests that the English pronunciation of the two ethnic groups differs to some extent.

== Pronunciation ==
Some of the salient features of the pronunciation of English in Brunei are:

- The consonant at the start of words like thin and thank tends to be pronounced as [t] rather than [θ].
- The vowel in function words such as of and that tends to be a full vowel rather than [ə].
- Pairs of long and short vowels are merged by some speakers, with the result that beat and bit may be homophones, and similarly fool and full often sound the same. In an investigation of the speech of 53 undergraduates, 14 were found to have the same vowel quality in feast and fist, but the proportion of speakers who merge these two vowels is almost certainly higher for less well-educated speakers.
- Spelling pronunciation affects some words, so salmon tends to have an [l] in it, and the first syllable of company has [ɒ] rather than [ʌ] for about half of undergraduates at the University of Brunei Darussalam.

One current change that seems to be taking place is that Brunei English is becoming more rhotic, partly influenced by American English and also by the rhoticity of the Malay spoken in Brunei, although English in neighbouring Malaysia and Singapore remains mostly non-rhotic.

== Grammar ==
A few of the salient features of Brunei English grammar are:

- Logically plural nouns are found with an −s suffix, even if they are uncount nouns in other varieties of English. Examples are 'equipments', 'infrastructures' and 'jewelleries'. This is found in a wide range of other New Varieties of English around the world.
- one of is often followed by a singular noun, so one finds utterances like 'one of the queen were beheaded' and 'he is one of the main character'.
- Use of the −s suffix on verbs to indicate a third-person singular subject is variable.
- would is often used to indicate something tentative.

== Lexis ==
There is widespread borrowing of words from Malay into Brunei English. These include titah (a speech by the Sultan), sabda (a speech by another member of the royal family), tudung (a head-dress worn by women) and puasa ('fasting'). Words for local food are often borrowed from Malay, such as kuih ('a local cake'), as in 'A variety of Malay kuih and sliced fruits will also be served'.

Use of Malay terms in the English spoken in Brunei can sometimes lead to loss of intelligibility, such as Ugama Schools ('religious schools') being misunderstood as 'government schools' by someone from the Maldives.

Many initialisms are found, including:

- UBD : Universiti Brunei Darusslam
- BSB : Bandar Seri Begawan (the capital of Brunei)
- PTE : Pusat Tingkatan Enam ('Sixth Form Centre')
- OGDC : Oil and Gas Discovery Centre
- GOFR : General Order Financial Regulations

Acronyms (where the letters create a word) are not so common, but we find:

- RIPAS [ripas] : Raja Isteri Pengiran Anak Saleha (the Hospital in BSB, named after the Queen)
- MOFAT [mɒfæt] : Ministry of Foreign Affairs and Trade
- SHBIE [ʃɪbɪ] : Sultan Hassanal Bolkiah Institute of Education

There are some idiosyncratic expressions in Brunei English, such as dry season to refer to the period just before payday when people are short of money, as in 'I cannot pay now: dry season bah!'

== Mixing ==
Mixing of English and Malay is widespread in informal discourse in Brunei. An investigation of the language used in an English-medium discussion forum showed that nearly half of all postings were partly or completely in Malay. In data involving a map task, where one participant has to guide a second participant along a route, a speaker said:

uh so jalan saja uh continue macam ada a bit cornering

with four words of Malay in the English utterance: jalan (walk), saja (just), macam (like) and ada (there is). This utterance means 'just go and continue, like there's a bit of cornering'.

== See also ==
- Commonwealth English
