= Dusun people (Brunei) =

Indigenous ethnic group of Brunei

Sang Jati Dusun
Total population
- 10,000~

Regions with significant populations
- Brunei (Nationwide, notably in Tutong District and Belait District)

Languages
- Dusun; Brunei Malay; Brunei English

Religion
- Sunni Islam; Christianity; Animism

Related ethnic groups
- Bisaya; Dusun; Belait; Murut; Tutong; Kedayan; Bruneian Malays

The Dusun people of Brunei, also known as Sang Jati or Suang Jati, are an indigenous ethnic group primarily residing in the Tutong and Belait Districts of Brunei. They constitute one of the seven indigenous ethnic groups in Brunei Darussalam, known locally as the Sang Jati Dusun.

The Brunei Dusun ethnic group is closely related to the Bisaya ethnic group of Limbang, with a strong presence in Tutong district and scattered communities in Belait. Their cultural richness, distinct traditions and linguistic diversity significantly contribute to Brunei's cultural heritage.

== Etymology ==
=== Dusun ===
The term "Dusun" has a complex and multifaceted etymology, reflecting historical, cultural, and linguistic influences. The word Dusun is a Malay term that literally means "people of the orchards." It was originally used to refer to groups of people living in the inland regions of North Borneo. In the context of the Dusuns in Brunei, their contact with coastal Malays led to the imposition of the "Dusun" ethnic label. This designation was primarily due to their inland residence, which was surrounded by fruit orchards and coconut plantations, and their occupation as rice farmers and fruit growers.

Originally an exonym given by the Bruneian Malays. Over time, it became an official term used by both the Brunei Sultanate and the colonial administration to refer to various indigenous communities in the region.

=== Sang Jati ===
The Dusun people, also known as "Sang Jati" in their own endonym, have a distinct understanding of their identity. In the Bruneian Dusun language, sang means tribe or ethnic group, and jati means "ours" or "us." The Dusun community in Brunei refers to themselves as Sang Jati rather than the Dusun tribe, a term originally associated with their traditional farming practices of rice cultivation and fruit farming. Despite its origins, the Sang Jati community embraces the name Dusun with pride.

The term "Sang Jati" gained prominence in the 1960s with the establishment of the Pakatan Sang Jati Dusun association, marking a significant moment in the reclamation of their identity. Before this, the Dusun people were known by various names, reflecting regional and contextual variations. The adoption of "Sang Jati" signified a unified and empowered identity for the community.

=== Other names ===
Before the widespread use of "Dusun", outsiders commonly referred to the Dusun people as "Bisaya" or "Orang Bukit" (the Hill People). These terms were prevalent until the early 20th century and were used interchangeably to denote the Dusun communities.

However, because the Dusuns demonstrated some similarities with other ethnic groups in the country, particularly the Bisayas, the Belaits, and the Tutongs, the term "Dusun" was inevitably used interchangeably with the terms Kedayan, Dusun Tutong, Iddeh Kitah, Sang Kedayan, Idahan, Bisaya, Tutong and Belait. These names and terms are used to refer to the Brunei Dusun as communities having similar 'cultural stock' or linguistically very closely related to each other.

These diverse names for the Dusuns led to some ambiguity, which was clarified by the Constitution of Brunei in 1959 and later by the passing of the Nationality Law in 1961. The Nationality Law offers an authoritative classification that defines the Dusuns, the Tutongs, the Bisayas and the Belaits as four of the seven separate ethnic groups.

== Settlements ==
The Dusun population in Brunei primarily inhabits the Tutong and Belait Districts. Although precise statistics are challenging to ascertain, estimates indicate that the majority of the Dusun reside in the Tutong District, with significant populations in villages such as Bukit Sawat, Sungai Mau, Merangking, Ukong, Kiudang, Lamunin, and Rambai. Smaller numbers are also found in the interior of the Brunei Muara District.

Dusun settlements are spread across various regions in Brunei:

- Coastal Settlements: Danau, Telisai, Sungai Liang, and Lumut.
- Lowland Settlements: Located along the Tutong river valley in villages such as Sungai Damit, Ukong, Rambai, and others.
- Upland Settlements: Situated in the Tutong and Belait Districts, including Bukit Udal, Long Mayan, Merimbun, Merangking, Bukit Sawat, and Sukang.

== History ==
=== Early history ===
The history of the Dusun people is deeply rooted in their settlements across the highland and lowland areas of Brunei, spanning centuries of tradition and cultural evolution. Traditionally, Dusun society was structured around compact nucleated settlements, creating close-knit communities that fostered strong kinship ties and intermarriages within the group. This communal way of life was integral to their identity and played a vital role in shaping their social structure.

During the era of Brunei Sultanate rule, which dates back centuries, the societal dynamics of the Dusun people began to undergo gradual transformations. Bilateral kin groups, led by respected male elders known as tatuwo, formed the foundation of their egalitarian society. These tatuwo acted as community leaders, mediators and guardians of tradition, maintaining harmony and resolving disputes within the community.

Over time, as Brunei's political landscape evolved, the roles and status of these tatuwo also evolved. Some tatuwo began to acquire titles such as orang kaya, signifying a shift towards a more stratified society where they held increased authority and status. This transition reflected broader changes in governance and power dynamics within Brunei.

The interaction with the Brunei Malay Sultanate and later with the British Residency further influenced the roles of Dusun leadership. Some Dusun tatuwo were appointed to positions like menteri darat (land chiefs) and ketua kampung (village headmen), granting them significant influence in local governance and administration. This integration into formal administrative structures marked a significant shift in the role of Dusun leaders within the broader political framework.

=== Adaptation and preservation ===
The discovery of oil in the 1930s marked a significant turning point for the Dusun people of Brunei. The subsequent dominance of the oil economy in the 1970s led to profound changes in Dusun society. Many Dusun individuals migrated to urban areas in search of wage labor opportunities, drawn by the promise of stable jobs in the government and private sectors.

This migration had a dual impact on traditional Dusun village economies. On one hand, it brought economic stability to families through wage labor. On the other hand, it led to the abandonment of traditional rice cultivations, which had long been the backbone of Dusun tradition and livelihood. The shift from agrarian lifestyles to wage-based employment also influenced social and cultural dynamics within the Dusun community. Traditional practices tied to rice cultivation and village life underwent changes, reflecting the broader transformations in Brunei's social fabric driven by its oil industry.

In contemporary times, the traditional roles of village leaders like the ketua kampung and penghulu have evolved into administrative positions within the state structure. These leaders now serve as mediators between the community and government institutions, selected based on merit and administrative capabilities rather than solely on lineage or seniority.

With the onset of modernization and the development of a market-oriented economy, there was a noticeable decline in traditional communal activities and ceremonies like weddings, funerals and temarok rites among the Dusun people. The adoption of modern lifestyles also contributed to a gradual weakening of the social fabric based on traditional customs and familial bonds. This shift highlights the complex interplay between economic development and cultural heritage among the Dusun people.

Amidst these changes, the early 1960s saw the establishment of the Pakatan Sang Jati Dusun (PSJD) in Bukit Udal. This association aimed to preserve Dusun language, culture and unity. Despite challenges, PSJD continues to be a cultural reference point and plays a role in promoting cultural awareness among younger generations.

== Language ==
The Dusun language belongs to the Austronesian language family and demonstrates significant linguistic diversity, with distinct dialects influenced by ecological settings and neighboring ethnic groups. Estimating the exact population of Dusun speakers is challenging due to categorisations such as 'Malay' for Dusun individuals who have embraced Islam. However, estimates suggest a population range of 10,000 to 20,000, primarily residing in the Tutong District of Brunei.

The linguistic landscape of Brunei encompasses the classification of Bruneian Dusun and Bisaya as the Dusunic languages, although officially recognised as separate ethnic groups. Scholars note that Dusun and Bisaya are mutually intelligible dialects with a shared lexical cognate level of 82%, indicating linguistic similarities between them. These similarities are further supported by phonological resemblances, as observed by researchers. However, dialectal differences exist, such as the realization of 'r' as an alveolar trill /r/ in coastal areas and a velar fricative /ɣ/ in inland areas, reflecting the linguistic diversity within the Dusun and Bisaya communities of Brunei.

The language is classified into coastal, lowland and upland dialects. Coastal Dusun communities use the Liang-Telisai dialect, while upland Dusun speakers use an upland Bukit dialect. The lowland Dusun dialect is considered the 'standard Dusun language' and is widely spoken, with variations adapted in urban areas. Distinct dialects are observed in different Dusun settlements, such as Danau, Telisai, Sungai Liang and Lumut for coastal Dusun, and Bukit and Merimbun for upland Dusun. The Dusun community exhibits significant linguistic diversity, with dialects influenced by neighboring ethnic groups like the Malay, Iban, Penan and Tutong.

Key institutions like Universiti Brunei Darussalam and organisations such as the Sang Jati Dusun Association (PSJD) actively contribute to promoting the Dusun language and preserving its cultural heritage. In recent decades, the Dusun language has gained recognition in linguistic studies, leading to initiatives for its preservation and promotion through education and media platforms. PSJD's cultural awareness efforts have played a significant role in revitalizing the Dusun language and heritage.

== Culture ==
The Dusun people's identity is deeply intertwined with their religious practices, ecological surroundings and linguistic heritage. This blend of influences reflects a dynamic and resilient cultural fabric, continually evolving through internal adaptations and external influences.

As the Dusun language and culture face the threat of extinction, several seminars introduce the Dusun way of life, including exposure to their language, culture, diet, medicine, crafts and dance. These efforts, along with initiatives from other community-based organizations such as the Majlis Perwakilan Kampung (Village Representative Council) and PSJD, aim to increase awareness and enhance the status of the Dusun language, providing more confidence and economic value to both the language and its native speakers.

=== Traditional social structure ===
In traditional Dusun society, the alai gayo, or "big house," served as a central family residence and administrative hub. These longhouses could accommodate three to four generations of bilateral family members. The alai gayo was governed by an influential council of elders known as tetuwo, who were both social and religious leaders.

The Dusun social system was historically egalitarian but patrifocal, with males typically handling social welfare, economic matters and political decisions. Tetuwo were respected for their wisdom, knowledge and achievements, playing crucial roles in customary law, public matters and religious administration. While most tetuwo were male, females could also assume this role, often serving as belian (priestess) or belian pengiaw (chief priestess). These leaders were responsible for overseeing Dusun religious ceremonies referred to as temarok.

The traditional social structure of the Dusun people is defined by autonomous bilateral descent groups known as waris. These kin groups, encompassing multiple generations, are essential in preserving social cohesion without establishing superiority over one another. Members of a waris trace their lineage to a tatuwo, a respected male elder who serves as the genealogical reference point. This common ancestry is crucial for establishing each member's rights and status within the kin group. The tatuwo's role extends beyond genealogy; they also play a vital role in consulting customary laws (adat) and providing social leadership within the community.

Family plays a crucial role in the preservation of Dusun identity. Values such as respecting elders and maintaining family bonds are passed down through generations. Family and community gatherings, such as weddings, funerals and feasts, are essential for demonstrating ethnic involvement and fostering a sense of belonging. Nowadays, Dusun people live in single houses distributed in small clusters of hamlets. This shift from traditional longhouses to individual homes resulted from changes in the traditional administrative system following British colonialism in Brunei, which began in 1906. The long-house dwelling patterns began to disappear in the 1950s as the Dusuns began to build individual houses during this period.

The changes in the dwelling patterns from longhouses to individual residences had minimal impact on the living arrangements of the Dusuns, where multiple families of different generations still live together under one household or in close proximity to each other's houses. This indicates that the kinship ties between the Dusuns of different generations have remained intact and even strengthened despite the changing preferences in dwelling style. Moreover, as most Dusuns own land that they acquire through hereditary succession, building individual houses on their inherited acreage guarantees the preservation of their kin relationship.

=== Traditional belief system ===
Thetemarok belief encompasses a series of ritual performances divided into the monthly temarok diok (minor temarok) ceremony and the annual temarok gayo (major temarok) rice festival. These ceremonies are conducted to appease a mystical group of supernatural beings known as derato, believed to reside in pagun swat (the 'upper world') located in the sky.

According to Dusun mythology, these deities bestowed the Dusun people with their initial rice seeds, marking the genesis of temarok rituals. Before receiving these seeds, legend has it that the Dusun people subsisted on charcoal instead of rice. Consequently, Dusun balian regularly perform temarok ceremonies to invite the derato down to earth, seeking blessings for the people and sharing in entertainment with the balian and Dusun community.

Traditionally, newly harvested rice is presented in specific manners during temarok ceremonies, often taking the form of games with ceremonial names like temarok berayo (crocodile temarok ceremony), temarok lanut (snake temarok ceremony), temarok dulang (rice tray temarok ceremony), among others.

In addition to human beings, Dusun belief includes the existence of isi, malevolent spirits tasked with upholding social norms and enforcing taboos. Isi inhabit various locations such as trees, rivers, and underground areas, claiming jurisdiction over these territories. When angered, an isi may harm individuals, prompting families to seek assistance from a belian, or priestess. The belian may then conduct a temarok, utilizing her spirit to negotiate with the isi.

=== Oral traditions ===
The Dusun people maintain a repertoire of sung epic tales known as siram ditaan, which amount to roughly 40 titles. Siram is a traditional Dusun song performed in verses following the rhythmic beat of a dumbak drum. There are two main categories of siram songs: siram sindir and siram ditaan. Siram sindir, also known as siram nasihat (advisory siram), is used to convey criticism and advice. Both female and male singers can perform this type of siram, which is composed spontaneously in the presence of the criticized person(s) using allegories and metaphors to conceal its real meaning from the general listeners.

On the other hand, siram ditaan consists of epic narratives about the derato, supernatural beings central to Dusun mythology. These epics, which can take several evenings to recount, are performed by talented siram singers who are generally female and sometimes also balian (priestesses). The epic tales depict the romantic lives and feuds among members of the derato community and are composed of stocked phrases that are archaic and carry no meaning to modern Dusun listeners. Siram ditaan is very difficult to master, and proficient singers are rare today. Consequently, most raconteurs prefer to narrate the epic tales in ordinary Dusun language, where they are known as kata-kata (narrated words) instead of sung verses.

Both types of siram songs are usually performed at major Dusun social gatherings, such as wedding ceremonies, 'cleansing' ceremonies for newly completed houses, and temarok ceremonies. These performances play a crucial role in preserving and perpetuating the cultural and oral traditions of the Dusun people.

=== Harvest festival ===
Adau Gayoh is a significant cultural celebration among the Brunei Dusun ethnic group, marking the end of the paddy harvesting season. This festive period lasts for a month, beginning on the 1st of May. During Adau Gayoh, the Dusun people don their traditional costumes and engage in visits to the homes of relatives and friends. The celebration is characterized by various cultural activities, including traditional dances and music performances.

Several traditional dances are performed during Adau Gayoh, each with its unique rhythm and style. These dances include Ancayau, Kasapi Imang-Imang, Tak Injul Tulak Bangikat Tapi Butan, Kataduh Lait Lalau and Ebang Bataring. The dances are accompanied by distinctive musical beats including drums and Gulintangan that add to the festive atmosphere.

Adau Gayoh is not solely about dances, music and costumes. Traditional food plays a central role in the celebrations. Various types of traditional dishes are prepared and offered on the puun (a tiered tray traditionally used to display a variety of food items such as penyaram, nubor lopot, kelupis and bananas), which serves as the main centerpiece of the Adat Panakod (customary feast). This feast showcases the culinary heritage of the Dusun people, emphasizing the importance of food in their cultural practices.

Adau Gayoh is a significant cultural event for the Dusun community, reflecting their agricultural traditions, cultural heritage, and communal bonds.

== Notable people ==
- Lukan Uking, community leader
- Othman Uking (born 1937), legislative councillor

== See also ==
- Demographics of Brunei
- Indigenous peoples of Brunei
