= Indigenous peoples of Brunei =

Legal term describing indigenous Malay peoples of Brunei

The indigenous peoples of Brunei are Bruneian people who belong to the ethnic groups considered indigenous to the country. It is more commonly attributed to indigenous people of the Malay race belonging to the seven ethnic groups, namely: Brunei, Tutong, Belait, Dusun, Murut, Kedayan and Bisaya. The local term rakyat jati refers to citizens of indigenous descent, in particular the aforementioned seven ethnic groups. The term bumiputera has also been sometimes used to refer to the indigenous peoples.

== Definition ==
According to the Brunei Nationality Act, the indigenous people of Brunei are mainly classified into Malays and non-Malays. Indigenous Malays comprise the following ethnic groups:

- Brunei
- Tutong
- Belait
- Dusun (Brunei)
- Murut
- Kedayan
- Bisaya

Meanwhile the indigenous people other than the Malays are defined in the First Schedule of the Act to comprise the following ethnic groups:

- Bukitans
- Dayaks (sea)
- Dayaks (land)
- Kelabits
- Kayans
- Kenyahs (including Sabups and Sipengs)
- Kajangs (including Sekapans, Kejamans, Lahanans, Punans, Tanjongs and Kanowits)
- Lugats
- Lisums
- Melanaus
- Penans
- Sians
- Tagals
- Tabuns
- Ukits

== Precedence ==
Being accorded the status of rakyat jati ('indigenous citizens') in Brunei carries with it certain benefits and opportunities which other non-indigenous citizens may not have access to. Skim Tanah Kurnia Rakyat Jati (translates as "Landless Indigenous Citizens' Scheme") is a public housing scheme which allows the rakyat jati people to acquire land and home in the allocated public housing estates. The Royal Brunei Armed Forces primarily employ the indigenous Malays. In the Brunei Constitution, the government ministers and deputy ministers must be of "the Malay race professing the Islamic Religion, save where His Majesty the Sultan and Yang Di-Pertuan otherwise decides."

== Concerns ==
The justification for these special privileges and affirmative action schemes is that the bumiputera or the indigenous people face disadvantages due to the success of other groups in society, for example the Chinese. One case of such disadvantage can be seen in the demise of the construction industry in Brunei. The building sector is a major employer of Bumiputeras and forms the lifeblood of many Bumiputera families.

According to Minority Rights Group International, the non-Muslim indigenous people are continuously "banned" from conducting non-Islamic religious activities, and "pressured" and "incentivized" to convert to Islam. It also claimed that the government policy and legislation discourage indigenous cultures and languages.

There is a lack of "opposition" to the bumiputera concept in Brunei due to the country being an autocratic sultanate and the lack of political diversity.

== See also ==
- Bumiputera (Malaysia)
- Malayness
- Pribumi (Native Indonesians)
- Malay world
- Malay Archipelago
- East Indies
- Malay race
- Maphilindo
- Nusantara
- Greater Indonesia
