= Kiput language =

Austronesian language spoken in Sarawak, Malaysia

Kiput
- Native to: Malaysia
- Region: Northern Sarawak, Borneo
- Native speakers: (2,500 cited 1981)
- Language family: Austronesian: Malayo-Polynesian; North Bornean; North Sarawakan; Berawan–Lower Baram; Lower Baram; Kiput–Belait; Kiput

Language codes
- ISO 639-3: kyi
- Glottolog: kipu1237
- ELP: Kiput

Kiput is a Malayo-Polynesian language primarily spoken by the Kiput people in northern Sarawak, Borneo, Malaysia.

== Phonology ==
While the Northern Sarawakan languages in general are known for unusual phonological developments (for example, Proto-North Sarawak bʰ becomes s in Kiput), Kiput stands out from the rest.

=== Vowels ===
Kiput has eight monophthongs /i ɪ e u ʊ o ə a/, at least twelve diphthongs /iw ew uj oj əj əw aj aw iə̯ eə̯ uə̯ oə̯/ and two triphthongs /iə̯j iə̯w/.

=== Consonants ===
Kiput consonants
		Labial	Alveolar	Palatal	Velar	Glottal
Nasal		m	n	ɲ	ŋ	
Plosive	Voiceless	p	t	c	k	ʔ
Plosive	Voiced	b	d	(ɟ)	ɡ	
Fricative		f	s			h
Liquid	Lateral		l			
Liquid	Rhotic		r			
Semivowel		w		j		
