= Demographics of Brunei =

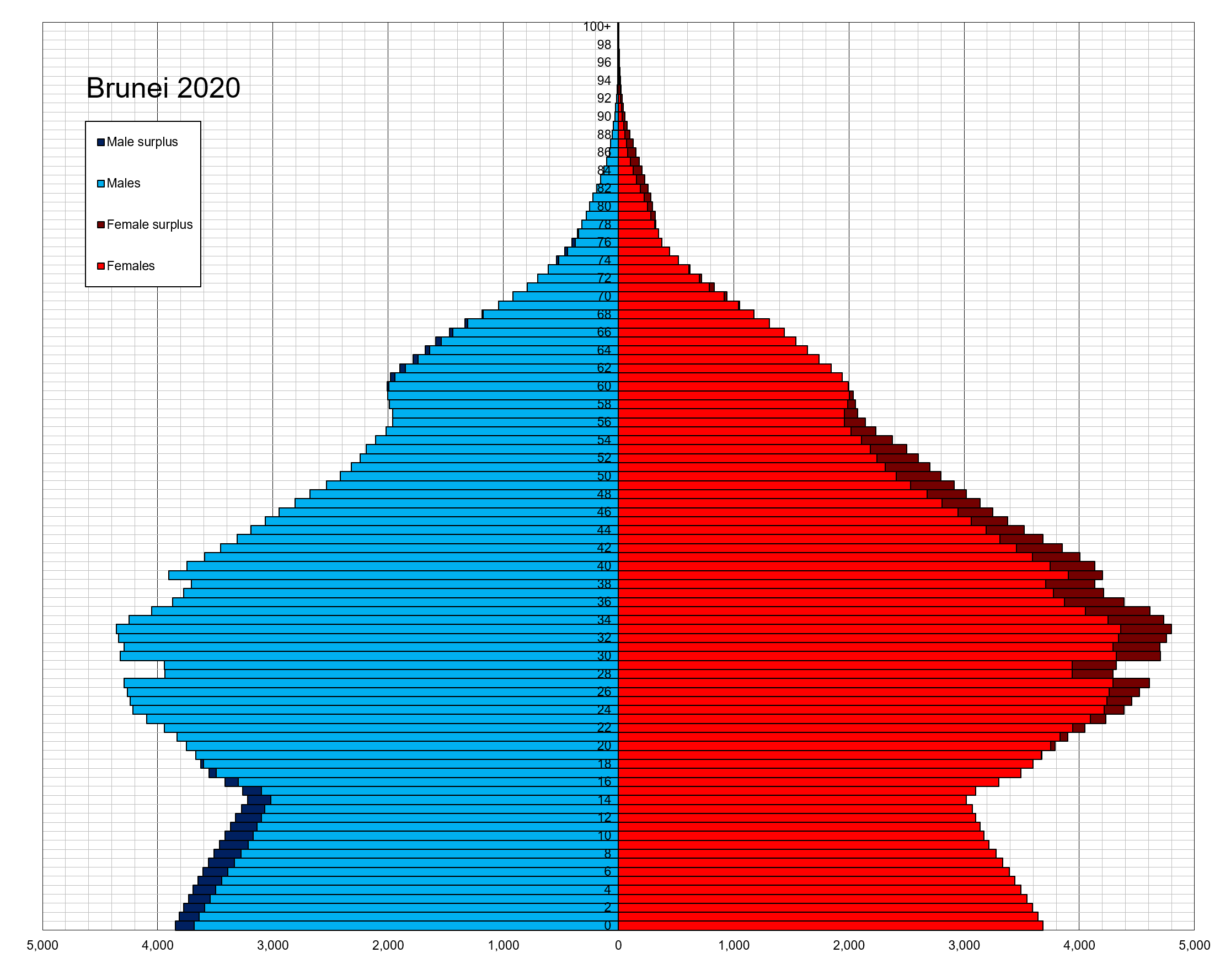
Brunei population pyramid in 2020

The demographic features of Brunei include population density, ethnicity, education level, health of the populace, economic status, religious affiliations and other aspects of the population. Like neighbouring countries, Brunei is a Malay-majority country. Many cultural and linguistic differences make Brunei Malays distinct from the larger Malay populations in nearby Malaysia and Indonesia, even though they are ethnically related and share the Muslim religion.

Brunei has a hereditary nobility with the title Pengiran these are, more often than not, related to the Sultan by blood. The Sultan can award to commoners the title Pehin, the equivalent of a life peerage awarded in the United Kingdom. The Sultan also can award his subjects the Dato, the equivalent of a knighthood in the United Kingdom, and Datin, the equivalent of a damehood.

Bruneians adhere to the practice of using complete full names with all titles, including the title Haji (for men) or Hajjah (for women) for those who have made the Haj pilgrimage to Mecca. Many Brunei Malay women wear the tudong, a traditional head covering. Men wear the songkok, a traditional Malay cap. Men who have completed the Haj wear a white songkok.

The requirements to attain Brunei citizenship include passing tests in Malay culture, customs and language. Stateless permanent residents of Brunei are given International Certificates of Identity, which allow them to travel overseas. The majority of Brunei's Chinese are permanent residents, and many are stateless.

Petroleum wealth allows the Brunei Government to provide the population with one of Asia's finest health care systems. The Brunei Medical and Health Department introduced the region's first government "flying doctor service" in early 1965. Malaria has been eradicated, and cholera is virtually nonexistent. There are four general hospitals in Bandar Seri Begawan, Tutong, Kuala Belait and Bangar, and there are numerous health clinics throughout the country.

Education starts with preschool, followed by 6 years of primary education and up to 6 years of secondary education. Nine years of education are mandatory. Most of Brunei's college students attend universities and other institutions abroad, but approximately 2,542 study at the University of Brunei Darussalam. Opened in 1985, the university has a faculty of over 300 instructors and is located on a sprawling campus at Tungku, overlooking the South China Sea.

The official language is Malay, but English is widely understood and used in business. Other languages spoken are several Chinese dialects, Iban, and a number of native dialects. Islam is the official religion, but religious freedom is guaranteed under the constitution.

== Population ==
The UN estimates Brunei's total population 456,055 as of Tuesday, July 23, 2024

The CIA World Factbook estimates the population at 450,565 as of July 2018.

=== UN estimates ===
Year	Total population (thousands)	Population in age bracket		
Year	Total population (thousands)	aged 0–14	aged 15–64	aged 65+
1950	48	36.4%	58.7%	4.9%
1955	63	39.5%	56.1%	4.4%
1960	80	42.1%	53.8%	4.1%
1965	100	44.7%	51.4%	3.9%
1970	125	41.1%	55.0%	3.8%
1975	157	39.8%	56.3%	3.8%
1980	189	38.7%	58.4%	3.0%
1985	219	38.7%	58.3%	3.0%
1990	252	35.4%	61.8%	2.8%
1995	290	33.3%	63.7%	3.0%
2000	327	30.3%	66.7%	2.9%
2005	363	28.2%	68.6%	3.2%
2010	399	26.2%	70.2%	3.6%

=== Structure of the population ===
Population by Sex and Age Group (Census 20.VI.2011) (Census):

Age group	Male	Female	Total	%
Total	203 149	190 223	393 372	100
0-4	15 678	14 653	30 331	7.71
5-9	17 269	16 365	33 634	8.55
10-14	18 448	17 015	35 463	9.02
15-19	17 948	17 013	34 961	8.89
20-24	19 950	18 257	38 207	9.71
25-29	20 749	18 445	39 194	9.96
30-34	19 322	17 619	36 941	9.39
35-39	17 329	16 423	33 752	8.58
40-44	15 262	14 819	30 081	7.65
45-49	12 836	11 754	24 590	6.25
50-54	10 318	9 458	19 776	5.03
55-59	7 170	6 872	14 042	3.57
60-64	4 160	4 354	8 514	2.16
65-69	2 583	2 501	5 084	1.29
70-74	1 833	2 079	3 912	0.99
75-79	1 195	1 398	2 593	0.66
80-84	701	703	1 404	0.36
85+	398	495	893	0.23
Age group	Male	Female	Total	Percent
0-14	51 395	48 033	99 428	25.28
15-64	145 044	135 014	280 058	71.19
65+	6 710	7 176	13 886	3.53

Population Estimates by Sex and Age Group (01.VII.2016) (Source: 2016 Population and Housing Census Update.):

Age group	Male	Female	Total	%
Total	214 104	203 152	417 256	100
0–4	14 864	13 563	28 427	6.81
5–9	15 673	14 753	30 426	7.29
10–14	17 663	16 643	34 306	8.22
15–19	18 949	17 468	36 417	8.73
20–24	20 544	18 483	39 027	9.35
25–29	21 416	18 396	39 812	9.54
30–34	19 313	17 582	36 895	8.84
35–39	17 815	16 677	34 492	8.27
40–44	15 743	15 421	31 164	7.47
45–49	13 682	14 019	27 701	6.64
50–54	11 651	11 509	23 160	5.55
55–59	9 462	9 777	19 239	4.61
60–64	7 068	7 523	14 591	3.50
65-69	4 257	4 701	8 958	2.15
70-74	2 537	2 558	5 095	1.22
75-79	1 737	2 043	3 780	0.91
80-84	974	1 232	2 206	0.53
85-89	498	517	1 015	0.24
90-94	184	212	396	0.09
95-99	64	60	124	0.03
100+	10	15	25	0.01
Age group	Male	Female	Total	Percent
0–14	48 200	44 959	93 159	22.33
15–64	155 643	146 855	302 498	72.50
65+	10 261	11 338	21 599	5.18

Population by Sex and Age Group (Census 02.VIII.2021) (Provisional):

Age group	Male	Female	Total	%
Total	226 102	203 897	429 999	100
0–4	14 211	12 506	26 717	6.21
5–9	16 038	14 844	30 882	7.18
10–14	15 486	14 539	30 025	6.98
15–19	17 098	16 207	33 305	7.75
20–24	20 383	17 299	37 682	8.76
25–29	22 888	18 476	41 364	9.62
30–34	22 161	17 770	39 931	9.29
35–39	20 330	16 699	37 029	8.61
40–44	18 121	15 710	33 831	7.87
45–49	15 426	14 570	29 996	6.98
50–54	12 967	12 651	25 618	5.96
55–59	10 129	9 930	20 059	4.66
60–64	7 917	8 305	16 222	3.77
65-69	5 760	6 296	12 056	2.80
70-74	3 441	3 855	7 296	1.70
75-79	1 865	1 935	3 800	0.88
80-84	1 078	1 392	2 470	0.57
85-89	509	661	1 170	0.27
90-94	170	185	355	0.08
95-99	43	48	91	0.02
100+	81	19	100	0.02
Age group	Male	Female	Total	Percent
0–14	45 735	41 889	87 624	20.38
15–64	167 420	147 617	315 037	73.26
65+	12 947	14 391	27 338	6.36

=== Median age ===
total: 30.5 years
male: 30 years
female: 31 years (2018 est.)

=== Population growth rate ===
1.55% (2018 est.)

=== Net migration rate ===
2.3 migrant(s)/1,000 population (2018 est.)

=== Sex ratio ===
at birth: 1.05 male(s)/female
0–14 years: 1.06 male(s)/female
15–24 years: 0.99 male(s)/female
25–54 years: 0.92 male(s)/female
55–64 years: 1.04 male(s)/female
65 years and over: 0.95 male(s)/female
total population: 0.98 male(s)/female (2017 est.)

=== Urbanization ===
Urban population: 77.6% of total population (2018)
Rate of urbanization: 1.66% annual rate of change (2015-20 est.)

== Vital statistics ==
=== UN estimates ===
Data according to the United Nations' World Population Prospects.

Period	Live births per year	Deaths per year	Natural change per year	CBR^{1}	CDR^{1}	NC^{1}	TFR^{1}	IMR^{1}
1950-1955	3 000	1 000	2 000	49.6	13.5	37.3	7.00	90.2
1955-1960	3 000	1 000	2 000	43.5	10.6	37.1	6.38	68.8
1960-1965	4 000	1 000	3 000	41.9	8.7	34.0	6.56	52.1
1965-1970	4 000	1 000	3 000	35.1	7.1	29.6	5.59	39.1
1970-1975	5 000	1 000	4 000	37.4	6.3	29.2	5.87	29.3
1975-1980	6 000	1 000	5 000	34.4	5.2	25.5	4.71	21.9
1980-1985	6 000	1 000	5 000	29.9	4.4	26.3	3.92	16.4
1985-1990	7 000	1 000	6 000	29.8	3.9	23.6	3.72	12.2
1990-1995	8 000	1 000	7 000	28.1	3.5	25.0	3.28	9.1
1995-2000	7 000	1 000	6 000	23.9	3.1	22.2	2.60	6.8
2000-2005	8 000	1 000	7 000	21.9	3.0	20.8	2.28	5.1
2005-2010	8 000	1 000	6 000	20.1	3.1	16.5	2.11	4.8
^{1} CBR = crude birth rate (per 1000); CDR = crude death rate (per 1000); NC = natural change (per 1000); TFR = total fertility rate (number of children per woman); IMR = infant mortality rate per 1000 births

=== Registered births and deaths ===
Data according to the United Nations Statistics Division.

	Average population	Live births	Deaths	Natural change	Crude birth rate (per 1000)	Crude death rate (per 1000)	Natural change (per 1000)	TFR
1949	45,000	2,073	766	1,307	47.1	17.4	29.7	
1950	48,000	2,316	826	1,490	50.3	18.0	32.4	
1951	51,000	2,805	708	2,097	58.4	14.8	43.7	
1952	54,000	2,809	865	1,944	54.0	16.6	37.4	
1953	57,000	2,903	808	2,095	51.8	14.4	37.4	
1954	60,000	3,332	776	2,556	54.6	12.7	41.9	
1955	63,000	3,600	878	2,722	55.4	13.5	41.9	
1956	66,000	4,076	904	3,172	59.1	13.1	46.0	
1957	70,000	3,320	1,138	2,182	44.3	15.2	29.1	
1958	73,000	4,399	911	3,488	55.0	11.4	43.6	
1959	76,000	4,201	935	3,266	49.4	11.0	38.4	
1960	80,000	4,105	917	3,188	45.6	10.2	35.4	
1961	83,000	4,312	606	3,706	49.0	6.9	42.1	
1962	87,000	3,980	628	3,352	43.3	6.8	36.4	
1963	91,000	3,521	655	2,866	36.7	6.8	29.9	
1964	95,000	4,178	621	3,557	41.8	6.2	35.6	
1965	100,000	4,193	662	3,531	39.9	6.3	33.6	
1966	104,000	4,089	657	3,432	37.5	6.0	31.5	
1967	109,000	4,381	756	3,625	38.4	6.6	31.8	
1968	114,000	4,912	715	4,197	41.3	6.0	35.3	
1969	119,000	4,614	691	3,923	36.9	5.5	31.4	
1970	125,000	4,823	716	4,107	37.1	5.5	31.6	
1971	131,000	5,181	801	4,380	38.1	5.9	32.2	
1972	137,000	5,008	742	4,266	35.3	5.2	30.0	
1973	144,000	5,034	708	4,326	34.7	4.9	29.8	
1974	150,000	5,013	640	4,373	33.4	4.3	29.2	
1975	157,000	5,141	728	4,413	33.0	4.7	28.3	
1976	163,000	5,300	667	4,633	32.5	4.1	28.4	
1977	170,000	5,397	748	4,649	31.8	4.4	27.4	
1978	176,000	5,590	731	4,859	31.7	4.1	27.5	
1979	183,000	5,877	728	5,149	32.1	4.0	28.1	
1980	189,000	5,767	742	5,025	30.5	3.9	26.5	
1981	195,000	5,877	705	5,172	30.1	3.6	26.5	
1982	201,000	5,952	783	5,169	29.6	3.9	25.7	
1983	207,000	5,983	717	5,266	28.9	3.5	25.4	
1984	213,000	6,330	768	5,562	29.7	3.6	26.1	
1985	219,000	6,682	794	5,888	30.5	3.6	26.9	
1986	225,000	6,920	723	6,197	30.7	3.2	27.5	
1987	232,000	7,088	765	6,323	30.6	3.3	27.3	
1988	238,000	6,881	777	6,104	28.9	3.3	25.6	
1989	245,000	6,926	827	6,099	28.3	3.4	24.9	
1990	252,000	7,011	770	6,241	27.8	3.1	24.8	
1991	259,000	7,106	852	6,254	27.4	3.3	24.1	
1992	267,000	7,290	887	6,403	27.3	3.3	24.0	
1993	274,000	7,314	1,018	6,296	26.7	3.7	22.9	
1994	282,000	7,400	1,000	6,400	26.2	3.5	22.7	
1995	287,300	7,500	1,000	6,500	25.9	3.5	22.4	
1996	294,500	7,633	1,002	6,631	25.7	3.4	22.3	
1997	301,700	7,459	883	6,576	24.5	2.9	21.6	
1998	309,500	7,411	928	6,483	23.7	3.0	20.8	
1999	316,900	7,408	905	6,503	23.2	2.8	20.3	
2000	324,800	7,481	965	6,516	22.9	3.0	19.9	2.30
2001	332,844	7,363	1,014	6,349	22.0	3.0	19.0	2.20
2002	340,100	7,464	1,041	6,423	21.9	3.0	18.8	2.40
2003	346,400	7,047	1,010	6,037	20.2	2.9	17.3	2.30
2004	352,300	7,165	1,010	6,155	20.1	2.8	17.3	2.10
2005	358,500	6,933	1,072	5,861	19.1	3.0	16.1	2.00
2006	364,500	6,526	1,095	5,431	17.6	3.0	14.7	1.80
2007	370,000	6,314	1,174	5,140	16.7	3.1	13.6	1.90
2008	375,000	6,424	1,091	5,333	16.7	2.8	13.9	1.882
2009	380,100	6,625	1,171	5,454	17.4	3.1	14.3	1.919
2010	386,800	6,412	1,208	5,204	16.6	3.1	13.5	1.828
2011	393,372	6,724	1,235	5,489	17.1	3.1	14.0	1.910
2012	398,700	6,909	1,216	5,693	17.3	3.0	14.3	1.933
2013	403,300	6,680	1,398	5,282	16.4	3.4	13.0	1.857
2014	407,600	6,891	1,470	5,421	16.7	3.6	13.2	1.910
2015	412,400	6,699	1,547	5,152	16.1	3.7	12.3	1.847
2016	417,256	6,437	1,632	4,805	15.4	3.9	11.5	1.820
2017	426,400	6,452	1,696	4,756	15.1	4.0	11.1	1.797
2018	436,600	6,199	1,612	4,587	14.2	3.7	10.5	1.721
2019	451,000	6,178	1,760	4,418	13.7	3.9	9.8	1.699
2020	441,800	6,498	1,752	4,746	14.7	4.0	10.7	1.829
2021	440,715	6,751	1,865	4,886	15.3	4.2	11.1	1.906
2022	445,400	6,254	2,322	3,932	14.0	5.2	8.8	1.765
2023	450,500	6,290	2,003	4,287	14.0	4.4	9.7	1.764
2024	455,500	5,359	1,974	3,385	11.8	4.3	7.4	1.468
2025	458,600	5,391	2,001	3,390	11.8	4.4	7.4	1.496

=== Life expectancy at birth ===
total population: 75.52 years
male: 73.32 years
female: 77.83 years (2009 est.)

== Ethnic groups ==
Population of Brunei according to ethnic group 1947-2021
Ethnic group	census 1947		census 1960		census 1971		census 1981		census 1991		census 2001		census 2011		census 2021	
Ethnic group	Number	%	Number	%	Number	%	Number	%	Number	%	Number	%	Number	%	Number	%
Malay	16,742	41.2	45,135	53.8	89,267	65.5	125,717	65.2	174,319	66.9	222,101	66.7	258,446	65.7	297,016	67.4
Kedayan^{1}	16,742	41.2	4,291	5.1	89,267	65.5	125,717	65.2	174,319	66.9	222,101	66.7	258,446	65.7	297,016	67.4
Chinese	8,300	20.4	21,795	26.0	31,925	23.4	39,461	20.5	40,621	15.6	37,056	11.1	40,534	10.3	42,132	9.6
Dusun	^{2}		4,873	5.8	8,552	6.3	15,175	7.9	15,665	6.0	73,687	22.1	13,280	3.4	101,567	23.0
Iban	1,330	3.3	3,900	4.6	8,552	6.3	15,175	7.9	15,665	6.0	73,687	22.1	13,280	3.4	101,567	23.0
Melanau	2,517	6.2	318	0.4	8,552	6.3	15,175	7.9	15,665	6.0	73,687	22.1	13,280	3.4	101,567	23.0
Indian	11,768	28.9	3,565	4.3	2,162	1.6	5,919	3.1	29,877	11.5	73,687	22.1	81,112	20.6	101,567	23.0
Other	11,768	28.9	3,565	4.3	4,350	3.2	6,560	3.4	29,877	11.5	73,687	22.1	81,112	20.6	101,567	23.0
Total	40,657		83,877		136,256		192,832		260,482		332,844		393,372		440,715	
^{1} The Kedayan were only mentioned as a separate ethnic group in the 1960 census; they are probably included in the Malay in the other censuses.^{2} included in 'Others'

According to the 1991 census, Bruneian (Malay, also called Kedayan) were 67% of the population, Chinese were 16%, indigenous were 6%, and others (including Indians) were 12%. Indigenous groups include the Iban people, Murut (a branch of the Dayak people), the Dusun, and the Melanau.
According to the CIA World Factbook, in 2016, the Malay were 65.7%, Chinese were 10.3%, and others were 24%.

== Languages ==
Malay (official), English, Chinese.

== Religions ==
According to Brunei's official 2021 data:
Muslims (official): 82.1%
Christians: 6.7%
Buddhists: 6.3%
indigenous beliefs and non-religious, atheist or agnostic: 4.9%

== HIV/AIDS ==
Adult prevalence rate: less than 0.1% (2003 est.)
People living with HIV/AIDS: less than 200 (2003 est.)
Deaths: less than 200 (2003 est.)

== Nationality ==
Noun: Bruneian(s)
Adjective: Bruneian

== Literacy ==
Definition: age 15 and over can read and write
Total population: 96%
Male: 97.5%
Female: 94.5% (2015 est.)

== Education expenditures ==
4.4% of total GDP (2016)

== See also ==
- Ethnic Chinese in Brunei
