= Bintulu language =

Austronesian language spoken in Sarawak, Malaysia

Bintulu
- Vaie
- Native to: Malaysia
- Region: Sarawak
- Native speakers: (4,200 cited 1981)
- Language family: Austronesian: Malayo-Polynesian; North Bornean; North Sarawakan; Baram?; Bintulu

Language codes
- ISO 639-3: bny
- Glottolog: bint1246
- ELP: Bintulu

Bintulu or Vaie is an Austronesian language of Borneo. Robert Blust leaves it as an isolate within the North Sarawakan languages. Ethnologue notes that it might be closest to Baram within those languages.
