= Berawan language =

Austronesian language spoken in Sarawak, Malaysia

Berawan
- Region: Sarawak, Malaysia
- Native speakers: 3,600 (2010)
- Language family: Austronesian: Malayo-Polynesian; North Bornean; North Sarawakan; Berawan–Lower Baram; Berawan

Language codes
- ISO 639-3: lod – inclusive code (deprecated in 2008); Individual codes: zbc – Central zbe – East zbw – West
- Glottolog: bera1264

Berawan is an Austronesian language spoken in eastern Sarawak, Malaysia.

== Dialects ==
1. Lakiput
2. Narom
3. Lelak
4. Dali
5. Miri long teran
6. Belait
7. Tutong
8. Long Terawan
9. Long Tutoh
10. Mulu Caves

== Distribution ==
1. Baram (Tutoh-Tinjar)
2. Batu Bela (Sungai Merah / Lower Tutoh)
3. Long Terawan (Middle Tutoh)
4. Long Teru (Lower Tinjar)
5. Long Jegan (Middle Tinjar)
6. Long Teran
7. Long Tabing
8. Long Takong
9. Loagan Bunut National Park
10. Long Patan
11. Long Palo (Tutoh)
12. Long Kuk

== Reconstruction ==
Proto-Berawan is the reconstructed proto-language of all Berawan language varieties. Its phonology has been extensively reconstructed by Jürgen M. Burkhardt in 2014.

=== Sound changes from Proto-Malayo-Polynesian ===
Severe limitations on antepenult syllables

All preantepenult syllables were lost in Proto-Berawan: *kalapani > *ləpineʔ > metathesised *pəlineʔ 'swallow (bird)'. Following this stage, all vowels in antepenult syllables were neutralised into *ə: *tinaʔi > *tənaʔeʔ 'small intestines'.

Vowel changes in penult syllables

The vowel *i, when preceding a vowel, inserted a glide in between, followed by other developments (*-iy- > *-iyy- > *-əyy- > *-əjj-). Meanwhile, *ə largely did not change during Proto-Berawan stage, but it geminated the following consonant (*pənuq > *pənno 'full'). The only exceptions were in word-initial position, in two words changed early into *a (*əzan, *əmbaw > *acciən 'notched log ladder', *appiəw 'high'), while in two others simply deleted it (*əpat, *əsuŋ > *pat 'four', *coŋ 'rice mortar').

When following other consonants, *a remains, but when following voiced (*b, *β, *d, *z, *g) or palatal (*j, *ñ, *y) consonants, it became *i instead (*batu > *bittoh 'stone', *ia > *jiəh '(s)he/it'). The consonant *l did not block the raising (*balu > *billoh 'widow').

== Bibliography ==
- Burkhardt, Jürgen M. (2014). The Reconstruction of the Phonology of Proto-Berawan (Thesis). Johann Wolfgang von Goethe University.
