= Berawan–Lower Baram languages =

Austronesian language group in Borneo

Berawan – Lower Baram
- Baram–Tinjar
- Geographic distribution: Borneo
- Linguistic classification: Austronesian: Malayo-Polynesian; North Bornean; North Sarawakan; Berawan – Lower Baram
- Subdivisions: Berawan; Lower Baram

Language codes
- Glottolog: bera1263

The Berawan – Lower Baram languages are a group of half a dozen languages spoken in Borneo.

== Languages ==
- Berawan
- Lower Baram: Belait, Kiput, Lelak, Narom, Tutong
