= Belait language =

Austronesian language spoken in Brunei and Malaysia

Belait
- Lemeting, Metteng
- Native to: Belait, Tutong (Brunei), Sarawak (Malaysia)
- Region: Brunei, Malaysia
- Ethnicity: Belait people
- Native speakers: 700+ speakers in the 1990s to fewer than 200 speakers in modern day
- Language family: Austronesian: Malayo-Polynesian; North Bornean; North Sarawakan; Berawan–Lower Baram; Lower Baram; Kiput–Belait; Belait

Language codes
- ISO 639-3: beg
- Glottolog: bela1260
- ELP: Belait

Belait, or Lemeting, is a Malayo-Polynesian language of Brunei and neighbouring Malaysia. It is spoken by the Belait people who mainly reside in the Bruneian Belait District. There were estimated 700+ speakers in the 1990s to fewer than 200 speakers in 2026 due to lack of intergenerational transmission.

== Classification ==
Belait is related to the Miri, Kiput and Narum languages of Sarawak. It is considered part of the Lower Baram subgroup of North Sarawak languages.

== Dialects ==
There are four mutually-intelligible dialects of Belait. These are spoken in two main regions:

- In the villages of Kuala Balai and Labi
- In the Kiudang subdistrict of Tutong

Two distinct dialects of Belait – Metting and Bong – are spoken within the Mungkom village, Kiudang. There are very few speakers of any of the dialects.

== Phonology ==
General references on Belait phonology include Martin (1990) on Metteng Belait and Noor Alifah Abdullah (1992) on Labi Belait. This sketch is based on the Metteng dialect (Clynes 2005). Other dialects may vary in their phonology and lexicon.

=== Consonants ===
| | | Labial | Apical | Laminal | Dorsal | Glottal |
|---|---|---|---|---|---|---|
| Nasals | | m | n | ɲ | ŋ | |
| Plosives | voiceless | p | t | c | k | ʔ |
| Plosives | voiced | b | d | ɟ | g | ʔ |
| Fricatives | | | | s | ʁ | h |
| Laterals | | | l | | | |
| Glides | | w | | j | | |

=== Vowels ===
Metteng Belait has five monophthong vowels /i, u, e, o, a/. There is one diphthong /iə/.

The phoneme /e/ is realised as [ə] in non-final syllables, and as [ɛ] and [e] in final syllables.

=== Syllable structure ===
Lexical roots are disyllabic. Final syllables are typically (C)V((C)C). Non-final are typically ((C)C)V(C).

== Grammar ==
=== Word classes ===
The major word classes in Belait are verbs and nouns. The two classes can be distinguished by their distribution, form and function. For example, verbs are negated with the form (e)ndeh and nouns with the form kay':

pra'=yeh nga' salit, ndeh ana' umaw' padi
rain=DIST already be.hard, NEG able AV.make paddy
'The rain has become hard, [we] are not able to grow rice'

kad macim blabiw, kay' blabiw
tarsier like rat NEG rat
'The tarsier is like a rat, but it is not a rat'

There are also several closed functional classes:

- Pronouns
- Prepositions
- Classifiers
- Numerals
- Modals and aspectuals
- Deictics (including demonstratives)

=== Basic clause structure ===
Belait is head-initial. This means that head nouns precede possessors and other modifiers. They also precede relative clauses. Most clauses consist of a predicate and a subject. The subject can either follow or precede the predicate. Hence, word order is flexible.

pading=yeh lassaw'
sword=DIST hot
'The sword was hot'

nengngay'=nyeh pading=yeh lay' mi' dile'
UV.throw=3S sword=DIST to at sea
'He threw the sword into the sea'

Predicates can be Verb Phrases (VP), Noun Phrases (NP) or a Prepositional Phrase (PP). Non-subject arguments of a verbal predicate occur immediately after the verb.

==== Verbal predicates ====
The head of a verbal predicate is the verb. There are two main types of verbs in Belait: intransitive and transitive. Intransitive verbs only have a single subject argument. They do not have any voice morphology on the verb. In contrast, transitive verbs occur in two different voices: Actor Voice (AV) and Undergoer Voice (UV). The two constructions are illustrated below:

idih unnah kuman salang
people before AV.eat charcoal
'The people before [first ancestors of the Belait] ate charcoal'

brejin kinan=lew abey'
durian UV.eat=3P complete
'The durian was all eaten up by them'

In the AV construction in (5) the subject is the Actor, i.e. idih unnah 'the people before'. In the UV construction in (6) the subject in the Undergoer, i.e. brejin 'durian'. In both cases, the subject comes before the predicate. The undergoer voice typically has perfective semantics. The actor voice tends to be used in other contexts.
