= Punan Tubu language =

Language

Punan Tubu
- Native to: Indonesia
- Region: East Kalimantan
- Native speakers: (2,000 cited 1981)
- Language family: Austronesian: Malayo-Polynesian; Greater North Borneo; Central Sarawak; Punan–Müller-Schwaner; Punan; Punan Tubu

Language codes
- ISO 639-3: puj
- Glottolog: puna1266

Punan Tubu is one of several Punan languages of Indonesian Borneo.
