= Narom language =

Austronesian language spoken in Sarawak, Malaysia

Narom
- Bhasa Narom
- Region: Sarawak, Malaysia.
- Ethnicity: 4,000 (2012); 10,000 Miriek
- Language family: Austronesian: Malayo-Polynesian; North Bornean; North Sarawakan; Berawan–Lower Baram; Lower Baram; Lelak–Narom; Narom
- Dialects: Bakong; Daliʼ; Miriʼ

Language codes
- ISO 639-3: nrm
- Glottolog: naro1251

Narom language (sometimes spelled Narum) is a Malayo-Polynesian language of the Lower Baram branch. It is spoken by some 2,420 Narom people in Sarawak, Malaysia, and particularly in the Miri Division and the area south of Baram River mouth. The language has three dialects, Bakong, Daliʼ and Miriʼ.
