= Belait people =

Bruneian ethnic group

Belait
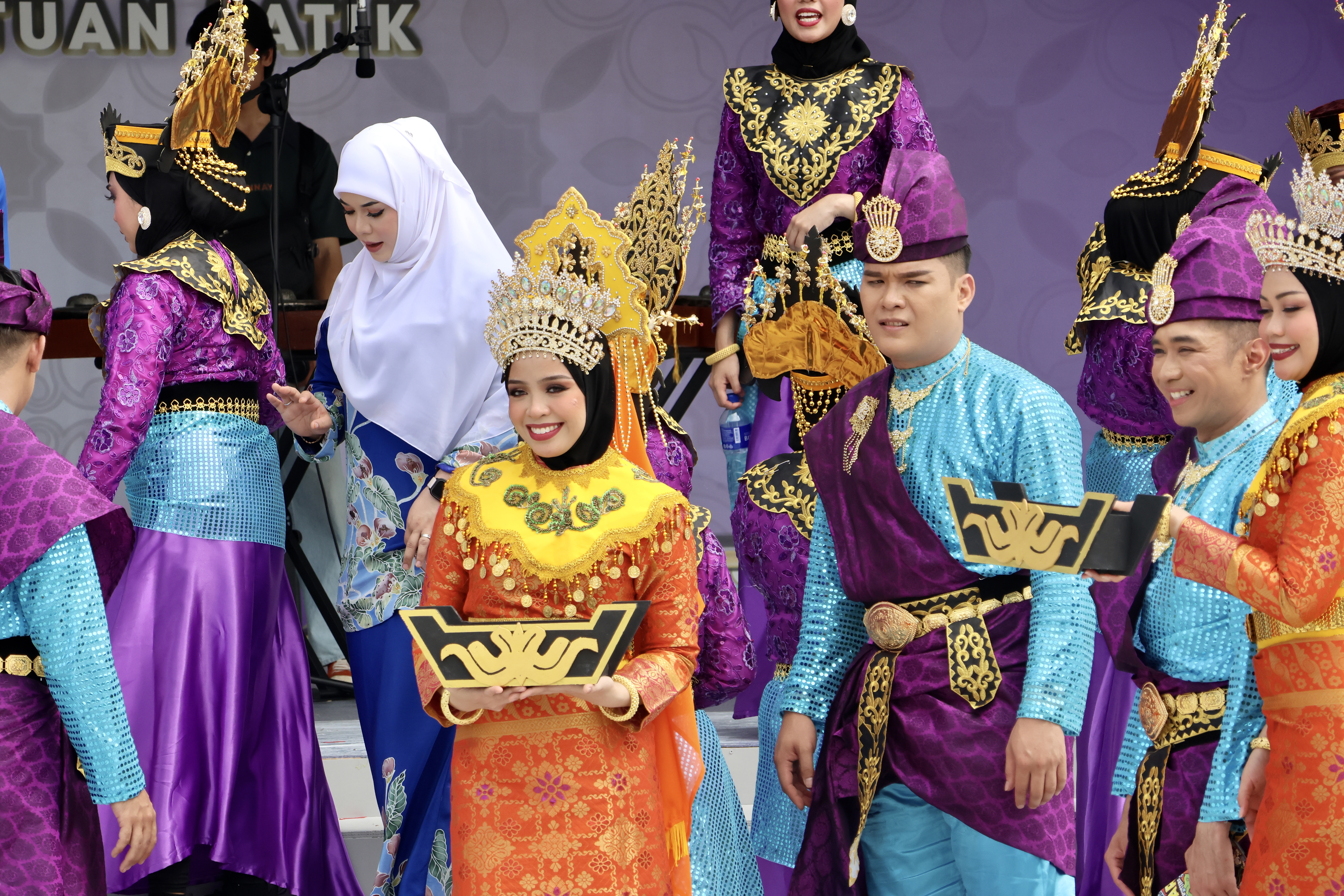
- People of Belait in 2023

Regions with significant populations
- Brunei

Languages
- Belait, Malay

Religion
- Islam

Related ethnic groups
- Kiput, Dali, Tutong, Miriek, Other Indigenous peoples of Brunei

The Belait people are a Bruneian ethnic group native to Belait District. They traditionally speak the Belait language. They are predominantly Muslim. They are officially one of the seven ethnic groups which make up the Bruneian Malay race.

== Origin ==
The Belait people originated from the merger between two ethnic groups, namely the Belait jati (i.e. the 'native' Belait) and the Lemeting or Meting. The latter was originally native to Tinjar River, a tributary of the Baram River in Sarawak, Malaysia; they later migrated to the area of, and eventually integrated with, the 'native' Belait.

== Language ==
The Belait language, the traditional language of the Belait people, is an Austronesian language within the sub-group Malayo-Polynesian. The language is considered "seriously" endangered; it is claimed that there are "almost no younger speakers".

== Notable people ==
- Kefli Razali (born 1940), naval officer
- Yusoff Abdul Hamid (born 1949), politician and diplomat
- Norsiah Abdul Gapar (born 1952), a recipient of the S.E.A. Write Award 2009
- Suyoi Osman (born 1952), politician and minister
- Mustappa Sirat (born 1957), a politician and minister
- Rozan Yunos (born 1963), a civil servant and writer
- Abu Sufian Ali (born 1966), diplomat
- Zulkhairy Razali (born 1996), footballer who plays striker for Indera SC
- Maizurah Abdul Rahim (born 1999), sprinter
- Abdul Hariz Herman (born 2000), footballer for MS ABDB
- Jefri Syafiq Ishak (born 2002), footballer for Kuala Belait FC
- Shari Ahmad, military officer
- Salleh Bostaman, businessman and politician
