= Brunei Malay =

Language spoken in parts of Borneo

- Bruneian Malay
- Bahasa Melayu Brunei بهاس ملايو بروني
- Native to: Brunei, Malaysia
- Region: Borneo
- Ethnicity: Bruneian Malay, Kedayan
- Native speakers: 320,000 (2013–2019)
- Language family: Austronesian: Malayo-Polynesian; Malayo-Sumbawan (?); Malayo-Chamic-BSS (?); Malayic; Brunei Malay
- Dialects: Brunei Malay (main); Kampong Ayer; Kedayan
- Writing system: Latin (Malay alphabet); Arabic (Jawi)

Language codes
- ISO 639-3: kxd
- Glottolog: brun1242
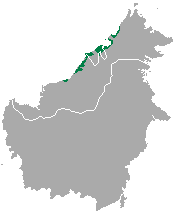
- Area where Brunei Malay is spoken

Brunei Malay, also called Bruneian Malay (Malay: Bahasa Melayu Brunei; Jawi: بهاس ملايو بروني), is the most widely spoken language in Brunei Darussalam and a lingua franca in some parts of Sarawak and Sabah, such as Labuan, Limbang, Lawas, Sipitang, Beaufort, Kuala Penyu and Papar. Though Standard Malay is promoted as the official national language of Brunei, Brunei Malay is socially dominant and it is currently replacing the minority languages of Brunei, including the Dusun and Tutong languages, existing in a diglossic speech, wherein Brunei Malay is commonly used for daily communication, coexisting with the aforementioned regional languages and Malay creoles, and standard Malay used in formal speech; code switching between standard Malay and Brunei Malay is spoken in informal speech as a lingua franca between Malay creoles and regional languages. It is quite similar to Standard Malay to the point of being almost mutually intelligible with it, being about 84% cognate with standard Malay. Standard Malay is usually spoken with Brunei pronunciation.

== Phonology ==
=== Consonants ===
The consonantal inventory of Brunei Malay is shown below:

		Bilabial	Alveolar	Palatal (-alveolar)	Velar	Glottal
Nasal		m	n	ɲ	ŋ	
Plosive/ Affricate	voiceless	p	t	tʃ	k	(ʔ)
Plosive/ Affricate	voiced	b	d	dʒ	ɡ	
Fricative	voiceless	(f)	s	(ʃ)	(x)	h
Fricative	voiced	(v)	(z)			
Approximant		w	l	j		
Vibrant			r			

Notes:

1. /t/ is dental in many varieties of Malay, but it is alveolar in Brunei.
2. /k/ is velar in initial position, but it is realised as uvular [q] in coda.
3. Parenthesised sounds occur only in loanwords.
4. All consonants can occur in word-initial position, except /h/. Therefore, Standard Malay hutan 'forest' became utan in Brunei Malay, and Standard Malay hitam 'black' became itam.
5. All consonants can occur in word-final position, except the palatals /tʃ, dʒ, ɲ/ and voiced plosives /b, d, ɡ/. Exceptions can be found in a few borrowed words such as mac 'March' and kabab 'kebab'.
6. Some analysts exclude /w/ and /j/ from this table because they are 'margin high vowels', while others include /w/ but exclude /j/.
7. /r/ is usually realized as a tap [ɾ] or trill [r] but may also be an approximant [ɹ].

=== Vowels ===
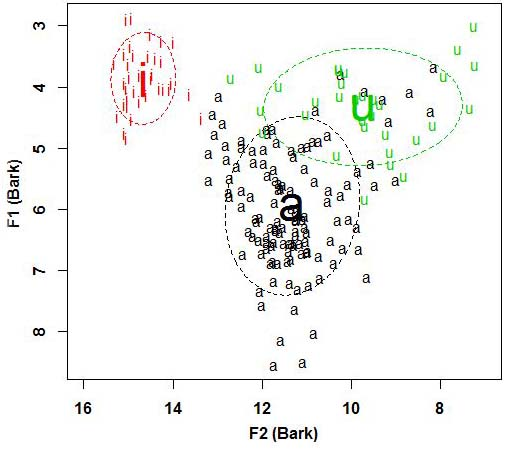
Acoustic analysis of the three vowels of Brunei Malay

	Front	Central	Back
Close	i		u
Open		a	

Brunei Malay has a three-vowel system: /a, i, u/. Acoustic variation in the realisation of these vowels is shown in the plot on the right, based on the reading of a short text by a single female speaker.

While /i/ is distinct from the other two vowels, there is substantial overlap between /a/ and /u/. This is partly because of the vowel in the first syllable of words such as maniup ('to blow') which can be realised as [ə]. Indeed, the Brunei Malay dictionary uses an 'e' for the prefix in this word, listing it as meniup, though other analyses prefer to show prefixes such as this with 'a', on the basis that Brunei Malay just has three vowel phonemes.

== Language use ==
Brunei Malay, Kedayan, and Kampong Ayer can be regarded as dialects of Malay. Brunei Malay is used by the numerically and politically dominant Brunei people, who traditionally lived on water, while Kedayan is used by the land-dwelling farmers, and the Kampong Ayer dialect is used by the inhabitants of the river north of the capital. It has been estimated that 94% of the words of Brunei Malay and Kedayan are lexically related.

Coluzzi studied the street signs in Bandar Seri Begawan, the capital city of Brunei Darussalam. The researcher concluded that except Chinese, "minority languages in Brunei have no visibility and play a very marginal role beyond the family and the small community."

== Vocabulary ==
Brunei Malay	Malaysian Malay	Meaning
Aku/ku		First person singular
Saya		First person singular
Peramba	Patik	First person singular when in conversation with a Royal Family Member
Awak		Second person singular
Kau		Second person singular
Ko		Second person singular
Awda	Anda	From (si) awang and (si) dayang. It is used like the Malay word anda.
Kamu		Second person plural
Ia	Dia	Third person singular
Kitani	Kita	First person plural (inclusive)
Kita		To be used either like kitani or biskita
Si awang	Beliau	Male third person singular
Si dayang	Beliau	Female third person singular
Biskita	Kita	To address a listener of older age. Also first person plural
Cinta	Tercinta	To address a loved one
Ani	Ini	This
Atu	Itu	That
(Di) mana?		Where (at)?
Ke mana?		Where to?
Lelaki		Male (human)
Laki-laki		Male (human)
Perempuan		Female (human)
Bini-bini (Note: In Malay, Bini-bini is exclusively used in Brunei to refer to a woman. In Indonesia, Malaysia and Singapore, it is an informal way to refer to one's wives or a group of married women.)		Female (human)
Budiman	Tuan/Encik	A gentleman
Kebawah Duli	Baginda	His Majesty
Awu		Yes
Ya		Yes
Inda		No
Tidak		No
kabat	Tutup	To close (a door, etc.)
Makan		To eat
Suka		To like
Cali	Lawak	Funny (adj.), derived from Charlie Chaplin
Siuk	Syok	cf. Malaysian syok, Singaporean shiok
Lakas	Lekas	To be quick, (in a) hurry(ing) (also an interjection)
Karang	Nanti	At a later time, soon
Tarus	Terus	Straight ahead; immediately
Manada	Mana ada	Used as a term when in a state denial (as in 'No way!' or 'It can't be')
Baiktah	Lebih baik	'Might as well ... '
Orang putih	Orang putih; Mat salleh	Generally refers to a white Westerner.
Kaling	Keling	Refers to a Bruneian of Indian descent. (This is generally regarded as pejorative.)

== Studies ==
The vocabulary of Brunei Malay has been collected and published by several western explorers in Borneo including Pigafetta in 1521, De Crespigny in 1872, Charles Hose in 1893, A. S. Haynes in 1900, Sidney H. Ray in 1913, H. B. Marshall in 1921, and G. T. MacBryan in 1922, and some Brunei Malay words are included in A Malay-English Dictionary by R. J. Wilkinson.

The language planning of Brunei has been studied by some scholars.
