= Kedayan =

Ethnic group in Borneo

Kedayan people Kadayan / Kadaian / Kadyan
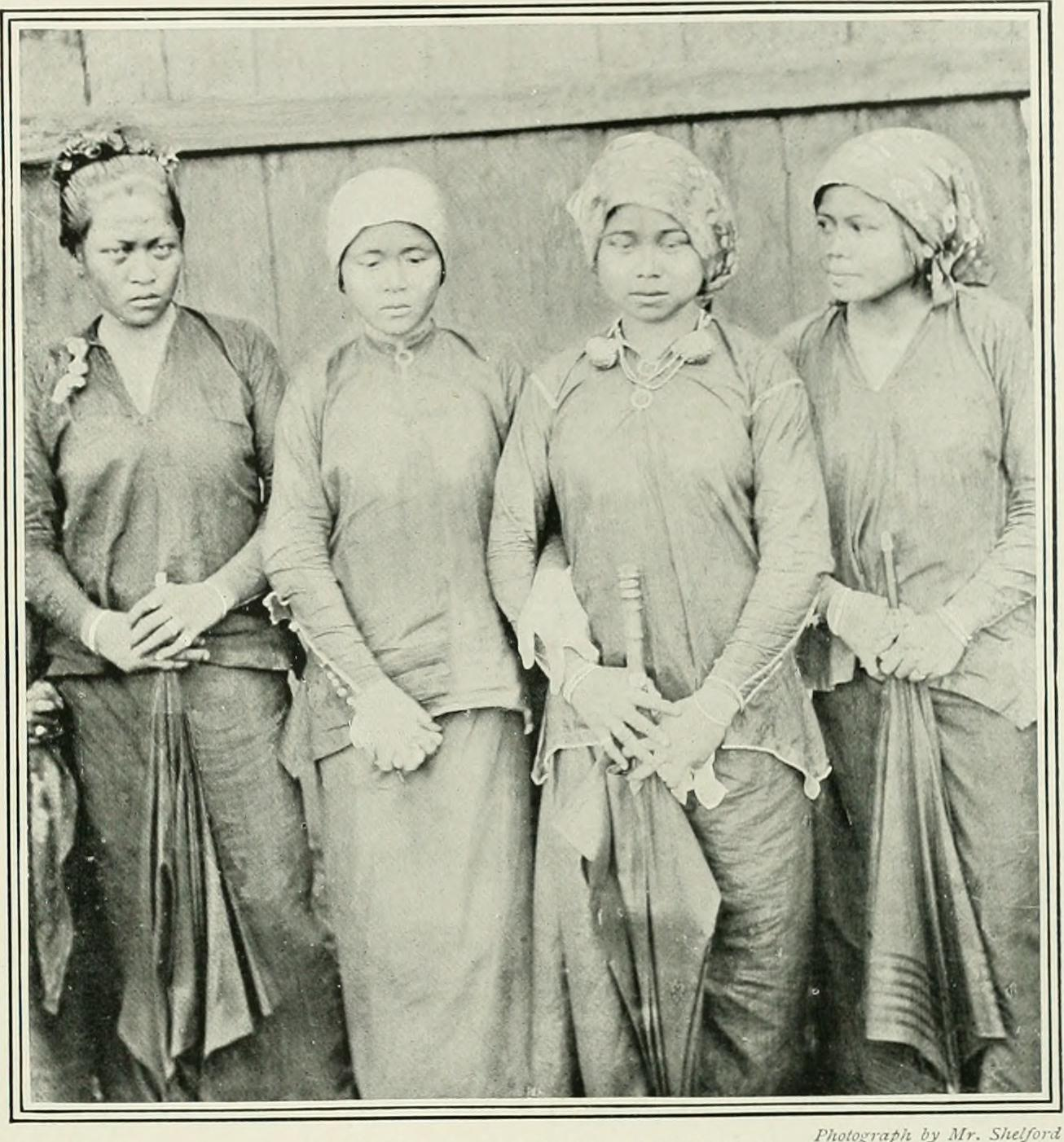
- Kadayan women, c. 1908. Note the light tunic with rows of buttons.

Total population
- est. 240,000 in Borneo

Regions with significant populations
- Borneo: Brunei; Malaysia (Sabah, Sarawak and the Federal Territory of Labuan)

Languages
- Kedayan and Sabah Malay, Sarawak Malay, Standard Malay and English

Religion
- Sunni Islam (majority)

Related ethnic groups
- Bruneian Malay, Dusun (Brunei), Banjarese, Javanese, Lun Bawang/Lundayeh, Other Indigenous peoples of Brunei

The Kedayan (also known as Kadayan, Kadaian or Kadyan) are an ethnic group residing in Brunei, Federal Territory of Labuan, southwest of Sabah, and north of Sarawak on the island of Borneo. According to the Language and Literature Bureau of Brunei, the Kedayan language (ISO 639-3: kxd) is spoken by about 30,000 people in Brunei, and it has been claimed that there are a further 46,500 speakers in Sabah and 37,000 in Sarawak. In Sabah, the Kedayan mainly live in the southern districts of Sipitang and Beaufort, where they are counted as a part of the local Malay populace (and they are often considered as Bruneians owing to assimilation as well as mixed marriage factors). Whilst in Sarawak, the Kedayans mostly reside in the towns of Lawas, Limbang and Miri (especially the Subis area).

== History ==
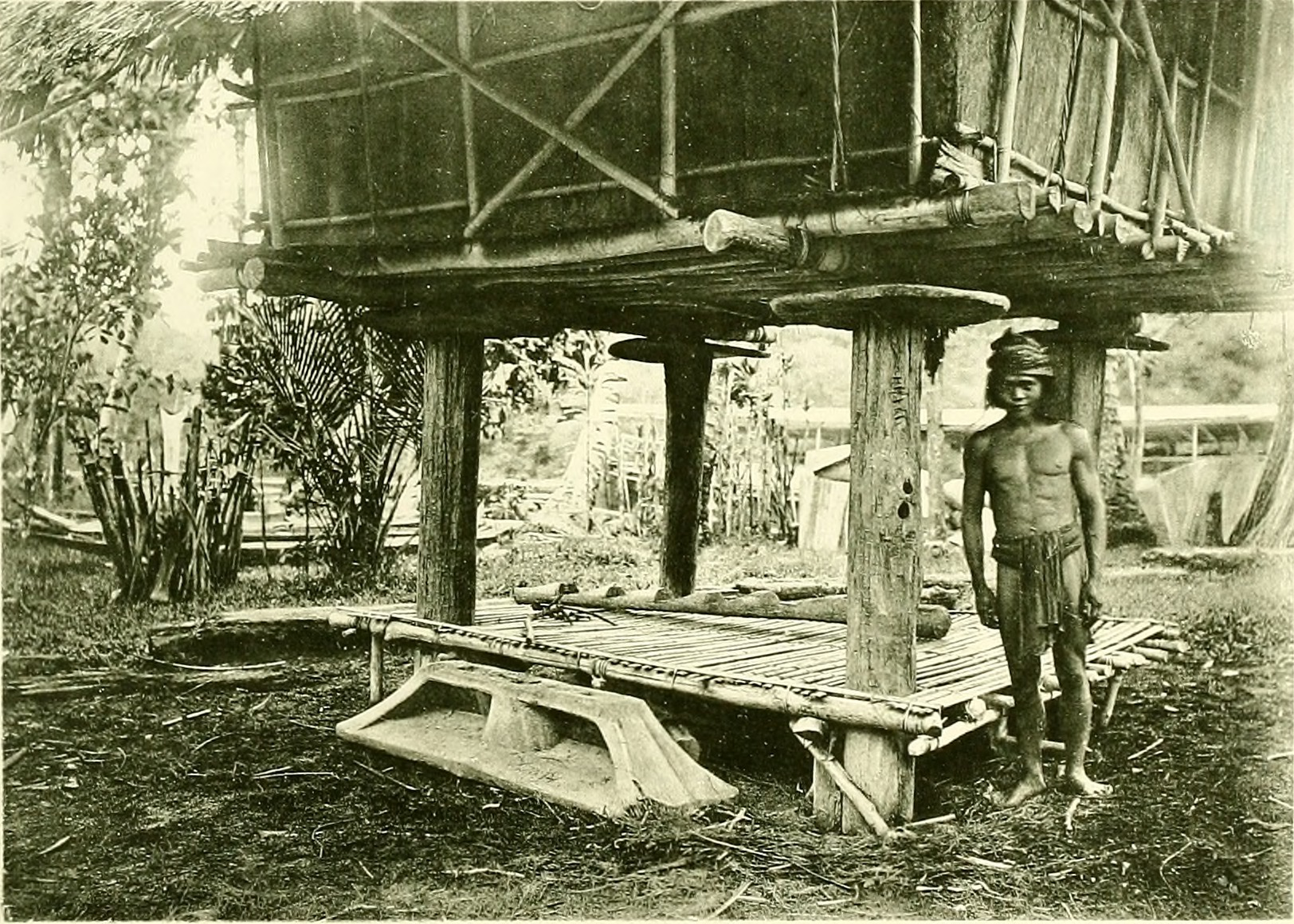
A Kedayan man, standing underneath a rice barn.

The origins of the Kedayans are uncertain. Some of them believe their people were originally from Java island, which they left during the reign of Sultan Bolkiah. Because of his fame as a sea captain and voyager, the Sultan was well-known to the people of Java, Sumatra and the Philippines, It is believed that when the Sultan arrived to the island of Java, he became interested in the local agricultural techniques. He brought some of the Javanese farmers back to his country to spread their techniques. The farmers inter-married with the local Bruneian Malay people, giving birth to the Kedayan ethnicity. Most Kedayans have adopted Islam since the Islamic era of the Sultanate of Brunei. They have also adopted Malay culture. The Kedayans are recognised as one of the indigenous people of Borneo. They are experts in making traditional medicines and various spiritual healings. The Kedayans are well known for their cultivation of medicinal plants, which they grow to treat a wide range of ailments and to make tonics.

== Language ==
The Kedayan language is similar to Brunei Malay, and it has been claimed that as many as 94% of the words in the two languages are cognate. The main differences in pronunciation are that Kedayan has initial /h/ while Brunei Malay does not, so Kedayan hutan (forest) is utan in Brunei Malay; and Kedayan does not have /r/, so Malay rumah (house) is umah in Kedayan.

The language of one of the indigenous tribes, the Banjar people in Kutai, East Kalimantan, Indonesia, is said to share more than 90% of the vocabulary with the Kedayan language, with the Banjarese separated from both the Brunei Malay and Kedayan for 400 years with similar adherence to Islam. Both the Kedayans and the Banjarese are related, to a certain extent, because of the similarities in their languages.

== Notable people ==
=== Brunei ===
- Muslim Burut – Bruneian writer.

=== Sabah ===
- Sapawi Ahmad – former Malaysian federal representative for Sipitang constituency.
- Dr. Yusof Yacob – former Sabah state minister and Malaysian federal representative for Sipitang constituency.
- The late Pengiran Ahmad Raffae (1907–1995) – the second of Governor of Sabah (also of mixed Bruneian descent).
- Sr. Safar Untong – Sabah State Secretary from 2019 to 2025, former Sabah Lands and Surveys Department director from 2014 to 2019.
- Noki K-Clique – Sabahan famous hip-hop rapper, also of partial Orang Sungei descent through mother.
- Datuk Prof Dr Rossita Shapawi - Deputy Vice Chancellor of University Malaysia Sabah (Academic and International Affairs)
- Dr Ferro Firdaus Ibrahim - Director of Hospital Queen Elizabeth 2

=== Labuan ===
- Bashir Alias – Malaysian senator for Labuan.
- Rozman Isli – former Malaysian member of parliament for Labuan from 2013 to 2022.
- Yussof Mahal – former Malaysian member of parliament for Labuan from 2008 to 2013.

=== Sarawak ===
- Awang Tengah Ali Hasan – Deputy Premier of Sarawak.
- Ahmad Lai Bujang – former Malaysian federal representative for the Sibuti constituency.
- Rosey Yunus – State Deputy Minister of Welfare, Women, Family Community Wellbeing and Childhood Development of Sarawak.

=== Australia ===
- Omar Musa – Malaysian-Australian author, poet, rapper and visual artist.
