= Tutong language =

Austronesian language spoken in Brunei

Tutong
- Tutong 2
- Region: Brunei
- Native speakers: 17,000 (2006)
- Language family: Austronesian: Malayo-Polynesian; North Bornean; North Sarawakan; Berawan–Lower Baram; Lower Baram; Kiput–Belait; Tutong

Language codes
- ISO 639-3: ttg
- Glottolog: tuto1241

The Tutong language, also known as Basa Tutong, is a language spoken by approximately 17,000 people in Brunei. It is the main language of the Tutong people, the majority ethnic group in the Tutong District of Brunei.

== Classification ==
Tutong is an Austronesian language and belongs to the Rejang–Baram group of languages spoken in Brunei as well as Kalimantan, Indonesia, and Sarawak, Malaysia. Tutong is related to the Belait language with roughly 54% of basic vocabulary being cognate.

== Language use ==
Today, many speakers of Tutong are shifting away from the traditional language and code-mix or code-shift with Brunei Malay, Standard Malay and English. The language has been given a vitality rating of 2.5 based on a scale of 0–6 that uses the measures of the rate of transmission to future generations, the level of official support, and the geographical concentration of speakers. This means it is considered endangered.

Nonetheless, there is interest in revitalising the language. Since 2012, a module has been taught in Tutong at Universiti Brunei Darussalam. Similarly, the Dewan Bahasa dan Pustaka (Brunei's language agency) published a Tutong–Malay, Malay–Tutong dictionary in 1991 and a word list of several Brunei languages in 2011.

== Phonology ==
=== Vowels ===
	Front	Central	Back
Close	i		u
Mid	ɛ	(ə)	ɔ
Open		a aː	

- Vowels /i, ɛ, a, u/ are heard as [e, ə, ʌ, o] in lax positions.
- /ɛ, a/ can also be freely heard as [ə, ʌ] in syllable-initial positions.

=== Consonants ===
		Labial	Alveolar	Palatal	Velar	Glottal
Nasal		m	n	ɲ	ŋ	
Plosive/ Affricate	voiceless	p	t	tʃ	k	ʔ
Plosive/ Affricate	voiced	b	d	dʒ	ɡ	
Fricative			s		ɣ	
Lateral			l			
Approximant		w		j		

- Sounds /p, k, m/ may also be geminated as [pː, kː, mː].
- Other sounds /z, ʃ, x, h/ may occur from loanwords.

== Resources ==
- Haji Ramlee Tunggal (2005). Struktur Bahasa Tutong [Tutong Language Structure] (in Malay). Bandar Seri Begawan: Dewan Bahasa dan Pustaka Brunei.
- Noor Azam Haji-Othman (2005). Linguistic Diversity in Negara Brunei Darussalam: An Ecological Perspective (PhD thesis). University of Leicester. hdl:2381/30897.
