= North Sarawakan languages =

Subgroup of the Austronesian language family

North Sarawakan
- Geographic distribution: Brunei, Indonesia (East Kalimantan, North Kalimantan), Malaysia (Sarawak)
- Linguistic classification: Austronesian: Malayo-Polynesian; North Bornean; North Sarawakan
- Subdivisions: Kenyah; Dayic; Berawan–Lower Baram; Bintulu; ? Punan Tubu

Language codes
- Glottolog: nort3171

The North Sarawakan languages are a group of Austronesian languages spoken in parts of the sovereign state of Brunei; the Indonesian provinces of East Kalimantan and North Kalimantan; and the Malaysian state of Sarawak (hence the name). This branch was proposed in Blust (1991, 2010).

North Sarawakan languages

- Kenyah
- Dayic languages (Apo Duat)
- Berawan–Lower Baram
- Bintulu

Ethnologue 16 adds Punan Tubu as an additional branch, and notes that Bintulu might be closest to Baram. The Melanau–Kajang languages were removed in Blust 2010.

The Northern Sarawak languages are well known for strange phonological histories.

== Classification ==
Smith (2017) classifies the North Sarawakan languages as follows.

- Bintulu
- Berawan–Lower Baram
  - Berawan (various dialects)
  - Lower Baram (Miri, Kiput, Narum, Belait, Lelak, Lemeting, Dali')
- Dayic
  - Kelabit (Bario, Pa' Dalih, Tring, Sa’ban, Long Seridan, Long Napir)
  - Lun Dayeh (Long Bawan, Long Semadoh)
- Kenyah
  - Highland (Lepo' Gah, Lepo' Tau, Lepo' Sawa, Lepo', Lepo' Laang, Badeng, Lepo' Jalan, Uma' Baha, Uma' Bem, Òma Lóngh)
  - Lowland
    - Eastern Lowland (Uma' Pawe, Uma' Timai, Lebo' Kulit)
    - Western Lowland (Lebo’Vo', Sebop, Penan (eastern and western varieties))
