= Brunei Darussalam–Indonesia–Malaysia–Philippines East ASEAN Growth Area =

Southeast Asian cooperation initiative

- Logo
- Type: Subregional economic co-operation
- Members: 4 Countries: Brunei Darussalam; Indonesia; Malaysia; Philippines
- Establishment: 24 March 1994

Area
  - Total: 1,600,000 km^{2} (620,000 sq mi)
- GDP (PPP): 2020 estimate
  - Total: $322.8 billion
- Website https://bimp-eaga.asia/

The Brunei Darussalam–Indonesia–Malaysia–Philippines East ASEAN Growth Area (BIMP-EAGA) is a cooperation initiative established in 1994 to spur development in remote and less developed areas in the four participating Southeast Asian countries.

It is home to ecologically important areas. The Heart of Borneo, which straddles Indonesia, Malaysia, and parts of Brunei, is the largest contiguous forest area remaining in Southeast Asia. The Sulu–Sulawesi Seas is a highly biodiverse, globally significant biogeographic unit in the Coral Triangle—the center of the world's highest concentration of marine biodiversity.

== Background ==
Launched on March 24, 1994 in Davao City, BIMP-EAGA was formed by Brunei Darussalam, Indonesia, Malaysia and the Philippines to generate balanced and inclusive growth. As a sub-region of the Association of Southeast Asian Nations, it aims to contribute to regional economic integration in the ASEAN Economic Community.

BIMP-EAGA is an intergovernmental economic cooperation program that is envisioned to promote private sector-led and market-driven growth. The governments address the basic problems of the growth area, such as lack of adequate transport, power, and ICT infrastructure, to pave the way for private sector investments and activities. They fill the infrastructure gaps, provide the policy and regulatory environment for public-private partnerships in relevant projects, and resolve such issues as transport facilitation, cross-border trade facilitation, elimination of non-tariff barriers and measures, and streamlining of customs, immigration, quarantine, and security rules, regulations and procedures.

== Geography ==
The sub-region covers the entire sultanate of Brunei Darussalam; the provinces of Kalimantan, Sulawesi, Maluku and West Papua of Indonesia; the states of Sabah and Sarawak and the federal territory of Labuan in Malaysia; and the island of Mindanao and the province of Palawan in the Philippines. These areas are geographically far from the national capitals, yet strategically close to each other. These states and provinces account for over 60% of the land area of the BIMP-EAGA countries; yet they make up less than 20% of their population and 18% of the labor force.

== Vision 2025 ==
BIMP-EAGA's Vision 2025, prepared with support from the Asian Development Bank, provides a way forward for members to continue narrowing development gaps, for sustainably managing natural resources, and for promoting stronger connectivity.

It focuses on three main outcomes:

- Developing a competitive and “green” manufacturing sector that can add value to production.
- Creating sustainable, competitive and climate-resilient agriculture and fishing industries.
- Adopting a multi-country approach to tourism that benefits less developed areas.

Its five strategic pillars are to (1) enhance connectivity, (2) establish the sub-region as Asia's food basket, (3) promote BIMP-EAGA as a premier tourism destination, (4) sustainably manage natural resources, and (5) promote people-to-people connectivity.

Key sectors are transport, trade and investment facilitation, energy, information and communication technology, agriculture and fisheries, tourism, environment, and sociocultural and education sector.

Under Vision 2025, BIMP-EAGA's rolling pipeline of priority infrastructure projects (PIPs) has increased by 65% to 88 (2021) from 57 (2017), with a combined value of $24.23 billion.

== Structure ==
BIMP-EAGA has an institutional structure that facilitates consultations and dialogue between and among the member countries at both national and sub-regional levels.

The BIMP-EAGA Leaders’ Summit, Ministerial Meeting, and Senior Officials’ Meeting provide the overall policies and strategic directions. These are supported by the national secretariats and the BIMP-EAGA Facilitation Center (BIMP-FC), which serves as the sub-regional secretariat.

Clusters and working groups are the operating units that support the strategic pillars by translating the strategic thrusts of each sector into projects.

The BIMP-EAGA Business Council (BEBC) represents the private sector in BIMP-EAGA. It enjoys a “fifth country” status at Senior Officials Meetings, with its chairman having the same rank as other senior officials during policy discussions.

The Asian Development Bank serves as the BIMP-EAGA Regional Development Advisor.

14th BIMP-EAGA Summit

His Majesty Sultan Haji Hassanal Bolkiah, Sultan and Yang Di-Pertuan of Brunei Darussalam, Indonesian President Joko Widodo, Malaysian Prime Minister Ismail Sabri Yaakob, and Philippine President Rodrigo Duterte gathered for the 14th BIMP-EAGA Summit, which was held on 28 October 2021 virtually because of the COVID-19 pandemic.

== Selected urban centres ==
Brunei

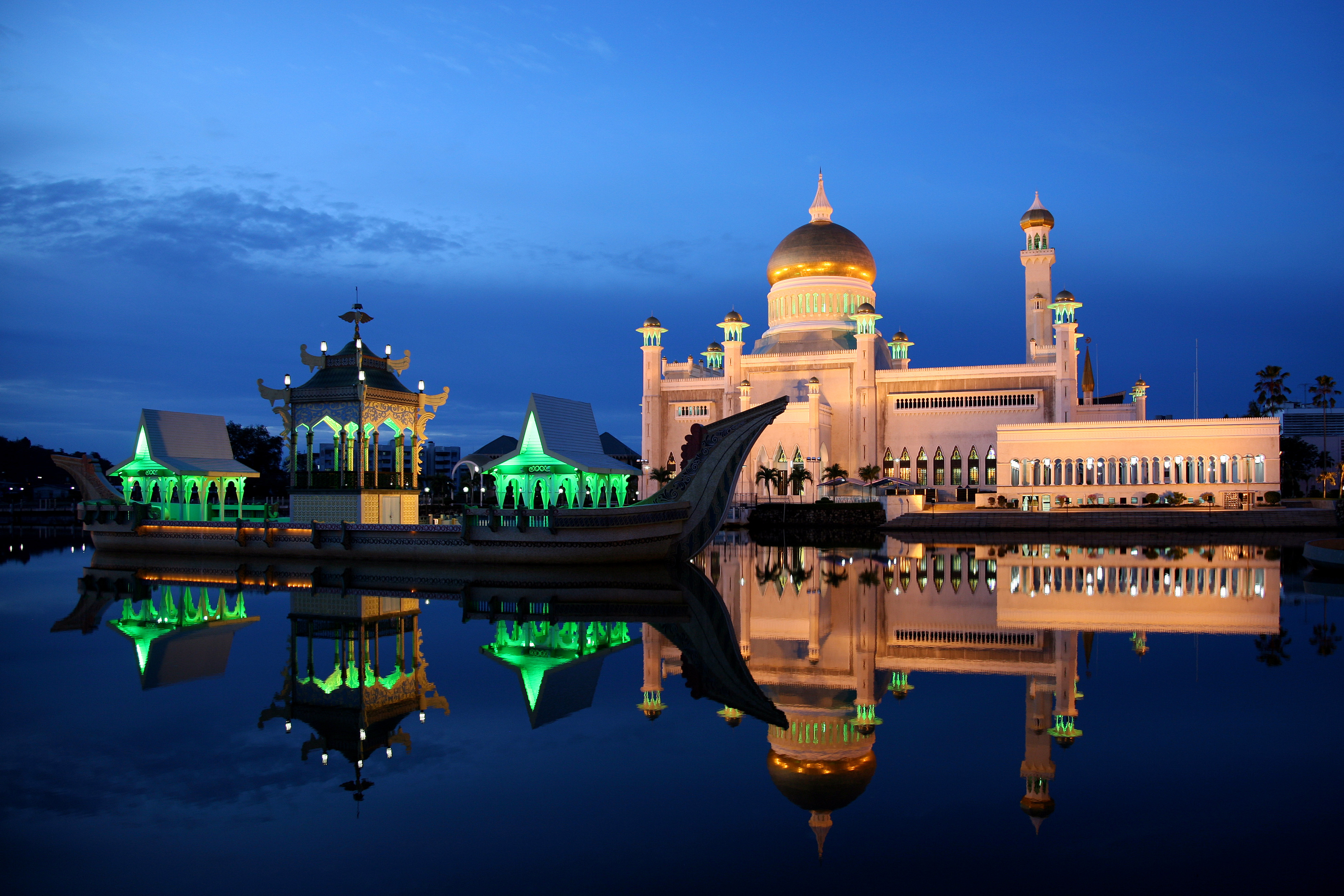
Sultan Omar Ali Saifuddin Mosque in Bandar Seri Begawan.

- Bandar Seri Begawan

Indonesia

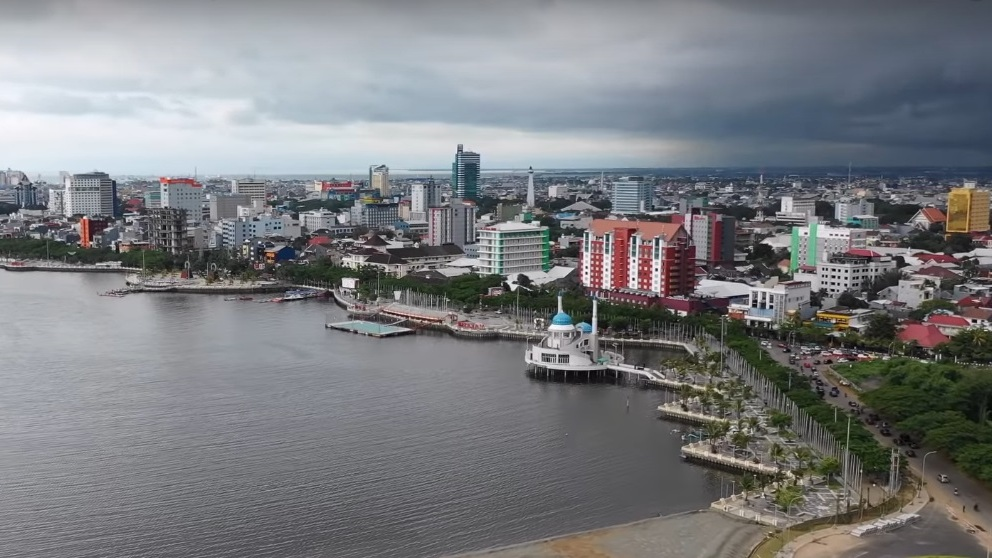
Makassar skyline

- Kalimantan :
  - Balikpapan, Banjarmasin, Pontianak, Samarinda
- Sulawesi :
  - Bitung, Makassar, Manado, Pare-Pare
- North Maluku :
  - Ternate
- Papua :
  - Jayapura, Manokwari

Malaysia

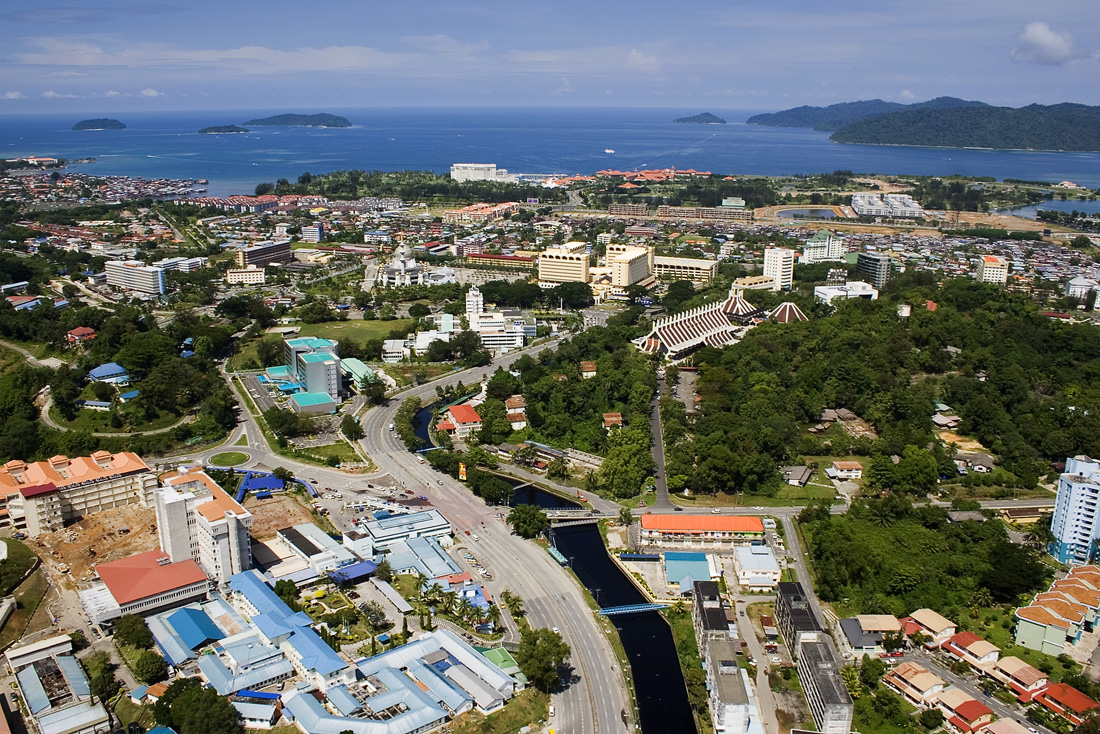
A bird's eye view of Kota Kinabalu from Penampang.

- Sabah :
  - Kota Kinabalu, Lahad Datu, Sandakan, Tawau
- Sarawak :
  - Bintulu, Kuching, Miri, Sibu
- Labuan

Philippines

- Mindanao :
  - Cotabato City, Davao City, General Santos, Zamboanga City
- Palawan :
  - Puerto Princesa

== 20 largest cities in BIMP EAGA by population ==
- Provincial/state capital
- National capital

Rank	City	Population	Country	Province/state/district
1	Davao City	1,848,947	Philippines	Davao del Sur
2	Makassar	1,474,393	Indonesia	South Sulawesi
3	Zamboanga City	977,234	Philippines	Zamboanga del Sur
4	Samarinda	861,878	Indonesia	East Kalimantan
5	Balikpapan	738,532	Indonesia	East Kalimantan
6	General Santos	697,315	Philippines	South Cotabato
7	Pontianak	679,818	Indonesia	West Kalimantan
8	Banjarmasin	678,243	Indonesia	South Kalimantan
9	Kota Kinabalu	500,425	Malaysia	Sabah
10	Nusantara	488,409	Indonesia	Nusantara
11	Manado	458,582	Indonesia	North Sulawesi
12	Sandakan	439,050	Malaysia	Sabah
13	Tawau	420,806	Malaysia	Sabah
14	Jayapura	414,862	Indonesia	Papua
15	Kuching	402,738	Malaysia	Sarawak
16	Palu	387,493	Indonesia	Central Sulawesi
17	Miri	356,900	Malaysia	Sarawak
18	Ambon	354,052	Indonesia	Maluku
19	Kendari	351,085	Indonesia	Southeast Sulawesi
20	Cotabato City	325,079	Philippines	Maguindanao del Norte

== Transport connectivity ==
To become fully integrated, BIMP-EAGA needs an efficient and secure transport network that seamlessly moves goods and people within and across borders. Interconnecting the subregion by land, air, and water also opens livelihood opportunities in rural communities and improve their access to services.

There has been significant progress in enhancing connectivity in the subregion with transport agreements signed since 2007. However, much still needs to be done to create a seamless and safe multimodal transport network.

== Selected sources ==
- BIMP-EAGA Vision 2025. https://bimp-eaga.asia/documents-and-publications/bimp-eaga-vision-2025
- Joint Statement from the 14th BIMP-EAGA Summit. https://bimp-eaga.asia/documents-and-publications/joint-statement-14th-bimp-eaga-summit
- BIMP-EAGA Integration: Issues and Challenges, Association of Development Research and Training Institutes of Asia and the Pacific (1997) ISBN 978-967-9910-47-6
- Asian Economic Cooperation and Integration: Progress, Prospects and Challenges, Asian Development Bank (2005) ISBN 971-561-549-X

== See also ==
- BIMP-EAGA Friendship Games
