= Telephone numbers in Brunei =

- Country: Brunei
- Continent: Asia
- Numbering plan type: closed
- Country code: +673
- International access: 00
- Long-distance: n/a (0 removed as of 22 March 2003)

Telephone numbers in Brunei consist of seven digits. Previously, the country used area codes consisting of '0' and a single digit, followed by the subscriber's number; for example, 02 for Bandar Seri Begawan, 03 for Seria and Kuala Belait, 04 for Tutong and 05 for Temburong.

== Number allocations ==
National Numbering Plan (NNP) for Brunei Darussalam (as of 6 November 2008):

LIST OF ALLOCATIONS
Service	Numbering
Fixed	+673 20X XXXX +673 21X XXXX +673 221 XXXX +673 222 XXXX +673 223 XXXX +673 224 XXXX +673 225 XXXX +673 226 XXXX +673 227 XXXX +673 23X XXXX +673 24X XXXX +673 25X XXXX +673 26X XXXX +673 27X XXXX +673 28X XXXX +673 29X XXXX +673 3XX XXXX +673 4XX XXXX +673 5XX XXXX
Mobile	+673 7XX XXXX +673 8XX XXXX +673 228 XXXX +673 229 XXXX
