= Geography of Brunei =

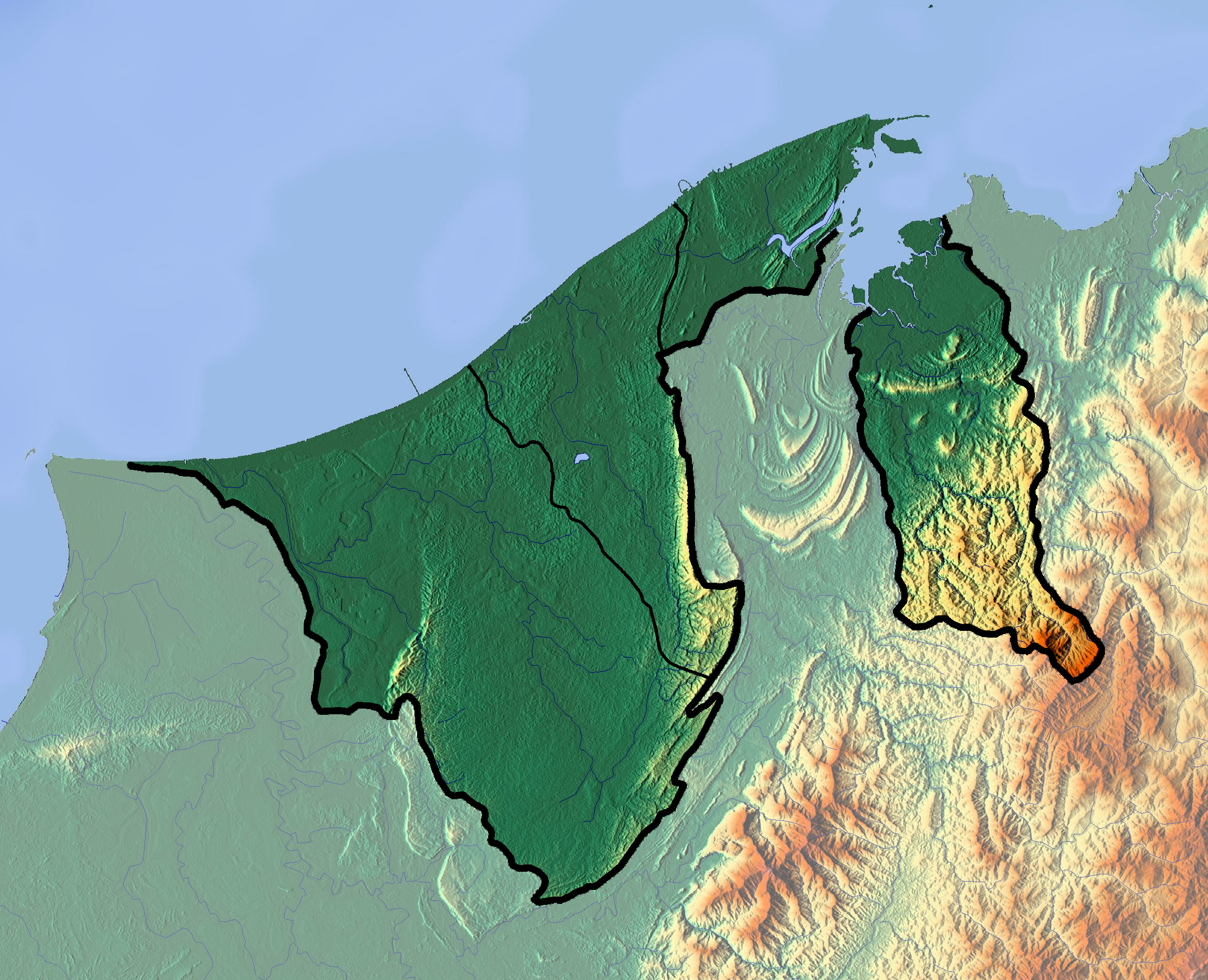
- Continent: Southeast Asia
- Region: Asia
- Coordinates: 4°30′N 114°40′E
- Area: Ranked 163rd
  - Total: 5,765 km^{2} (2,226 sq mi)
  - Land: 91.33%
  - Water: 8.67%
- Coastline: 266 km (165 mi)
- Borders: Malaysia
- Highest point: Bukit Pagon; 1,850 metres (6,070 ft)
- Lowest point: South China Sea; 0 metres (0 ft)
- Longest river: Belait River; 32 km (20 mi)
- Largest lake: Tasek Merimbun; 7,800 ha (19,000 acres)
- Exclusive economic zone: 10,090 km^{2} (3,900 mi^{2})

Brunei is a country in Southeast Asia, bordering the South China Sea and East Malaysia. Its geographical coordinates are 4°30′N 114°40′E. The country is small with a total size of 5,765 km^{2} (2,226 mi^{2}). It is larger in size than Trinidad and Tobago. It is close to vital sea lanes through the South China Sea linking the Indian and Pacific Oceans. The country has two parts physically separated by state of Sarawak, making it almost an enclave within Malaysia.

Brunei shares a 266 km (165 mi) border with Malaysia, and has a 161 km (100 mi) coastline. The terrain is a flat coastal plain that rises to mountainous in the east and hilly lowlands in the west. While earthquakes are quite rare, Brunei is located near the Pacific Ring of Fire.

== Climate ==
A tropical climate with high humidity prevails in Brunei. Typically, the entire nation experiences the same climate. The entire year is hot in the country. The monsoon winds and other wind systems in the area brought on by the distribution of air pressure in Southeast Asia, as well as the location on Borneo's northwest coast, which lies in the equatorial tropics, all have an impact on the climate. ITCZ (Intertropical Convergence Zone) is the name given to the low pressure trough that occurs around the equator. Areas in the subtropics on both hemispheres, however, experience high pressure, resulting in a pressure difference. This is due to air masses from the southern and northern hemispheres meet in this region, causing major climate shifts, the Intertropical Convergence Zone is crucial.

It's vital that the ITCZ's position typically oscillates based on the sun's zenithal position and is not always fixed. The magnitude of the latitudinal oscillation is reduced to roughly half that of the sun because of the movement's two-month delay. There are two distinct seasons in the nation that are separated by two transitional phases as a result of the ITCZ's shifting location throughout the year and the associated trade winds. The South China Sea and Borneo are substantially impacted by northeast monsoon winds that recurve via the Inter-Tropical Convergence zone to become northwesterly winds that blow across Indonesia between December and March. The ITCZ's typical location is between latitudes 50S and 100S when it migrated south across Brunei and Borneo in late December, a time period known as the Northeast Monsoon.

In Brunei forest cover is around 72% of the total land area, equivalent to 380,000 hectares (ha) of forest in 2020, down from 413,000 hectares (ha) in 1990. In 2020, naturally regenerating forest covered 374,740 hectares (ha) and planted forest covered 5,260 hectares (ha). Of the naturally regenerating forest 69% was reported to be primary forest (consisting of native tree species with no clearly visible indications of human activity) and around 5% of the forest area was found within protected areas. For the year 2015, 100% of the forest area was reported to be under public ownership.

The Inter-Tropical Convergence Zone, which is positioned east of the Philippines around latitude 150N between June and September, transforms into a monsoon trough to the west. The Southwest Monsoon is created by southeast trade winds that originate in the southern hemisphere and recurve on the equator. The northeast monsoon dominates from December to March whereas the southwest monsoon blows from May to September. Transitional months are recognized as April, October, and November.

The municipality of Bandar Seri Begawan's climate is tropical equatorial with two seasons. Dry season is extremely hot (24 to 36 °C or 75.2 to 96.8 °F). Wet or rainy season is generally warm and wet (20 to 28 °C or 68.0 to 82.4 °F). Most of the country is a flat coastal plain with mountains in the east and hilly lowland in the west. The lowest point is at sea level and the highest is Bukit Pagon (1,850 m or 6,070 ft). The climatic regions of the country is as follows:

- Brunei-Muara District and Bandar Seri Begawan are humid tropical on the coast and lower elevation north and Humid subtropical in central Brunei-Muara District. (20 to 36 °C or 68 to 97 °F)
- Tutong District is tropical, hot in the north and warm in the south. (22 to 32 °C or 71.6 to 89.6 °F)
- Belait District is tropical, hot in the north and slightly warm in the south. (25 to 37 °C or 77.0 to 98.6 °F)
- Temburong District is humid subtropical in the higher elevation south and humid tropical on the coast and lower elevation north. (18 to 29 °C or 64 to 84 °F)

Climate data for Bandar Seri Begawan (Brunei Airport)
Month	Jan	Feb	Mar	Apr	May	Jun	Jul	Aug	Sep	Oct	Nov	Dec	Year
Record high °C (°F)	34.1 (93.4)	35.3 (95.5)	38.3 (100.9)	37.6 (99.7)	36.4 (97.5)	36.2 (97.2)	36.2 (97.2)	37.6 (99.7)	36.0 (96.8)	35.3 (95.5)	34.9 (94.8)	36.2 (97.2)	38.3 (100.9)
Mean daily maximum °C (°F)	30.4 (86.7)	30.7 (87.3)	31.9 (89.4)	32.5 (90.5)	32.6 (90.7)	32.5 (90.5)	32.3 (90.1)	32.4 (90.3)	32.0 (89.6)	31.6 (88.9)	31.4 (88.5)	31.0 (87.8)	31.8 (89.2)
Mean daily minimum °C (°F)	23.3 (73.9)	23.3 (73.9)	23.5 (74.3)	23.7 (74.7)	23.7 (74.7)	23.4 (74.1)	23.0 (73.4)	23.1 (73.6)	23.1 (73.6)	23.2 (73.8)	23.2 (73.8)	23.2 (73.8)	23.3 (73.9)
Record low °C (°F)	18.4 (65.1)	18.9 (66.0)	19.4 (66.9)	20.5 (68.9)	20.3 (68.5)	19.2 (66.6)	19.1 (66.4)	19.4 (66.9)	19.6 (67.3)	20.5 (68.9)	18.8 (65.8)	19.5 (67.1)	18.4 (65.1)
Average rainfall mm (inches)	292.6 (11.52)	158.9 (6.26)	118.7 (4.67)	189.4 (7.46)	234.9 (9.25)	210.1 (8.27)	225.9 (8.89)	226.6 (8.92)	264.4 (10.41)	312.3 (12.30)	339.9 (13.38)	339.6 (13.37)	2,913.3 (114.70)
Average rainy days	16	12	11	16	18	16	16	16	19	21	23	21	205
Average relative humidity (%)	86	85	84	84	85	84	84	83	84	85	86	86	85
Mean monthly sunshine hours	196	191	225	239	236	210	222	218	199	206	205	211	2,558
Source 1: World Meteorological Organisation, Deutscher Wetterdienst (extremes, 1971–2012 and humidity, 1972–1990)
Source 2: NOAA (sun, 1961–1990)

== Natural disasters ==
Since the nation lies outside of the typhoon belt and mostly untouched by earthquakes, it is less likely to experience major disasters, making it a relatively safe area to live and work. Foreigners from temperate climes who want to avoid harsh winters are drawn to the country by its milder temperature. Additionally, the weather is suitable for outdoor activities and water sports.

== Statistics ==
As of 2009, the statistics of Brunei is as follows:

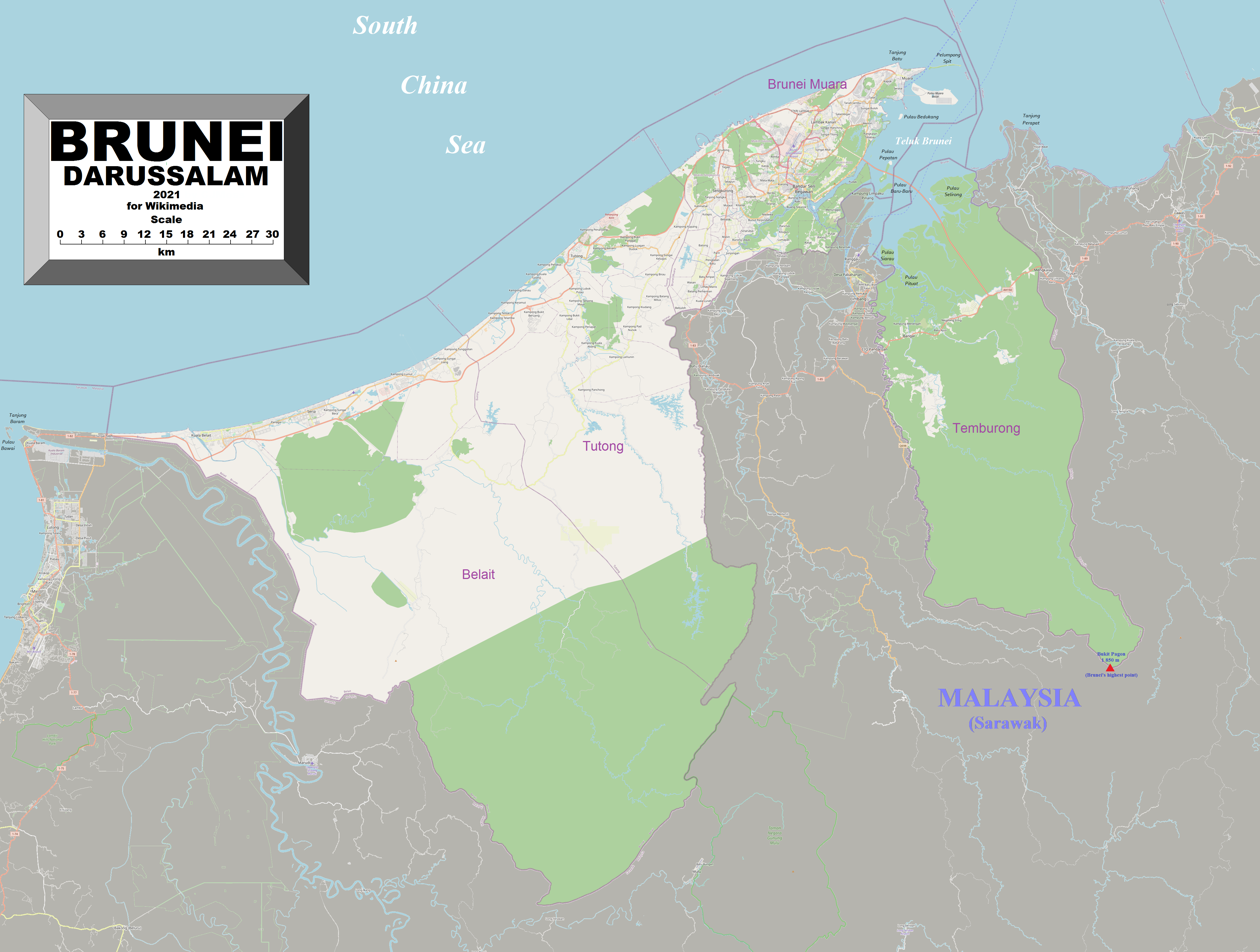
Enlargeable, detailed map of Brunei

Area:

- Total: 5,765 km^{2} (2,226 mi^{2})
- Land: 5,265 km^{2} (2,033 mi^{2})
- Water: 500 km^{2} (190 mi^{2})

Maritime claims:
territorial sea: 12 nmi (13.8 mi; 22.2 km)
exclusive economic zone: 10,090 km^{2} (3,900 mi^{2}) and 200 nmi (230.2 mi; 370.4 km) or to median line

Elevation extremes:
lowest point: South China Sea 0 m
highest point: Bukit Pagon 1,850 m

Natural resources: petroleum, natural gas, timber

Land use:
arable land: 0.76%
permanent crops: 1.14%
other: 98.10% (2012)

Irrigated land: 10 km^{2} (3.9 mi^{2}) (2003)

Total renewable water resources: 8.5 km^{3} (2.0 mi^{3})

Freshwater withdrawal (domestic/industrial/agricultural)
total: 0.09 km^{3}/yr (97%/0%/3%)
per capital: 301.6 m^{3}/yr (2009)

Environment – current issues: seasonal smoke/haze resulting from forest fires in Indonesia

Environment – international agreements:
party to: Biodiversity, Climate Change, Endangered Species, Hazardous Wastes, Law of the Sea, Ozone Layer Protection, Ship Pollution
