= Buddhism in Brunei =

Historical Population of Bruneian Buddhists
Year	Pop.	±%
1971	18,373	—
1981	27,063	+47.3%
1991	33,387	+23.4%
2001	28,480	−14.7%
2011	30,814	+8.2%
2016	29,495	−4.3%
Source: Bruneian Department of Statistics

Buddhism is the third largest religion in Brunei, after the majority state religion of Islam, and the slightly larger minority religion Christianity. Estimates vary, but some reports place the number of Buddhists in Brunei around 30,000, and the estimated percentage of Buddhists in Brunei around 7–8% of the total population. According to Brunei's official 2016 data, 7% (29,495) of the population practices Buddhism.

== History ==
Buddhism is thought to have had some presence in Brunei beginning in the 6th century CE, with Brunei and China have a known trading relationship since this time period. This continued alongside the influence of Hinduism with the Majapahit Empire, between the 13th to 16th century CE, with this influence decreasing drastically with the spread of Islam into Brunei and into the region. The modern Buddhist population of Brunei is mainly derived from Chinese migrants arriving between the 19th and 20th century, especially following a 1929 Chinese law allowing for dual nationality.

== Statistics ==
A large percentage of the Buddhist population is from the ethnically Chinese population of Brunei, which comprise 10.2% of the total population, and which is about 65% of the Chinese population embraced Buddhism. The percentage of Buddhists has fallen over time since the 1990s, in conjunction with the falling percentage of the ethnically Chinese population. Around one-third of Buddhists in Brunei are citizens, with the rest being permanent or temporary residents. Chinese Mahayana Buddhism is the most common denomination of Buddhism practiced, as this is the most common form of Buddhism practiced in China and surrounding states. Buddhism is commonly practiced alongside other religions or philosophical practices, particularly Taoism and Confucianism.

Distribution of Buddhists by District
Brunei Muara	Belait	Tutong	Temburong
19,134	8,814	1,415	132

== Religious freedom for Buddhists ==
Brunei is a sultanate, and has Islam as the official state religion. All other religions in Brunei have limited but guaranteed religious freedom, including Buddhists. Restrictions include limitations in building new places of worship, due to a fatwa discouraging support for the expansion of non-Islamic religions preventing permits from being granted, importation or distribution of non-Islamic religious literature, and strict laws against proselytizing to Muslim or religiously unaffiliated people. One particular case of restriction in relation to Buddhism is the continual limiting of festivities for the Chinese Lunar New Year, which placed a three-day time frame on all related revents, and limited events to venues such as Brunei's sole Chinese Buddhist temple.

Beyond limitations on religious freedom, non-Muslim groups including Buddhists also must adhere to many aspects of Brunei's sharia law, including the Sharia Penal Code introduced in 2013, and expanded upon in 2019. However, following the recent implementation of these laws, Buddhist and other minority religion populations have reported no difference in legal treatment from the state, and the state has put a moratorium on use of the death penalty intended to be implemented under this law.
