= Subregion (administrative division) =

Administrative division in some countries

A subregion or sub-region is a designation for an administrative division in some countries.

== List of sets ==
- Colombia: Antioquia Department - 9 subregions.
- Eritrea: Subregions of Eritrea
- Finland: Subregions of Finland
- Hungary: Subregions of Hungary LAU 1 ~ NUTS 4 (173 [statisztikai] kistérségek)
- Poland: NUTS:PL Level 3, 66 Podregiony
- Portugal: NUTS:PT Level 3, 30 subregiões
- Turkey: Subregions of Turkey (21 bölüm)
- Uganda: Category:Sub-regions of Uganda
