= Outline of Brunei =

Country in Southeast Asia

Flag of Brunei

Emblem of Brunei

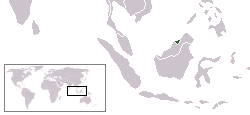
The location of Brunei

The following outline is provided as an overview of and a topical guide to Brunei:

Brunei is a sovereign country located on the north coast of the Island of Borneo in Southeast Asia. Apart from its coastline with the South China Sea it is surrounded by the state of Sarawak, Malaysia, and is separated into two parts by Limbang, which is part of Sarawak.

Brunei, the remnant of a very powerful sultanate, regained its independence from the United Kingdom on 1 January 1984.

== General reference ==
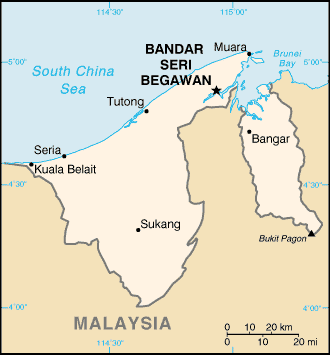
An enlargeable basic map of Brunei

- Pronunciation:
- Common English country name: Brunei or Brunei Darussalam
- Official English country name: The State of Brunei, Abode of Peace
- Common endonym(s):
- Official endonym(s):
- Adjectival(s): Bruneian
- Demonym(s):
- ISO country codes: BN, BRN, 096
- ISO region codes: See ISO 3166-2:BN
- Internet country code top-level domain: .bn

== Geography of Brunei ==
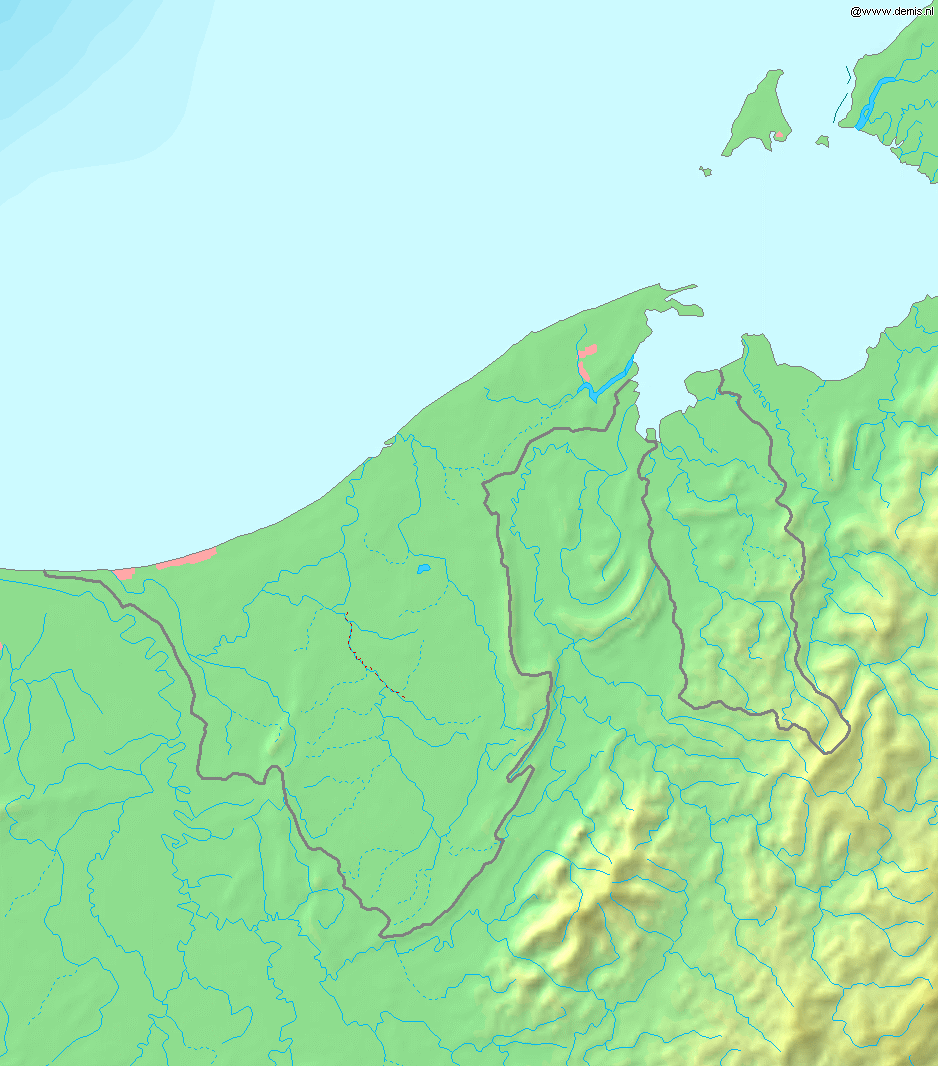
An enlargeable topographic map of Brunei

Geography of Brunei

- Brunei is: a country, on an island
- Location:
  - Northern Hemisphere and Eastern Hemisphere
  - Eurasia (though not on the mainland)
    - Asia
      - Southeast Asia
        - Maritime Southeast Asia
          - on the Island of Borneo
  - Time zone: ASEAN Common Time (UTC+08:00)
  - Extreme points of Brunei
    - High: Bukit Pagon 1,850 m (6,070 ft)
    - Low: South China Sea 0 m
  - Land boundaries: Malaysia 381 km
  - Coastline: 161 km
- Population of Brunei: 381,371(2008) - 170th most populous country
- Area of Brunei: 5,765 square kilometres (2,226 sq mi) - 172nd
- Atlas of Brunei

=== Environment of Brunei ===
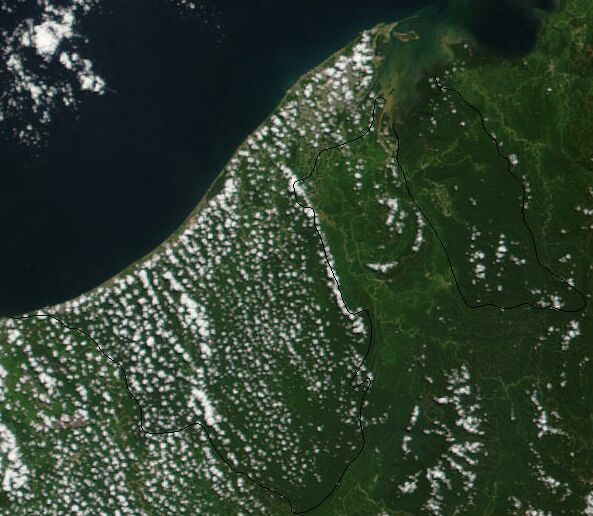
An enlargeable satellite image of Brunei

- Climate of Brunei
- Renewable energy in Brunei
- Protected areas of Brunei
- Wildlife of Brunei
  - Fauna of Brunei
    - Birds of Brunei
    - Mammals of Brunei

==== Natural geographic features of Brunei ====
- Rivers of Brunei

=== Regions of Brunei ===
==== Administrative divisions of Brunei ====
Administrative divisions of Brunei

- Districts of Brunei (daerahs)
  - Mukims of Brunei (mukims)

===== Districts of Brunei =====
Districts of Brunei

===== Mukims of Brunei =====
Mukims of Brunei

- Capital of Brunei: Bandar Seri Begawan
- Cities of Brunei

=== Demography of Brunei ===
Demographics of Brunei

== Government and politics of Brunei ==
Politics of Brunei

- Form of government: absolute monarchy
- Capital of Brunei: Bandar Seri Begawan
- Elections in Brunei
- Political parties in Brunei

=== Branches of the government of Brunei ===
Government of Brunei

==== Executive branch of the government of Brunei ====
- Head of state: Sultan of Brunei
- Head of government: Sultan of Brunei (holds the title "Prime Minister of Brunei")
- Councils:
  - Cabinet of Brunei (Council of Ministers)
  - Legislative Council of Brunei (consultive only)

==== Legislative branch of the government of Brunei ====
- Legislative Council of Brunei (unicameral, and consultive only)

==== Judicial branch of the government of Brunei ====
Court system of Brunei

=== Foreign relations of Brunei ===
Foreign relations of Brunei

- Diplomatic missions in Brunei
- Diplomatic missions of Brunei

==== International organization membership ====
The State of Brunei, Abode of Peace, is a member of:

- Asian Development Bank (ADB)
- Asia-Pacific Economic Cooperation (APEC)
- Asia-Pacific Telecommunity (APT)
- Association of Southeast Asian Nations (ASEAN)
- Association of Southeast Asian Nations Regional Forum (ARF)
- Commonwealth of Nations
- East Asia Summit (EAS)
- Group of 77 (G77)
- International Bank for Reconstruction and Development (IBRD)
- International Civil Aviation Organization (ICAO)
- International Criminal Police Organization (Interpol)
- International Federation of Red Cross and Red Crescent Societies (IFRCS)
- International Labour Organization (ILO)
- International Maritime Organization (IMO)
- International Mobile Satellite Organization (IMSO)
- International Monetary Fund (IMF)
- International Olympic Committee (IOC)
- International Organization for Standardization (ISO) (correspondent)
- International Red Cross and Red Crescent Movement (ICRM)
- International Telecommunication Union (ITU)
- International Telecommunications Satellite Organization (ITSO)
- Islamic Development Bank (IDB)
- Nonaligned Movement (NAM)
- Organisation of Islamic Cooperation (OIC)
- Organisation for the Prohibition of Chemical Weapons (OPCW)
- United Nations (UN)
- United Nations Conference on Trade and Development (UNCTAD)
- United Nations Educational, Scientific, and Cultural Organization (UNESCO)
- Universal Postal Union (UPU)
- World Customs Organization (WCO)
- World Federation of Trade Unions (WFTU)
- World Health Organization (WHO)
- World Intellectual Property Organization (WIPO)
- World Meteorological Organization (WMO)
- World Tourism Organization (UNWTO)
- World Trade Organization (WTO)

=== Law and order in Brunei ===
Law of Brunei

- Human rights in Brunei
  - LGBT rights in Brunei
  - Freedom of religion in Brunei
- Law enforcement in Brunei
- Bruneian nationality law

=== Military of Brunei ===
Military of Brunei

- Command
  - Commander-in-chief
- Forces
  - Army of Brunei
  - Navy of Brunei
  - Air Force of Brunei

=== Local government in Brunei ===
Local government in Brunei

== History of Brunei ==
History of Brunei

== Culture of Brunei ==
Culture of Brunei

- Cuisine of Brunei
- Languages of Brunei
- Media in Brunei
- National symbols of Brunei
  - Coat of arms of Brunei
  - Flag of Brunei
  - National anthem of Brunei
- People of Brunei
- Prostitution in Brunei
- Public holidays in Brunei
- Religion in Brunei
  - Christianity in Brunei
  - Islam in Brunei

=== Art in Brunei ===
- Music of Brunei

=== Sports in Brunei ===
Sports in Brunei

- Football in Brunei
- Brunei at the Olympics

== Economy and infrastructure of Brunei ==
Economy of Brunei

- Economic rank, by nominal GDP (2007): 105th (one hundred and fifth)
- Communications in Brunei
  - Internet in Brunei
- Companies of Brunei
- Currency of Brunei: Dollar
  - ISO 4217: BND
- Energy in Brunei
- Tourism in Brunei
- Transport in Brunei
  - Airports in Brunei

== Education in Brunei ==
Education in Brunei

== See also ==
Brunei

- Index of Brunei-related articles
- List of Brunei-related topics
- List of international rankings
- Member state of the Commonwealth of Nations
- Member state of the United Nations
- Outline of Asia
- Outline of geography
