= Christianity in Brunei =

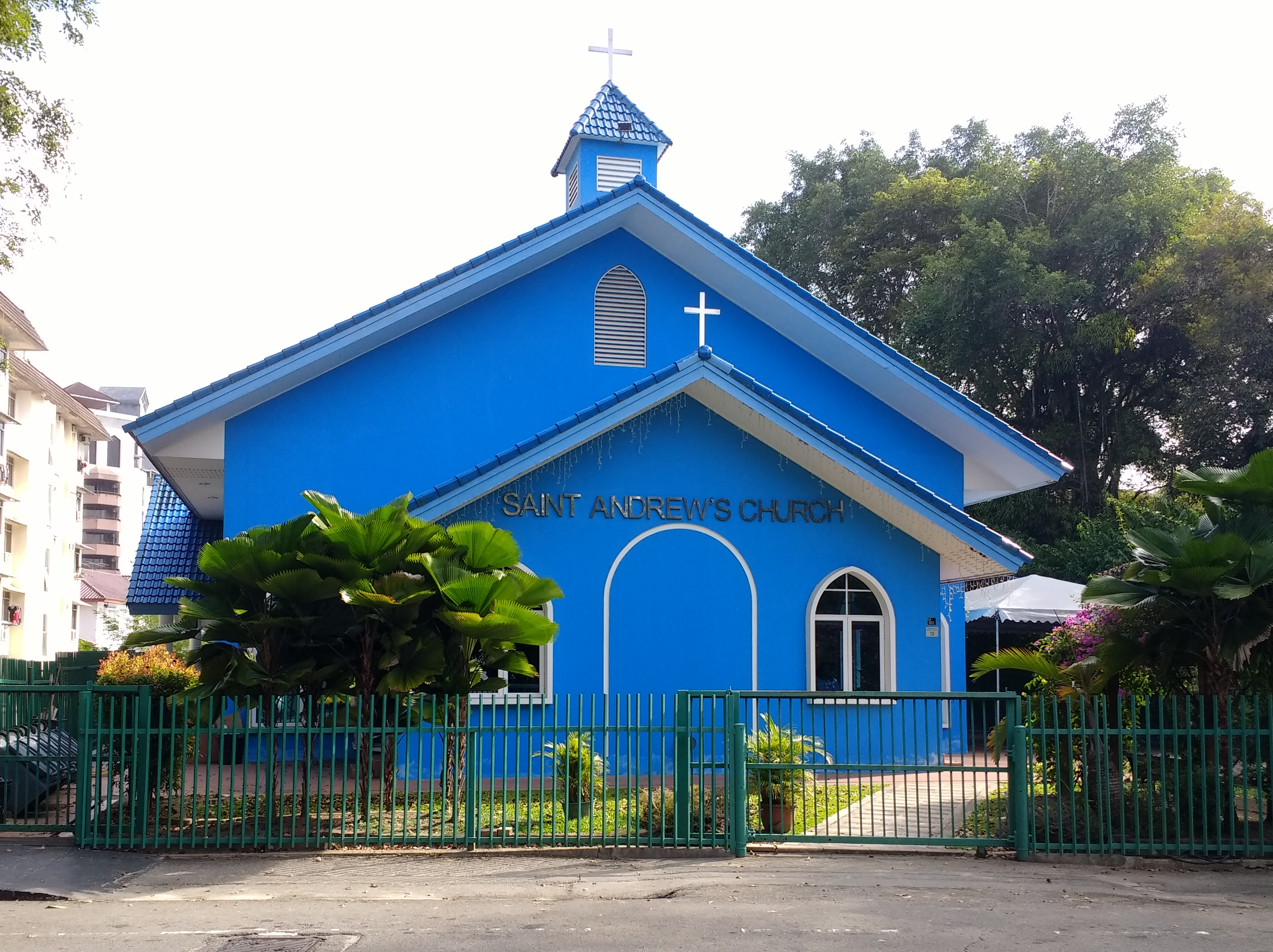
St. Andrew's Church in Bandar Seri Begawan

Historical Population of Bruneian Christians
Year	Pop.	±%
1981	18,767	—
1991	25,994	+38.5%
2001	31,291	+20.4%
2011	34,176	+9.2%
2016	29,510	−13.7%
Source: Bruneian Department of Statistics

Christianity in Brunei is the second largest religion practiced by about 8.7% of the population as of 2022. Other reports suggest that this number may be as high as 12%.

== Restrictions on religious freedom ==
Contact with Christians in other countries, the import of Bibles and public celebration of Christmas are banned by decree. Christians in Brunei are not allowed to proselytise. Schools are not allowed to teach Christianity. If religious organisations fail to register, its members can be imprisoned. Teaching of non-Muslim religions in schools is prohibited. Marriages between Christians and Muslims are prohibited. Brunei is the latest Muslim country to enact a law that makes apostasy a crime punishable with death. In 2013, it enacted Syariah (Sharia’a) Penal Code. Section 112(1) of the new law states that a Muslim who declares himself non-Muslim commits a crime punishable with death, or with imprisonment for a term not exceeding thirty years, depending on evidence. Under the required wait period between notification of law and its validity under Brunei’s constitution, its new apostasy law and corporal punishment were to be applied starting October 2014, and capital punishment was to be imposed starting October 2015.

In 2015, following up on a 2014 ban on celebrations that could lead Muslims astray or damage their faith, the Sultan of Brunei Hassanal Bolkiah banned public Christmas celebrations. Private celebrations are permitted to continue, so long as they are kept secret from Muslims.

In 2023, Freedom House rates the country's religious freedom as 0 out of 4.

== Protestantism ==
In 1996 Protestants made up 1.3% of the population of Brunei, 0.6% Evangelical.

In 2010 Protestants made up 4.4% of the population of Brunei.

In 2020, they made up 3% of the population.

- Borneo Evangelical Church
- Korean churches
- Methodist Church
- Seventh-day Adventist Church
- Anglican Church (Diocese of Kuching)
- Pentecostal and Charismatic churches

== Catholic Church ==
There are three Catholic parishes in Brunei. They belong to the Apostolic Vicariate of Brunei Darussalam. The cardinal Cornelius Sim was the first bishop and the Vicar Apostolic of Brunei until his death in May 2021. He was ordained bishop in 2005 and was made a cardinal by Pope Francis in 2020.

== See also ==
- Religion in Brunei
- Islam in Brunei
- Roman Catholicism in Brunei
- Human rights in Brunei
- Freedom of religion in Brunei
