= Slavery in Brunei =

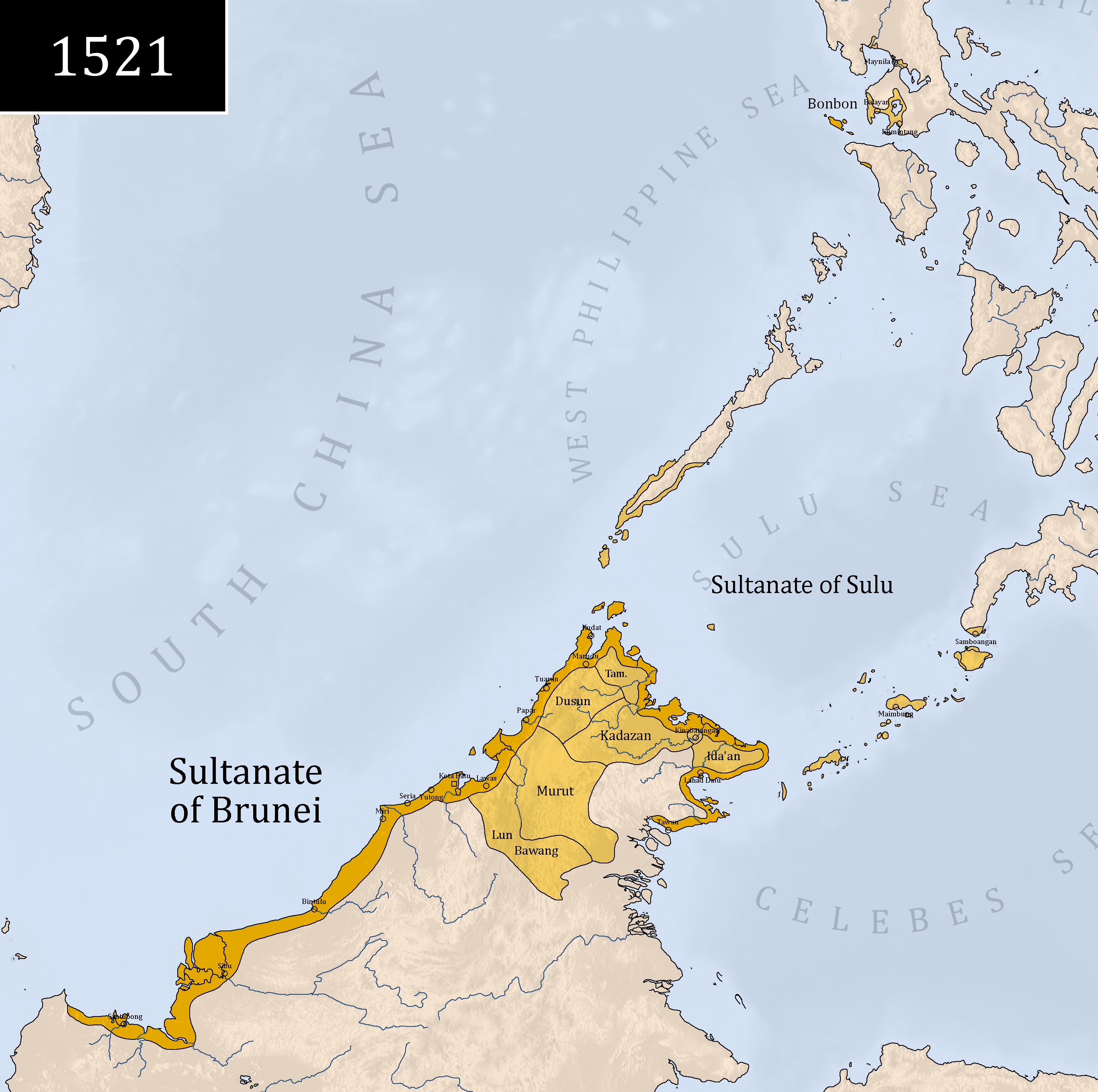
Bruneian Empire

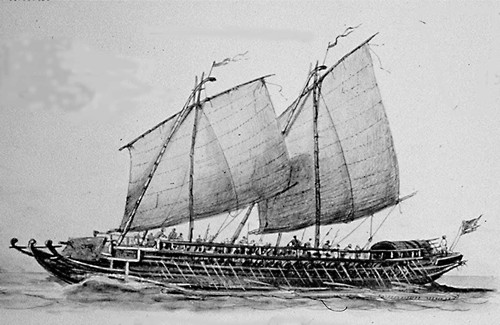
An Iranun lanong warship used for piracy and slave raids in the Sulu Sea

Chattel slavery was legal in the Sultanate of Brunei until the 20th century.

Historically, non-Muslim slaves were provided to Brunei via purchase from merchants and pirates; via enslavement of non-Muslim captives during warfare; and by enslavement of non-Muslim human tributes during taxation. Brunei came under British influence from the 1840s and became a British protectorate in 1888. The British conducted an abolitionist policy in Brunei, but could not enforce an abolition since Brunei was a protectorate and not a colony.

In the 20th century, the development of an economy based on rubber and oil via investments by Westerners, who did not use slave labor, resulted in a deterioration of the institution of slavery in Brunei. Slavery in Brunei was formally abolished by law in 1928.

== Background ==
Slavery prior to the introduction of Islam is less documented. The ruling elite and the coastal population converted to Islam in the late Middle Ages, while the inland tribal population retained their religion. From the 1840s onward, Brunei came under an increasing British influence, and Brunei became a British Protectorate in 1888, with a British Resident from 1906.

The Bruneian empire's influence reached as far as rural eastern Sarawak where enslavers pursued the Bidayuh, bone remains and cave paintings were found in Sireh Cave within Serian located more than 60 km southeast of Kuching which was evidence as a place of refuge and retreat.

== Slave trade ==
After conversion to Islam, the enslavement of Muslims were prohibited, which resulted in non-Muslims becoming targeted for enslavement by Muslim slave traders.

In the 16th-century, most slaves in Melaka, Patani and Brunei came from Java (Sunda, Madura and Balamabang) and had not been enslaved by warfare, but imported by merchants.

According to a British report from the 19th-century, slaves were provided to Brunei via several methods: by purchase from non-Muslim captives from pirates or commercial merchants; from the capture of non-Muslims by slave raids performed by the Bruneians themselves; and by human tributes provided from subjugated non-Muslim village chiefs.

The Sultan of Brunei commonly supplied slaves from the non-Muslim tribal chiefs, who were forced to send human tributes as slaves if they failed to pay the taxes demanded.

== Slave market ==
A significant reason for the use of slave labor in Malaya was the low population density, which made free laborers insufficient.

Except for slaves used for servant positions in the private households of rich people and for sexual slavery such as concubinage, slave laborers were used for a number of different roles, such as agricultural laborers as well as craftsmen.

=== Royal harem ===
Historically, the Royal harem of the sultan of Brunei included both wives as well as female enslaved concubines and servants. Slaves in Brunei were often non-Muslim Javanese, brought to Brunei by merchants.

The royal harem were described by a British resident in the 1850s as an institution where the women were isolated from the outside world to such a degree that the sultan preferred to attend to the repairs of the building himself, assisted by female slaves:

"The harem of the Brunei sultan is no splendid abode. It reminds one rather of a barn than of Haroun Alraschid's palace. In a building some seventy feet by forty, fourscore women live - wives, concubines, and slaves. I do not know that any white person has beheld the inside of it, for his majesty carries jealous care to the verge of hypochondria. [...] Putting aside the prosaic question of securing a good meal every day, inmates of a royal harem who receive but one set of clothes a year — and those of cotton or cheapest silk — will always be plotting to get finery and cash. The house is old, constantly needing repair, and the sultan will not allow even a carpenter to go inside it. [...] The old monarch handled tools himself, assisted by the female slaves."

== Abolition ==
In the 19th century, the Malay sultanates gradually came under the control of the colonial British Empire. Britain abolished the British slave trade by the Slave Trade Act 1807 and slavery by the Slavery Abolition Act 1833. Officially the British pursued an abolitionist policy in all areas under their control after 1833, but in practice they avoided addressing the issue if they feared it could cause problems with local power holders. The British did conduct an abolitionist policy in Brunei, but could not enforce an abolition since Brunei was a protectorate and not a colony.

In 1880, the British representative in Brunei noted that the pangerans (princes) of Brunei conducted slave raids toward the territories of the British Company and fought the British police who attempted to pursue and arrest them:

"Slave-dealing and kidnapping are part of the Bornean traditions, which must be dealt with by degrees", och att britterna inte kunde hoppas på att utsläcka denna sedvänja som tagit så lång tid för holländarna att bekämpa på Java.

Slavery was undermined in Brunei in the early 20th-century because of economic changes due to land and tax reform and the discovery of oil. The Land Code of 1909 abolished tribal land and replaced it with national land, which could be sold to foreigners; the aristocracy lost its right to conduct taxation of their own; oil was discovered and extracted by the British Malayan Ptroleum Company (BMPC), and Western foreigners, who used free laborers rather than slaves, started to buy land and invest in rubber plantations and the emerging oil industry. Changing economy dominated by Western foreigners who employed free laborers effectively undermined the institution of slavery, except for the slaves used for domestic servants and sexual slavery.

Slavery in Brunei was officially abolished in 1928.

== See also ==
- Slavery in Indonesia
- Slavery in Malaysia
- Human rights in Brunei
- Human trafficking in Brunei
- Sex trafficking in Brunei
- History of slavery in the Muslim world

- Slavery in the sultanates of Southeast Asia

- History of concubinage in the Muslim world
