= Human trafficking in Brunei =

In 2009 Brunei was a destination, and to a lesser extent, a source and transit country for men and women who were subjected to trafficking in persons, specifically forced labor and forced prostitution. Men and women from Indonesia, Malaysia, the Philippines, Pakistan, India, Bangladesh, China, and Thailand migrated to Brunei for domestic or other low-skilled labor but sometimes faced conditions of involuntary servitude upon arrival.

There were over 88,000 migrant workers in Brunei, some of whom faced debt bondage, non-payment of wages, passport confiscation, confinement to the home, and contract switching - factors that may contribute to trafficking. There were credible reports of nationals from South Asian countries subjected to nonpayment of wages and debt bondage in Brunei for up to two years to pay back foreign recruitment agents. Some of the 25,000 female domestic workers in Brunei were required to work exceptionally long hours without being granted a day for rest, creating an environment consistent with involuntary servitude. There are reports of women forced into prostitution in Brunei, and reports that women arrested for prostitution attest to having been victims of trafficking. Brunei is a transit country for trafficking victims in Malaysia, including Filipinas, who are brought to Brunei for work permit re-authorization before being returned to Malaysia.

In 2009 the Government of Brunei did not fully comply with the minimum standards for the elimination of trafficking; however, it is making significant efforts to do so. While the government had laws to prosecute trafficking, it had never prosecuted a trafficking case. The government did not proactively identify any trafficking victims during 2010, nor did it develop or implement formal procedures to identify victims of trafficking.

The U.S. State Department's Office to Monitor and Combat Trafficking in Persons placed the country in "Tier 2" in 2017. The country was moved to a ‘Tier 2 watch list’ by 2023, and to ‘Tier 3’ status in 2024.

Brunei ratified the 2000 UN TIP Protocol in March 2020. In the same year they also ratified the ASEAN Convention Against Trafficking in Persons (ACTIP).

In 2023, the Organised Crime Index gave Brunei a score of 5 out of 10 for human trafficking, noting that nobody had been prosecuted since 2019.

== Sex trafficking ==
Citizen and foreign women and girls are sex trafficked in Brunei. According to the 2020 Global Report on Trafficking in Persons, thousands of minors are trafficked in Brunei each year and subjected to domestic slavery or sexual exploitation.

== Prosecution (2009) ==
The government made no discernible anti-trafficking law enforcement efforts during 2010. The Government of Brunei prohibits sex and labor trafficking through its Trafficking and Smuggling Persons Order of 2004; however, there has never been a prosecution or conviction under this order.

The 2004 Order prescribes punishments of up to 30 years’ imprisonment, which is sufficiently stringent and commensurate with penalties prescribed for other serious offenses. Bruneian authorities did not investigate or prosecute any trafficking cases during 2009. The Department of Labor investigated labor disputes from foreign workers, including job switching, salary deductions for recruitment fees, salary based on false promises, and high recruitment fees paid by the prospective employee, although it did not identify any instances of trafficking among these cases. Labor disputes by foreign workers are usually tried under the Labor Act, which carries administrative penalties. Although government regulations prohibit wage deductions by agencies or sponsors and mandate that employees receive their full salaries, some foreign workers continued to pay high fees to overseas recruitment agents to obtain work in Brunei, leaving them vulnerable to debt bondage.

Authorities continue to rely on victims coming forward or being identified by foreign embassies, and do not proactively identify trafficking cases among vulnerable groups. During 2009, there were 127 complaints by foreign workers against employers who failed to pay salaries involving 34 companies and 26 employers. Eleven companies and 13 employers settled through reconciliation and arbitration, while the remaining cases remain under investigation.

== Protection (2009) ==
Brunei did not demonstrate significant efforts to identify and protect trafficking victims during 2009. Brunei does not have a proactive system to formally identify victims of trafficking among vulnerable groups, such as foreign workers and foreign women and children in prostitution. The government did not report identifying any trafficking victims in the past year. The government did not provide centrally coordinated training for its officials on identifying trafficking victims. While the Brunei police reported running a workshop on identifying victims for members of its anti-vice unit, the victim identification measures employed by the unit do not appear to be effective.

The government does not provide shelter or rehabilitative services to trafficking victims. One foreign mission reported 20 suspected trafficking cases of women forced into prostitution in Malaysia and traveling to Brunei to obtain work visa reentry permits. Brunei authorities were informed when the Filipino victims were entering the country, and allowed the victims to enter Brunei without proper documentation to assist in their escape from their traffickers.

The victims’ embassy provided shelter and repatriation assistance to the victims. The Brunei government did not, however, apprehend the suspected traffickers involved or conduct a criminal investigation. While immigration authorities actively identified and charged violators of immigration law, there were no cases reported of authorities identifying and assisting trafficking victims among immigration violators during 2009. As there may have been trafficking victims among these immigration violators, some may have been penalized for unlawful acts committed as a direct result of their being trafficked.

Although it is illegal for employers in Brunei to withhold wages of their domestic workers for more than 10 days, some families are known to withhold wages to compensate for recruitment fees they are charged and as a tool with which to control workers. There are no NGO's or international organizations in Brunei that provide support to trafficking victims, though the embassies of several source countries provide shelter, mediation, and immigration assistance to their nationals. The government does not provide legal alternatives to the removal of victims to countries where they may face hardship or retribution.

== Prevention (2009) ==
The Brunei government demonstrated limited prevention efforts during the reporting period. The government did not conduct any public awareness campaigns on trafficking. Officials participated in several regional training programs on trafficking. The government provides arrival briefings for foreign workers and runs a telephone hotline for worker complaints. There were no measures taken to reduce the demand for commercial sex acts.

== International response ==
Since 2022, Brunei has been demoted to the bottom rung of the United States government's human trafficking assessment, citing insufficient measures to aid migrant workers and prevent trafficking.

The U.S. State Department stated in its 2023 annual trafficking report that Brunei does not completely achieve the minimal requirements for the eradication of trafficking and is "not making significant efforts to do so.

It also emphasised the country's lack of trafficking convictions, saying Brunei continues to "detain, deport, and charge potential victims for crimes without employing a victim-centered approach.

== See also ==
- Human rights in Brunei
- Sex trafficking in Brunei
- Slavery in Brunei
