= Women in Brunei =

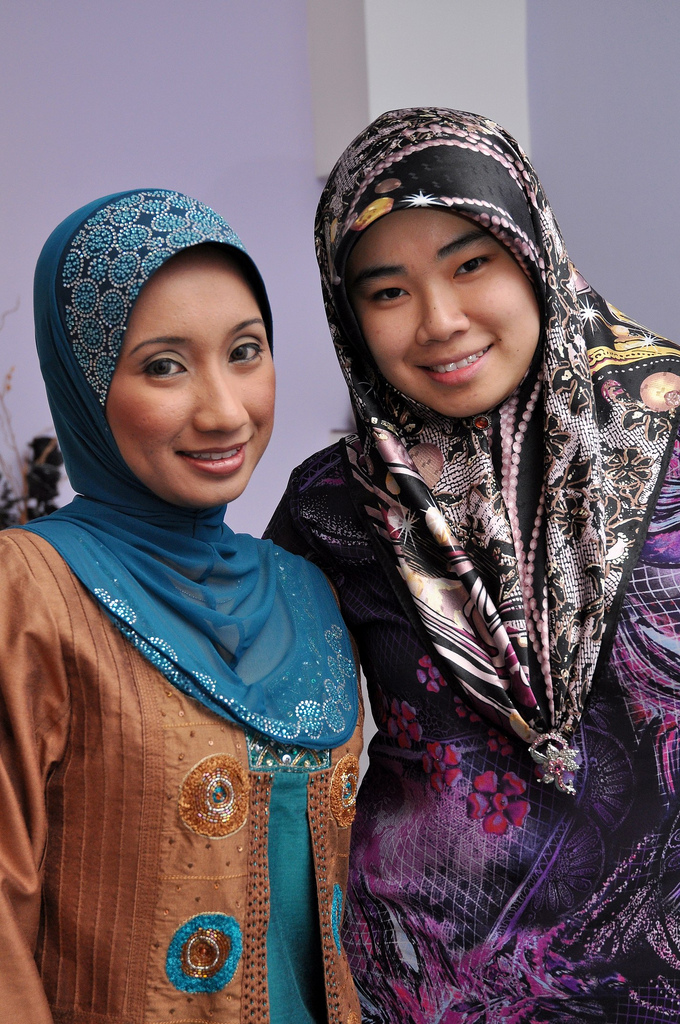
- Two Bruneian women

Gender Inequality Index
- Value: 0.259 (2021)
- Rank: 61st out of 191

Global Gender Gap Index
- Value: 0.681 (2025)
- Rank: 107th out of 148

Women in Brunei are women living in Brunei Darussalam. The U.S. Department of State has stated that discrimination against women is a problem in Brunei.

== Legal rights ==
The law prohibits sexual harassment and stipulates that whoever assaults or uses criminal force, intending thereby to outrage or knowing it is likely to outrage the modesty of a person, shall be punished with imprisonment for as much as five years and caning. The law stipulates imprisonment of up to 30 years, and caning with not fewer than 12 strokes for rape. The law does not criminalise spousal rape; it explicitly states that sexual intercourse by a man with his wife, as long as she is not under 13 years of age, is not rape. Protections against sexual assault by a spouse are provided under the amended Islamic Family Law Order 2010 and Married Women Act Order 2010. The penalty for breaching a protection order is a fine not exceeding B$2,000 or imprisonment not exceeding six months.

There is no specific domestic violence law, but arrests have been made in domestic violence cases under the Women and Girls Protection Act. The police investigate domestic violence only in response to a report by a victim. The police were generally responsive in the investigation of such cases. The criminal penalty for a minor domestic assault is one to two weeks in jail and a fine. An assault resulting in serious injury is punishable by caning and a longer prison sentence.

A special unit staffed by female officers has been established within the police department to investigate domestic abuse and child abuse complaints. A hotline was available for persons to report domestic violence. The Ministry of Culture, Youth, and Sports' (MCYS) Department of Community Development provides counselling for women and their spouses. Based on individual circumstances, some female and minor victims were placed in protective custody while waiting for their cases to be brought to court. Islamic courts staffed by male and female officials offered counselling to married couples in domestic violence cases. Officials did not encourage wives to reconcile with flagrantly abusive spouses. Islamic courts recognise assault as grounds for divorce.

Couples and individuals have the right to decide the number, spacing, and timing of their children, and have access to contraceptive devices and methods through the government and private clinics. According to information gathered by the UN, in 2008 the maternal mortality rate was an estimated 21 deaths per 100,000 live births. Citizens enjoy free medical and health care, including skilled attendance during childbirth, prenatal care, and essential obstetric and postpartum care. Women had equal access to diagnostic and treatment facilities for sexually transmitted diseases. Women had equal access to HIV treatment and counselling, as well as follow-up treatment.

In accordance with the government's interpretation of Qur'anic precepts, Muslim women have rights similar to those of Muslim men in areas such as divorce and child custody. Islamic law requires that males receive twice the inheritance of women. Civil law permits female citizens to pass their nationality on to their children and to own property and other assets, including business properties. Women with permanent positions in the government can now apply for travel allowances for their children. They cannot do so for husbands working in the private sector. With this exception, they receive the same allowance privileges as their college-educated male counterparts. According to government statistics, women made up 57 percent of the civil service force and held 28 percent of senior management posts.

=== Reproductive rights ===
Abortion in Brunei is largely illegal, with an exception if a woman's life is danger. Previously, the penalty for receiving an abortion was up to seven years in prison, with 10–15 years for the person performing the abortion. In 2014, Brunei's government implemented Sharia criminal law in a series of phases which was set to increase the punishment for abortion to execution by stoning. This part of the law was to come into effect in 2016, although it's now expected to come into effect in 2018. In 2016, a 22-year-old woman was sentenced to seven years in prison for obtaining an abortion using the abortion pill.

== Clothing norms ==
Many Muslim women in Brunei wear traditional head coverings known as the tudong, also spelled as tudung.

== Gender roles ==
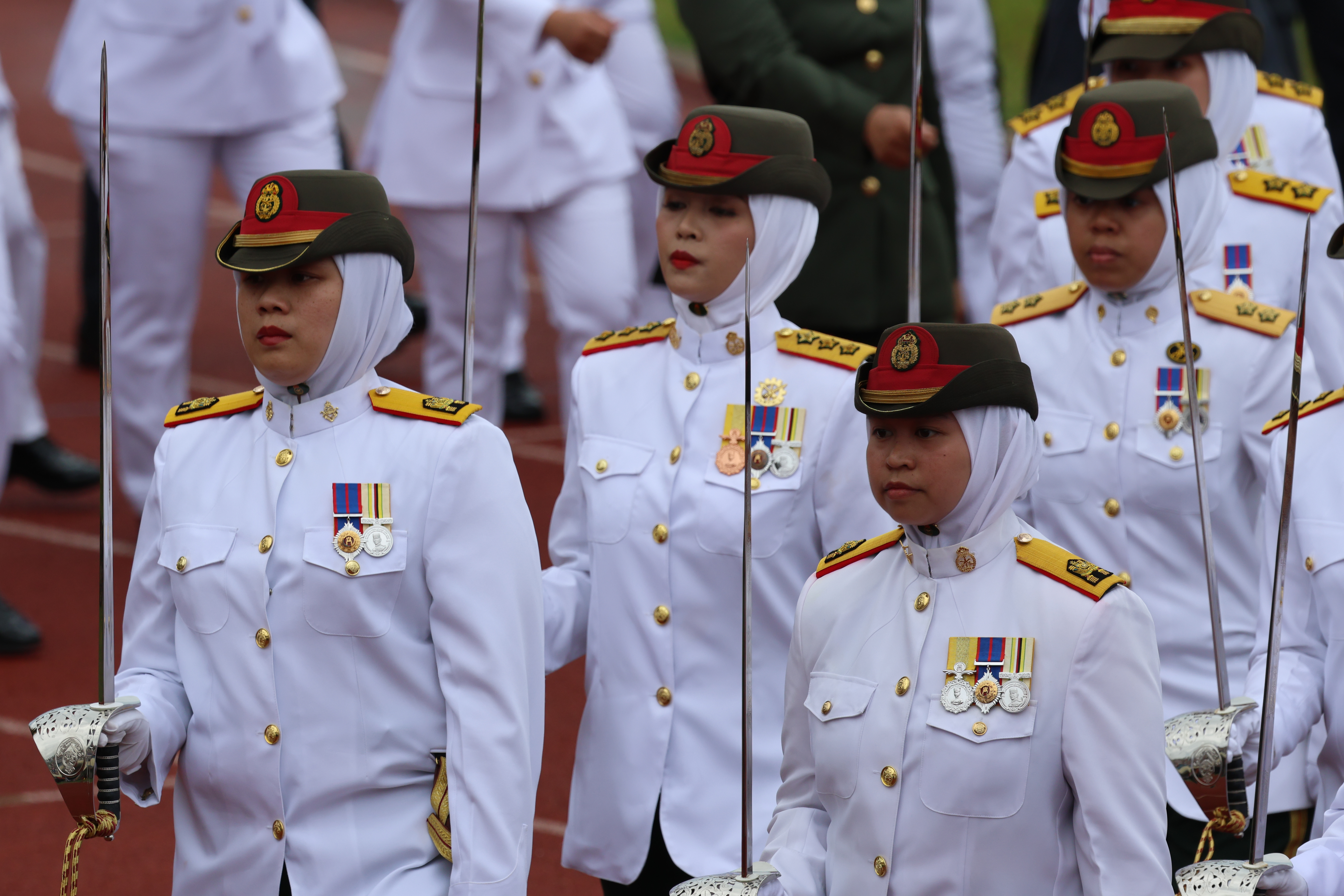
RBAF women marching in 2024

In recent years, Bruneian women have started to assume "positions of responsibility" in the Government of Brunei. They are able to take jobs in the armed forces of Brunei; however they are not allowed to serve while in combat situations. Hasimah Abu Bakar was the first woman to be promoted to lieutenant colonel in the Royal Brunei Armed Forces (RBAF) in 2006, and Norsuriati Sharbini was the first to be assigned to colonel in the RBAF in 2021.

== Sex trafficking ==
Citizen and foreign women and girls are sex trafficked in Brunei.

== See also ==
- Women in Asia
