= Freedom of religion in Brunei =

The constitution of Brunei states that while the official religion is the Shafi'i school of Sunni Islam, all other religions may be practiced "in peace and harmony." Apostasy and blasphemy are legally punishable by corporal and capital punishment, including stoning to death, amputation of hands or feet, or caning. Only caning has been used since 1957.

== Background ==
Brunei functions as a Unitary Islamic absolute monarchy, following the Constitution of Brunei. According to the Constitution, "the official religion of Brunei Darussalam shall be the Islamic Religion." At the same time, the constitution guarantees freedom of religion for individuals, stating: "all other religions may be practised in peace and harmony by the persons professing them." Additionally, Sunni Islam forms the foundation of Islamic law in the country, whenever applicable. In particular, the Shafi'i school of jurisprudence is the official madhhab. The other Sunni schools of jurisprudence (Hanafi, Maliki and Hanbali) may be consulted if required (and approved by the Sultan).

Since its independence in 1984, Brunei has operated a dual legal system, one secular and one Shari'a; Shari'a is legally enforceable only with Bruneian Muslims. However, the Syariah Penal Code Order 2013 has blurred those lines and interpretation can be unclear.

Despite the provision for freedom of religion in its constitution, the Government of Brunei has placed certain restrictions on the practice of non-Islamic beliefs, specifically on the practice of officially-delineated "deviant" groups (such as the Jehovah's Witnesses and adherents of the Baháʼí Faith), and the freedom to proselytise non-Islamic faiths. In addition, non-Muslims are often co-erced to follow Islamic guidelines by social pressure, according to a 2020 Report by the US Embassy in Brunei.

The Government of Brunei sponsored a multi-faith delegation to the ASEM Interfaith Dialogue in Cyprus in July 2006.

The law discourages Muslims from learning about other faiths. At the same time, Islamic authorities organize a range of activities to explain and propagate Islam. Authorities also offer financial and housing incentives to prospective converts to Islam.

== Religious demography ==
In 2021, Brunei had a population of 422,700, including temporary residents. Of that population, 82.1% are Muslim, 8.7% are Christian, 7% are Buddhist and 5% represent other faiths; the remainder did not state a religious affiliation.

There are 110 mosques and prayer halls, six Christian churches, three Chinese temples, and one Hindu temple officially registered in the country.

Proselytizing by faiths other than the officially sanctioned branch of Islam is not permitted. There are no missionaries reported working in the country.

== Status of religious freedom ==
=== Legal and policy framework ===
The Government describes the country as a Malay Islamic Monarchy and actively promotes adherence by its Muslim residents to Islamic values and traditions. The Ministry of Religious Affairs deals solely with Islam and Islamic laws, which exist alongside secular laws and apply only to Muslims. The Syariah Penal Code Order 2013 came into full effect in 2019 and is legally enforceable only with Bruneian Muslims.

The Societies Order of 2005 compels all organizations, including any religious group that is a non-Sunni sect of Islam, to register. The order also requires organizations to name all members. An organization that fails to register can face charges of unlawful assembly and be fined. Individuals who participate in or influence others to join unregistered organizations can be fined, arrested, and imprisoned. Approval to register is at the discretion of the Registrar of Societies (who is also the Commissioner of Police) and may be refused for any reason. There were no reports of religiously motivated refusal to register organizations during the reporting period. The Government continued to use zoning laws that prohibit the use of private homes as places of worship. While the country has three officially registered Chinese temples, other unregistered temples, many of which are in private homes, are known to operate but have not faced charges for failing to register.

=== Restrictions on religious freedom ===
==== Law for Muslims ====
Since the early 1990s, the Government has reinforced the legitimacy of the hereditary monarchy and the observance of traditional and Muslim values by asserting a national ideology known as the Melayu Islam Beraja (MIB), or Malay Islamic Monarchy, the genesis of which reportedly dates from the 15th century. MIB principles have been adopted as the basis for government, and all meetings and ceremonies commence with a Muslim prayer. At citizenship ceremonies, non-Muslims must wear national dress, which includes Muslim head coverings for men and women. There is no legal requirement for women to wear head coverings in public, and government officials are portrayed regularly, if infrequently, in the media without head coverings. There is social pressure for women to wear head coverings in public.

Despite constitutional provisions providing for the full and unconstrained exercise of religious freedom, the Government restricted the practice of non-Muslim religions by prohibiting proselytizing of all faiths other than Sunni Islam. The Government has banned the importation of religious teaching materials or scriptures such as the Bible and refused permission to establish or build churches, temples, or shrines. The Government allows only the practice of Sunni Islam. It has banned several other religious groups that it considers deviant, including the Islamic Al-Arqam movement and the Baháʼí Faith. In February 2007 the Government banned as deviant teachings three sects: Saihoni Tasipan, Al-Ma'unah, and Abdul Razak Muhammad. The Government readily investigated and took prescriptive action against purveyors of radical Islam or "deviationist" Islamic groups. The Government periodically warned the population about "outsiders" preaching radical Islamic fundamentalist or unorthodox beliefs and warned Muslims against Christian evangelists, most recently in 2005 during a sermon at the national mosque.

A 1964 fatwa issued by the State Mufti strongly discourages Muslims from assisting non-Muslim organizations in perpetuating their faiths, and the Ministry of Religious Affairs reportedly uses the fatwa to influence other government authorities either to deny non-Muslim religious organizations permission for a range of religious and administration activities or to fail to respond to applications from these groups. Nonetheless, Christian churches and their associated schools have been allowed for safety reasons to repair, expand, and renovate buildings on their sites and to carry out minor building works. In 2006 the Government approved a request from Anglican St. Andrews Church to undertake a major refurbishment of its buildings, a significant development. Following a suspension of the permit, the reconstruction permit was reissued in March 2007, and reconstruction was largely completed during the reporting period.

==== Law for Non-Muslims ====
The Government does not impose any restrictions on Chinese temples to celebrate seasonal religious events provided that the temples obtain permission from relevant authorities. Since 2005 the Government has begun permitting Chinese Lunar New Year celebrations outside the grounds of the Chinese temple, and public lion dances that are an integral part of celebrating this event at businesses and homes were common during the reporting period. Any public assembly of five or more persons requires official approval in advance, regardless of the purpose of the assembly, religious or other.

Unregistered temples - as with any unregistered organization - were not allowed to organize functions and celebrations.

The Government routinely censors magazine articles on other faiths, blacking out or removing photographs of crucifixes and other Christian religious symbols. Government officials also guard against the distribution and sale of items that feature photographs of undesirable or religious symbols.

There were reports in the past that agents of the Internal Security Department monitored religious services at Christian churches and that senior church members believed that they were under intermittent surveillance.

The Government asks visitors to identify their religion on their landing cards, although many persons do not comply and have not been challenged.

==== Law for everyone else ====
Authorities continued to arrest persons for offenses under Shari'a, such as khalwat (close proximity between the sexes) and consumption of alcohol. According to statistics released by religious authorities, 31 khalwat cases were reported during the period covered by this report. The arresting forces in these crackdowns were civilian and religious police. Most of those arrested or detained for a first offense were fined and released, although, in the past, some persons were imprisoned for up to four months for repeated offenses of khalwat. By law, men are liable to a $634 (B$1000) and women to a $317 (B$500) fine if convicted of khalwat.

Religious authorities regularly participated in raids to confiscate alcoholic beverages and non-halal meats. They also monitored restaurants and supermarkets to ensure conformity with halal practice. Restaurants and service employees that served a Muslim in daylight hours during the fasting month were subjected to fines. Non-halal restaurants and non-halal sections in supermarkets were allowed to operate without interference from religious authorities.

Melayu Islam Beraja is a compulsory subject for students in public and private schools and in universities. Ugama is a seven-year education system that teaches Islam under the Sunni Shafi'i school of thought and this is compulsory for Muslim citizens until the age of 14. Most school textbooks were illustrated to depict Islam as the norm, and there were no depictions of practices of other religions in textbooks; the Government allows parents to give religious instruction to children in their own homes.

Any person standing for election, at village, council or government level, must be a Muslim. The only exception is if the Sultan grants an exemption.

Religious authorities encouraged Muslim women to wear the tudong, a traditional head covering, and many women did so. In government schools and at higher institutes of learning, Muslim and non-Muslim female students must wear Muslim attire, including a head covering as a part of their uniform. Male students are expected to wear the songkok (hat). In the past there were reports that non-Muslim women teachers at public schools were sometimes pressured by government officials or colleagues to wear Muslim attire.

In accordance with the Government's interpretation of Qur'anic precepts, Muslim women have similar rights as Muslim men in important areas such as in divorce and custody of children as stated under the Emergency (Islamic Family Law) Order 1999. A Muslim woman can file for divorce on the grounds of the long absence of her husband without valid reason, his long imprisonment, refusal to provide for his wife, or impotence. In case of divorce, the young children remain in custody of their mother; however, the father must provide financial support for the children's welfare. The Government's interpretation of Islamic practice for inheritance holds that female Muslims' inheritance will be half the size of the male's inheritance. A 2002 amendment to the Brunei Nationality Act allows citizenship to be transmitted through the mother as well as through the father.

Marriage between Muslims and those of other faiths is not permitted, and non-Muslims must convert to Islam if they wish to marry a Muslim. Muslims who wish to convert to another religion face such official and societal pressure not to leave Islam that conversion is extremely difficult if not impossible in practice. Permission from the Ministry of Religious Affairs must be obtained to convert from Islam, and there were no reports of anyone requesting such permission during the reporting period. There were instances during the period covered by this report of persons, often foreign women, who converted to Islam as a prelude to marrying Muslims. Government statistics reported that eight percent of the 312 conversions to Islam during the reporting period were due to marriage. Unlike in the past, there were no cases of divorced Muslim converts who, because of official and societal pressure, remained officially Muslim if they did not wish to do so.

=== Abuses of religious freedom ===
Those adhering to faiths other than Islam are allowed to practice their beliefs, provided that they exercise restraint and do not proselytize. In the past non-Muslims who proselytized were arrested or detained and sometimes held without charges for extended periods of time; however, no such arrests or detentions occurred since.

There were no reports of religious prisoners or detainees in the country.

=== Forced religious conversion ===
There were reports of forced religious conversion, including of minor U.S. citizens who had been abducted or illegally removed from the United States, or of the refusal to allow such citizens to be returned to the United States. If parents convert to Islam, conversion of the child requires his or her personal commitment and is not automatic. A person must be at least 14 years old to make such a commitment.

Muslims are not permitted to renounce or change their religion. Non-Muslims must be at least 14 years and seven months old to convert or renounce their religion. If either parent converts to Islam, their children younger than 14 years and seven months automatically become Muslim.

== Societal abuses and discrimination ==
The country's various religious groups coexist peacefully, but ecumenical interaction is hampered by the dominant Islamic religious ethos, which discourages Muslims from learning about other faiths. At the same time, Islamic authorities organize a range of dakwah or proselytizing activities and incentives to explain and propagate Islam. Among the incentives to converts, especially those from the indigenous communities in rural areas, are monthly financial assistance, new homes, electric generators, and water pumps.

The country's national philosophy, the MIB concept, discourages open-mindedness to religions other than Islam, and there are no programs to promote understanding of other religions. The country's indigenous people generally convert either to Islam or Christianity but rarely to Buddhism.

== Criticisms ==
There has been international criticism of what is seen as Brunei's oppression of non-practising Muslims or people of other faiths.

In 2019 Hollywood actor George Clooney led a campaign calling for the boycott of nine international hotels as they were owned by a subsidy of Brunei's government, the Brunei Investment Agency (BIA). The campaign was in response the new SPC which included penalties of "stoning and whipping to death any of its citizens that are proved to be gay." In response, the Sultan of Brunei issued a "de facto moratorium" on the death penalty.

Human Rights Watch has published articles on the potential persecution that the SPC could lead to.

=== 2020s ===
In a 2023 report of Freedom House's Freedom in the World 2020, the country's religious freedom is rated as 1 out of 4, the reports continues "Ethnic and religious minorities have few opportunities for political participation, even on a local level. Village council candidates must be Muslim, and ministers and deputy ministers must be Muslim and Malay unless the sultan grants an exception".

In the same year, Open Doors, a Christian evangelistic organization, ranked Brunei as the 46th worst country to be a Christian. Local cultural practice sees a Christian convert from a Muslim background is likely to be disowned by their family and forced to leave home. While converts may suffer beatings, humiliation and threats of imprisonment from religious authorities. There is mandatory religious education of children, new 2023 rules now force children as young as three to have Islamic studies included in their general studies. Also, non-traditional Christian communities are not allowed to be registered as churches, instead they must be registered as companies (or societies or family centres) and thus must submit financial and operational reports to the government every year.

== See also ==
- Religion in Brunei
- Islam in Brunei
- Christianity in Brunei
- Roman Catholicism in Brunei
- Human rights in Brunei
