= Sex trafficking in Brunei =

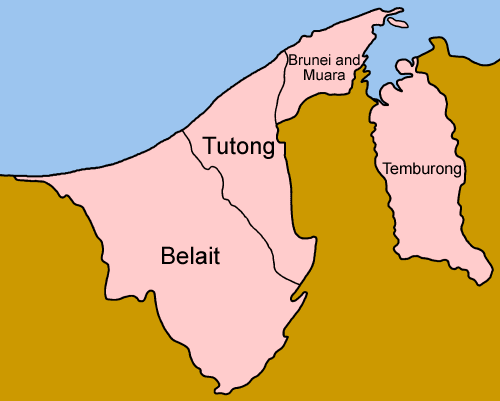
Citizen and foreign victims are sex trafficked into and out of the districts of Brunei. They are raped and physically and psychologically harmed in locations within these administrative divisions.

Sex trafficking in Brunei is primarily affects impoverished individuals and migrant workers especially Thai people. The victims were deceived, threatened, or coerced into sexual exploitation and confined in uninhabitable conditions. In the United States Department of State's Trafficking in Persons Report, Brunei was placed on the Tier 2 Watch List in 2019 for inadequate anti-trafficking efforts before being upgraded to Tier 2 in 2026 following its first trafficker convictions since 2016 and the creation of an enforcement oversight committee, alongside advocacy by local youth initiatives such as Youth Against Slavery Brunei.

== History ==
In 2019, Government of Brunei was placed on the Tier 2 Watch List in the United States Department of State's Trafficking in Persons Report due to inadequate anti-sex trafficking initiatives. In 2026, theír ranking was subsequently upgraded to Tier 2 after the government secured its first convictions of traffickers under its anti-trafficking law since 2016 and established a committee to strengthen the enforcement of the anti traficcking.

Victims are individuals living in poverty and migrants who are vulnerable to sex trafficking, where they are deceived, threatened, or forced into sexual exploitation. They suffer physical and psychological trauma because they confined and guarded in uninhabitable condition. Their families are also threatened to prevent them from reporting to the authorities, and victims frequently contract sexually transmitted diseases from rape.The victim is foreign workers which is identified as two women and one teenager who came from Thailand

== Anti-sex trafficking organizations ==
YAS Brunei, a Bruneian youth initiative that is a product of Young Southeast Asian Leaders Initiative, fights sex trafficking in the country.

== See also ==
- Human rights in Brunei
- Prostitution in Brunei
- Slavery in Brunei
