= Religion in Brunei =

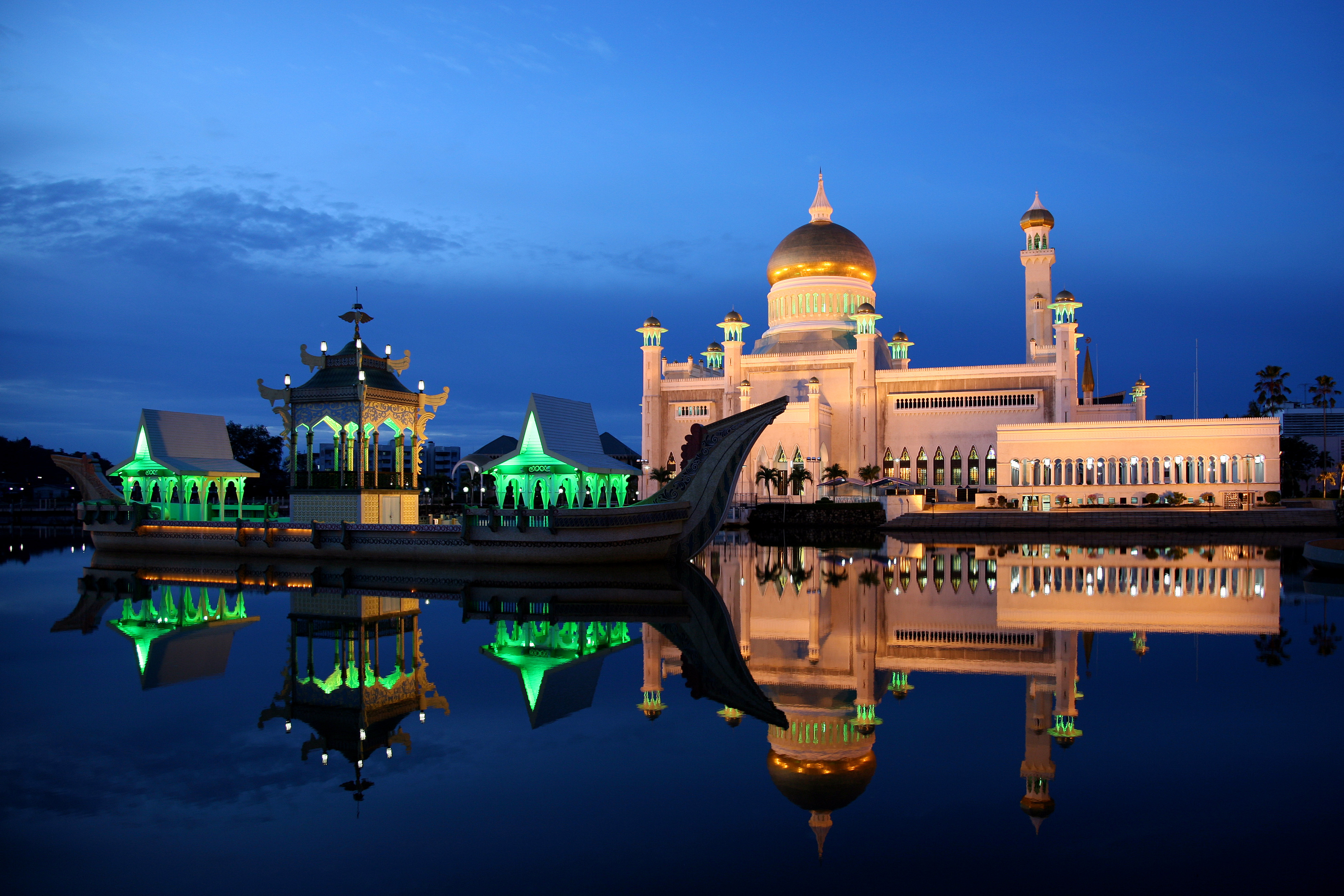
Sultan Omar Ali Saifuddin Mosque at night

Population by religion from the Brunei 2021 census
1. Islam (82.1%)
2. Christianity (6.70%)
3. Buddhism (6.30%)
4. Others (4.90%)

Among religions in Brunei, Sunni Islam is predominant. In 2021, the government census showed that 82.1% of Brunei's population is Muslim. However, other religions also have a considerable foothold in Brunei: 6.7% of the population is Christian and another 6.3% is Buddhist. The remaining 4.9% subscribe to various religions, including indigenous religions.

Islam is the state religion of Brunei. Freedom of religion and the right to practice privately are nominally guaranteed. Furthermore, some non-Islamic holidays, such as Lunar New Year, Christmas, Vesak day and Gawai Dayak, are recognised. These rights, however, are limited in practice: religious education is controlled, even in the Chinese, Christian and private schools. Brunei's penal code criminalizes efforts to promote religions other than Islam to Muslims or the non-religious, including persuading religious conversion, exposing Muslim children to other faiths, or opposing Islamic authorities. It also punishes those who assist in such acts. These provisions marginalize non-Muslims and non-believers, severely restricting their religious freedom in violation of international human rights standards. Non-Muslims must be at least 14 years and 7 months old if they want to convert to another religion. A minor will automatically become a Muslim if their parents convert to Islam.

The state madh'hab of Islam is the Shafi'i school of jurisprudence of Sunni Islam. Most of Brunei's Muslim population subscribe to the Shafi'i school as well, and Shafi'i is a major source of law for the country. However, with the Sultan's permission, lawmakers may also consult the other three Sunni schools of fiqh.

Brunei Darussalam Official Censuses
		Islam	Christianity	Buddhism	Others	Total:
1981 Census	Number	122,269	18,767	27,063	24,733	192,832
1981 Census	Percent	63.4%	9.7%	14.1%	12.8%	100%
1991 Census	Number	174,973	25,994	33,387	26,128	260,482
1991 Census	Percent	67.2%	10%	12.8%	10%	100%
2001 Census	Number	249,822	31,291	28,480	23,251	332,844
2001 Census	Percent	75%	9.4%	8.6%	7%	100%
2011 Census	Number	309,962	34,176	30,814	18,420	393,272
2011 Census	Percent	78.8%	8.7%	7.8%	4.7%	100%
2016 Census	Number	337,391	29,510	29,495	20,860	417,256
2016 Census	Percent	80.9%	7.1%	7%	5%	100%
2021 Census	Number	362,035	29,462	27,745	21,473	440,715
2021 Census	Percent	82.1%	6.7%	6.3%	4.9%	100%

Religion in Brunei Darussalam based on Ethnicity (2011 Estimate)
Ethnicity	Islam	Buddhism	Christianity	Folk Religion / Others
Malays	100%	N/A (all Malays are Muslims according to the Bruneian Law.)		
Chinese	14%	65%	20%	1%
Indigenous tribes	50%	N/A	15%	35%
Non-Citizens	50%	15%	33%	2%
Total:	78.8%	7.8%	8.7%	4.7%

== Islam ==
Islam is Brunei's official religion, 82.70 percent of the population is Muslim. There were 362,035 Sunni Muslims in Brunei as of 2021—190,314 men and 171,721 women. 193 people converted to Islam in Brunei–Muara District, 78 in Belait District, 112 in Tutong District, and 15 in Temburong District in 2023. The number of Bruneian converts to Islam has increased ever since Islam became the official religion of the country in 1954. And by 2004, it was recorded that over 16,000 Bruneians had converted to Islam. From 2009 to 2020, there have been 5,884 individuals who have converted to Islam in Brunei.

== Minority faiths ==
=== Christianity ===
Historical Population of Bruneian Christians
Year	Pop.	±%
1981	18,767	—
1991	25,994	+38.5%
2001	31,291	+20.4%
2011	34,176	+9.2%
2016	29,510	−13.7%
Source: Bruneian Department of Statistics

Christianity in Brunei is the second largest religion practiced by about 8.7% of the population as of 2022. Other reports suggest that this number may be as high as 12%.

=== Buddhism ===
Historical Population of Bruneian Buddhists
Year	Pop.	±%
1971	18,373	—
1981	27,063	+47.3%
1991	33,387	+23.4%
2001	28,480	−14.7%
2011	30,814	+8.2%
2016	29,495	−4.3%
Source: Bruneian Department of Statistics

Buddhism is the third largest religion in Brunei, after the majority state religion of Islam, and the slightly larger minority religion Christianity. Estimates vary, but some reports place the number of Buddhists in Brunei around 30,000, and the estimated percentage of Buddhists in Brunei around 7–8% of the total population. According to Brunei's official 2016 data, 7% (29,495) of the population practices Buddhism.

=== Hinduism ===
Almost the entire Hindu community in Brunei is made up of people of Indian origin. The approximate size is a few thousand. There are two Hindu temples in Brunei. According to the 2001 census, 124 of the Hindus are citizens and another 91 are permanent residents. The rest are non-citizens.

Hinduism is practised by a minority of ethnic Tamils, which comprises mainly doctors, engineers working in Brunei and others working in the education sector, both at school and university or college level as professors and teachers as well as research personnel. There is a Nepalese community in Seria, Belait in Brunei, made up of members of the British Army's Brigade of Gurkhas. Historically, they have contributed in ensuring Brunei's autonomy. Brunei's Hindu Welfare Board is a 50 year old Hindu religious organisation with approximately 3,000 members. There are two small Hindu temples in the country, though only one is officially registered under Brunei's government. The temple is located on the territory of the Gurkha Regiments in Seria, Brunei. This Hindu temple is visited for prayer by the local Hindu and Buddhist communities.

== See also ==
- Freedom of religion in Brunei
