= Islam in Brunei =

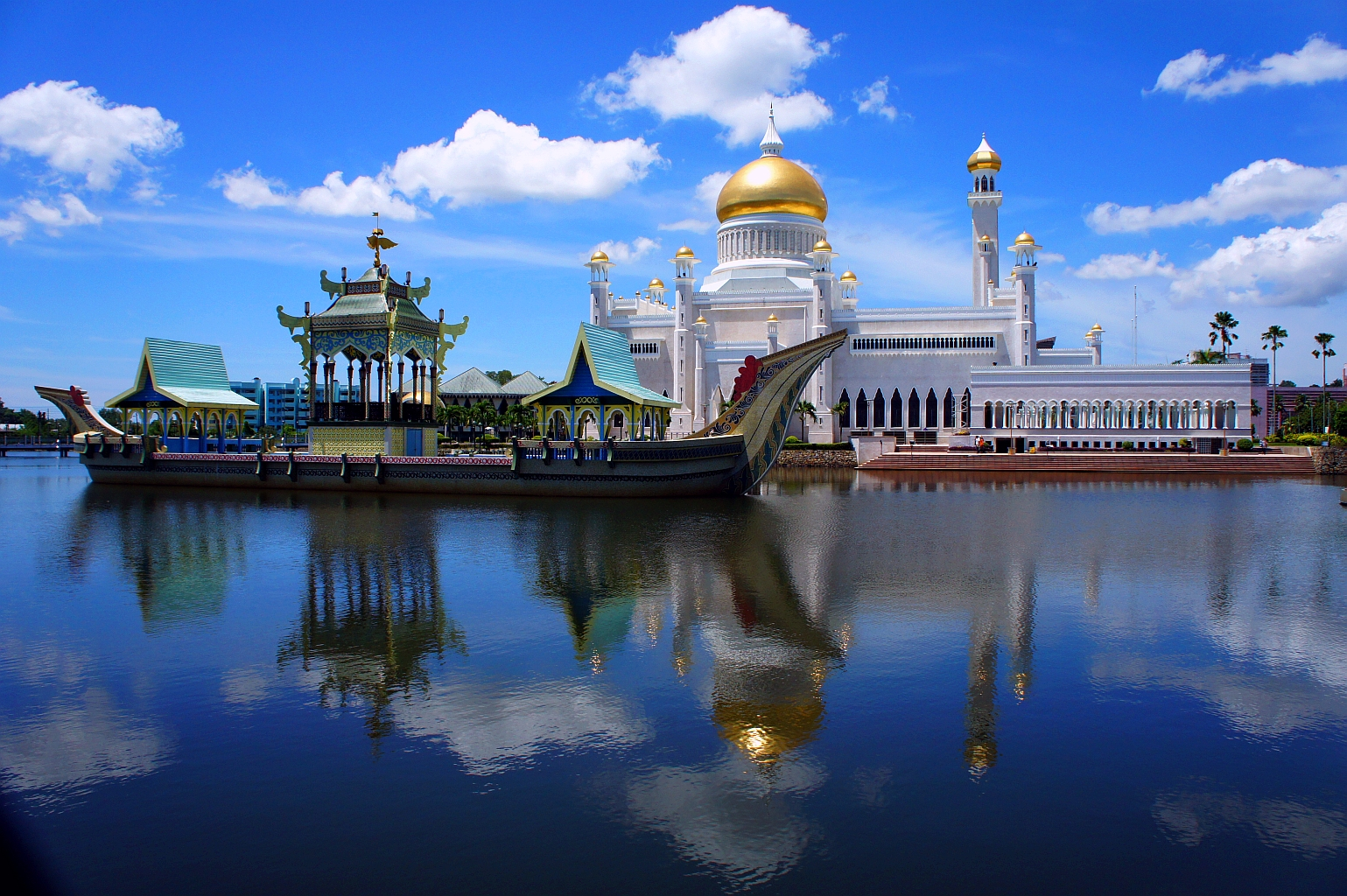
Omar Ali Saifuddien Mosque, a national landmark and state mosque in Brunei

Islam is Brunei's official religion, 83% of the population is Muslim, most of the other Muslim groups are Malay Kedayans (converts from indigenous tribal groups), local Chinese and Dayak Iban converts. Islam was introduced to Brunei by traders arriving from Persia, Arabia, India, China and by the 14th century the royal house had by then converted to Islam.

The official religion of Brunei is Sunni Islam. With the noteworthy exception of Sultan Omar Ali Saifuddien III's tomb, which has been turned into a pilgrimage destination during Ramadan, Brunei Malay Muslims do not often revere saints or holy tombs, unlike in other Muslim societies. Brunei's pre-Islamic ancestor worship customs had an impact on the custom of visiting cemeteries during Ramadan to purify and offer prayers for the deceased.

== History ==
=== Arrival and early history of Islam ===
Although the exact date of Islam's entrance in Brunei is unknown, evidence points to as far back as the 10th century, when P'u-lu-shieh, a Chinese Muslim diplomat and trader, arrived in 977. A delegation from Brunei led by another Muslim, P'u A-li (Abu Ali), visited China afterwards, implying that although the monarch was not a Muslim, Islam was practiced in the country's royal court. Islamic tombstones, such as that of the Chinese Muslim Pu Kung Chih-mu, who was buried in 1264, show that Islam was prevalent in Brunei long before Awang Alak Betatar (later Sultan Muhammad Shah) converted to Islam for the first time in the late 14th century. Although some historians from Europe contend that Brunei did not convert to Islam until the 15th century, local historians claim that Chinese documents from 1370 mention a King called Ma-ho-mo-sa, who is believed to be Muhammad Shah, Brunei's first Islamic monarch, shows that Islam had reached the royal house by then.

Bruneian historians claim that the impact of Islam developed rapidly after Sultan Muhammad Shah's conversion, suggesting two waves of Islamisation: one through early travelers and the other through the Sultan's conversion. Arab immigrant Sheikh Syarif Ali (later Sultan Sharif Ali), a descendent of Prophet Muhammad, who came from Taif and wed Sultan Ahmad's daughter, had a great impact on the spread of Islam in Brunei. He promoted Islam in Java, where he tried to win over the Majapahit King, as well as in Brunei, where he constructed a mosque and gave Friday lectures. Islam was carried throughout Borneo and into the southern Philippines by him and other sultans. Brunei had solidified Islam by the 16th century, and Islamic components were incorporated into its legislation.

Brunei society saw a number of significant changes around the turn of the 18th century. With a strong and skilled sultan, the nation looked to the future with hope, despite its modest population of 12,000 to 25,000. The sultan prudently placed Brunei under British protection in 1888 and 1905/1906, guaranteeing political stability. This choice, together with administrative and economic reforms, improved socioeconomic conditions and made it possible for more Bruneians to travel to Mecca. The sultan's position in the sultanate was further cemented when he emerged as a key figure in Islam's religion. Abdul Mokti Nasar's prolonged stay in Mecca serves as an example of Brunei's involvement in Islamic scholarship during this time. He gained a deeper understanding of Islam and mastered Arabic during his stay in Mecca, which prepared him for a significant role in Brunei's religious and educational life after his return. The continued religious growth in Brunei was also distinguished by the spread of Sufi tariga orders like Khalwatiyya and Shadhiliyah, however further research is required to determine their precise impact.

Foreign Islamic missionaries remained active in Brunei during the majority of the 19th and early 20th centuries. These missionaries originated from the Patani Kingdom in southern Thailand as well as the nearby Borneo regions of Sultanate of Sambas and Sarawak. Students in Brunei studied and analysed popular books written in the 19th century by religious intellectuals from the Sambas sultanate, such Sheikh Ahmad Khatib (1860–1916). Abdul Mokti and Dato Ahmad Banjar were two of Khatib's students from Brunei. According to their writings, man's assimilation of religious ideas and lessons makes the will of Allah visible in addition to mystical deeds. A substantial portion of Brunei's legal system dates back to the 19th century and is derived on English common law customs.

Following this, Islam fluctuated in popularity in Brunei, a country that was devastated by incursions from Rajah of Sarawak, a nearby province, and lost a large portion of its land. The 19th century British intervention in Brunei contributed to its stabilisation and preservation. As a British protectorate, Brunei accepted military defence from the British in 1888 in return for allowing colonial influence. A British Residency system that was implemented in 1906 increased Britain's influence over the Sultan. The Sultan was required to abide by the British resident's administrative recommendations, with the exception of subjects pertaining to Islam. Unintentionally, this strategy served to strengthen the sultan's position as the protector of Islam, which had been severely undermined by colonialism. Brunei Town (present day Bandar Seri Begawan), the capital of Brunei, had just one mosque in 1906, and it was in terrible shape.

A set of Sharia laws known as the Mohammedan Enactments were created in 1912 and 1913, shortly after the British residency system was formed, to govern civil concerns pertaining to marriage, family, and inheritance. Brunei's economy had an enormous boom in 1929 after the discovery of the Seria oil field. By sponsoring the building of mosques, financing religious study, and promoting Islamic practice broadly, this new wealth helped bring Islam back to life. Nevertheless, during World War II, Japanese occupation of Brunei in 1941 and held it until 1945, overthrowing the British government, upsetting the nation's newly acquired prosperity and stability. The Mohammedan Religious Council was established in 1948. The council, led by the nation's Pengiran Bendahara, assumed responsibility for advising the sultan on questions of religion.

=== Sultan Omar Ali Saifuddien III (1950–1967) ===
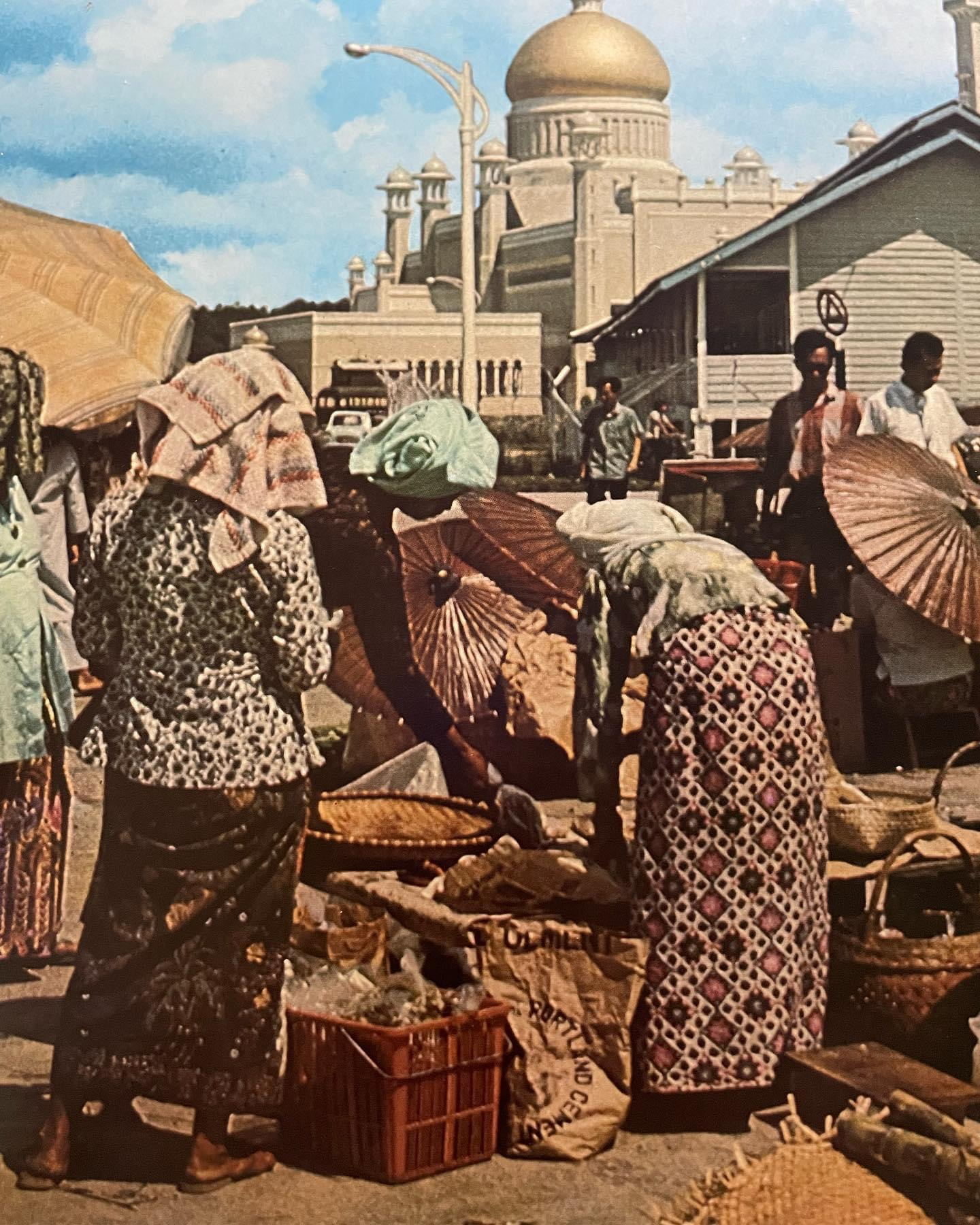
Bruneian Malays trading in Brunei Town in 1968

The Islamic government underwent a significant overhaul and bureaucratisation after 1950. In the current setup, the head of state and head of religion are the same person—the Sultan, who also serves as Prime Minister. Sultan Omar Ali Saifuddin III was crowned head of state by the British in 1950. He built the Omar Ali Saifuddien Mosque in Brunei Town, using around 10% of the first national development budget during his rule. Later, he invited Ismail Omar Abdul Aziz and the Chief Inspector of Religious Schools of Johor, Tuan Haji Othman bin Haji Mohammad, to examine the plan to open a religious school in Brunei in 1955. After conducting an examination, the half-hour of weekly religious teaching offered in both Malay and English schools in Brunei was found to be inadequate. It goes without saying that the Sultan approved the establishment of Brunei's first religious school in September 1956 as a consequence of this open examination.

In 1955, the Mohammedan Enactments underwent revisions. For example, a person who wanted a divorce would file for it with the Sharia courts, which deal with disputes pertaining to both religious offences and personal status. Islam was formally recognised as Brunei's official religion under the 1959 Constitution of Brunei. An elite group of people who attended Al-Azhar University in Egypt and Madrasah Aljunied Al-Islamiah in Singapore began to hold significant governmental posts in Brunei in the mid-1960s. This trio, which comprised Pehin Abdul Aziz Juned Pehin Badruddin Othman, and Pehin Zain Serudin, provided religious leadership in the sultanate.

One of the immediate outcomes of the Sultan's religious education program was the training of students who completed seven grades to become local religious educators. The "trained religious teachers" needed to pass a test and show up for weekly classes before they could be called "untrained teachers." On 22 May 1966, five days a week for a year, evening religious training programs were introduced to help them develop their skills and become fully qualified "Trained Religious Teachers." During his seventeen-year reign, Brunei rapidly developed through national initiatives that improved living standards and promoted Islam by building mosques, suraus, religious halls, government offices, and schools nationwide.

Sultan Omar Ali Saifuddien III's advocacy of Ahlus Sunnah Wal Jama'ah, an Islamic philosophy, was essential in fortifying Islam in Brunei. His efforts were most noticeable in the field of religious education, as he founded Arabic schools, built religious schools and a college for religious instructors, and ordered that religious themes be taught in schools. He also instituted religious seminars for older folks, sent residents overseas to study Islam, and promoted Quran reading competitions. A peaceful Muslim state, Brunei was brought together under the philosophy and the Shafi'i school of Fiqh by the efforts of the Sultan. The country's peaceful society and aspiration to become a "Negara Zikir" were made possible by this togetherness.

=== Sultan Hassanal Bolkiah (1967–present) ===
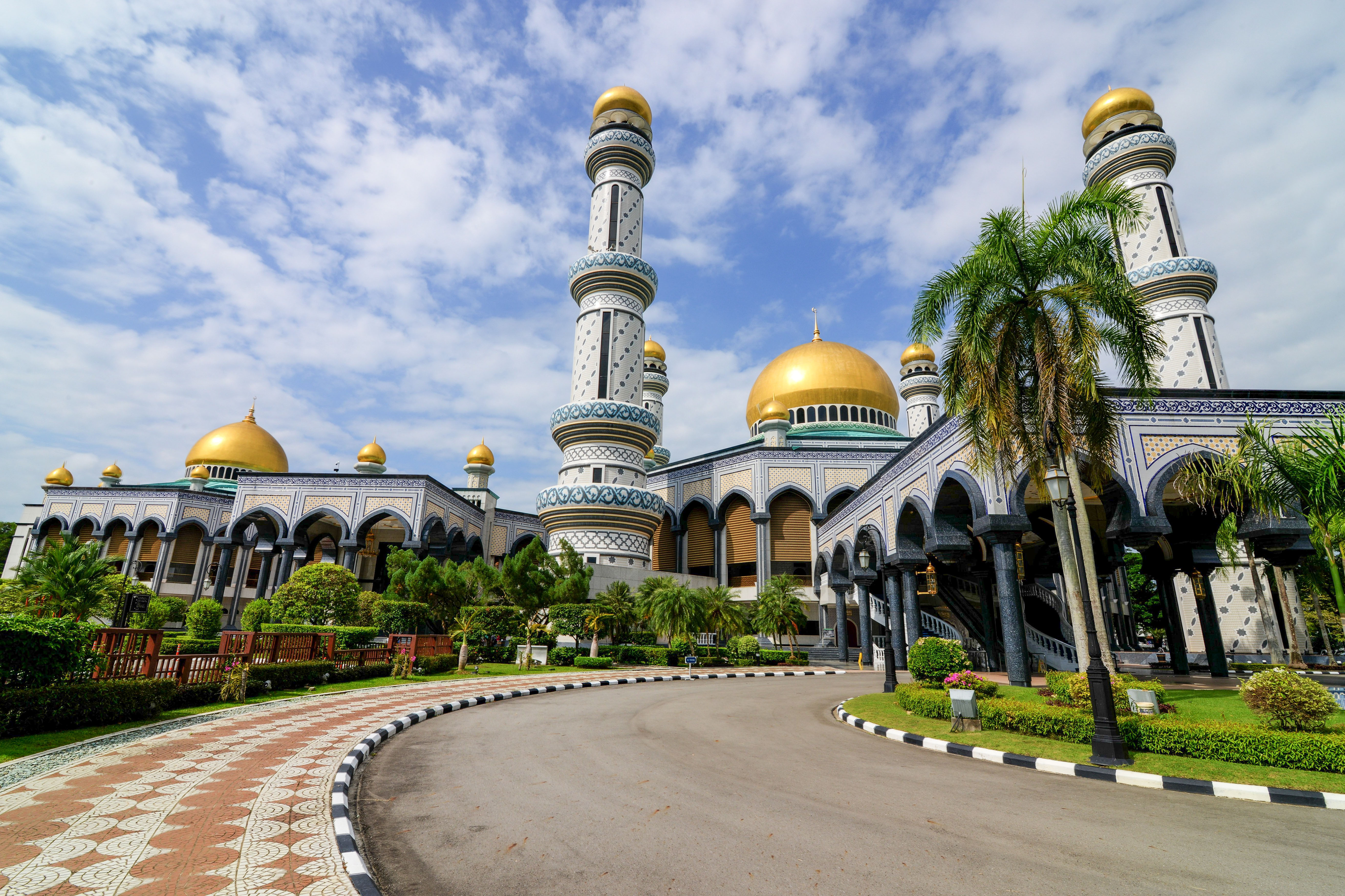
Jame' Asr Hassanil Bolkiah Mosque in 2014

In 1967, Sultan Hassanal Bolkiah assumed the throne and expedited the process of fortifying Islamic customs in Brunei. His ambition to increase his base of authority as well as his own religious passion drove this campaign. Large sums of money were spent on numerous Muslim programs as the nation continued to amass significant income from oil in the late 20th and early 21st centuries. Brunei used its oil wealth to support Islamic education in addition to building lavish mosques and enabling religious pilgrimages to Mecca and other religious events. The state established and extended a variety of higher Islamic educational institutions in an effort to produce a large number of Islamic scholars.

Following Brunei's independence in 1984, the Sultan committed enormous resources to the sultanate's Islamic development. In addition to creating the Sultan Haji Hassanal Bolkiah Foundation in 1992 to support secular and religious studies, he constructed ornate mosques. He not only gave financial backing to Islamic projects but also started to steer the sultanate toward a stricter interpretation of Islam. He repressed reformism and promoted a fundamentalist interpretation of Islam connected to the Melayu Islam Beraja (MIB) through the state-run media and educational system.

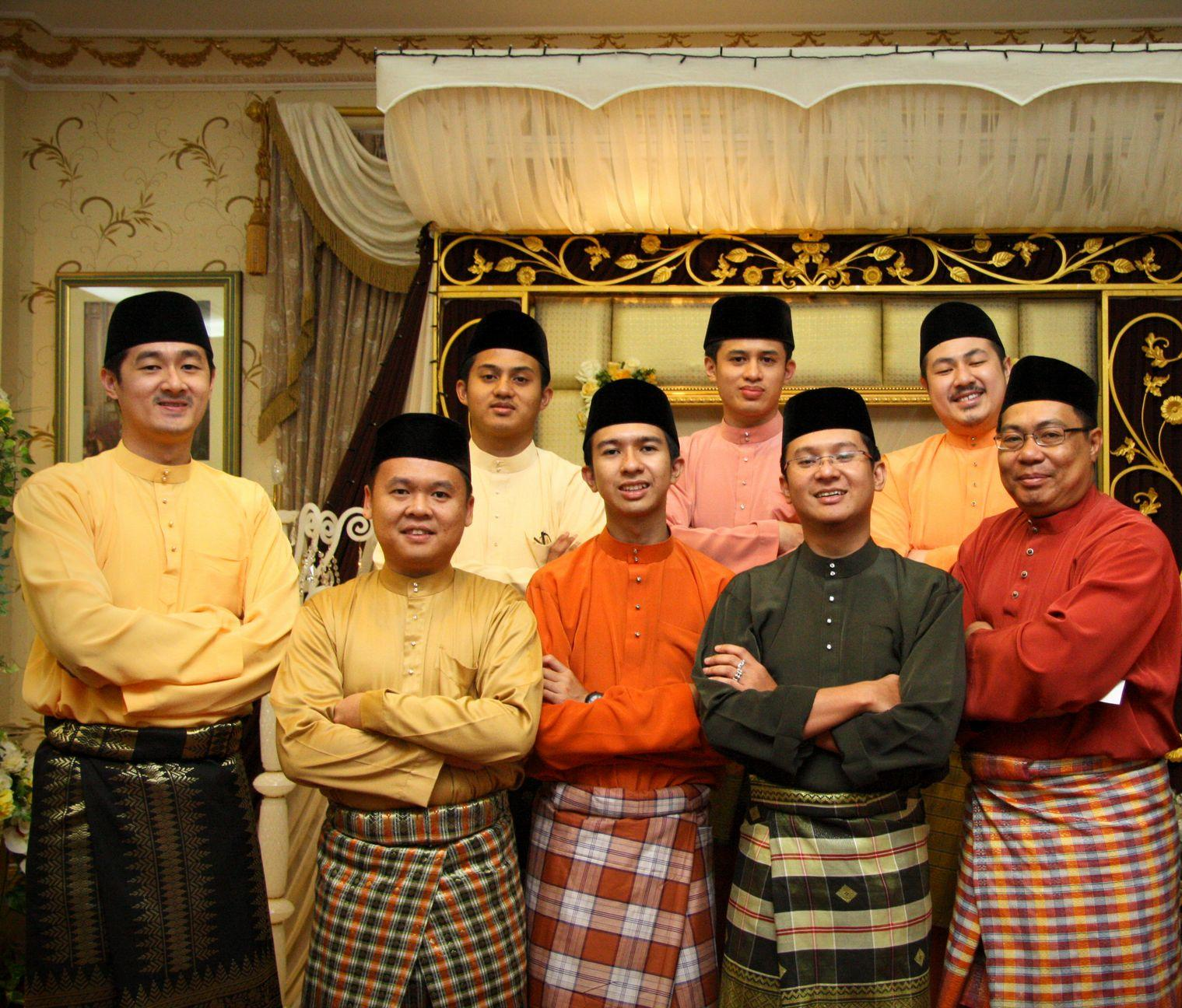
Brunei Malays wearing traditional Baju Melayu in 2012

The day-to-day management of religious affairs is within the purview of the Ministry of Religious Affairs, which was established on 1 January 1986, two years after Brunei attained independence. A State Mufti is appointed by the Prime Minister's Office to issue religious decrees in the interim. In Brunei, where religious enthusiasm is growing, the function of the mufti is quite evident. The mufti defends a number of religious bans, including the prohibition against alcohol.

Unambiguously speaking, the Sultan stated on 15 July 1996, that it was divinely mandated to create an Islamic Criminal Law Act. Additionally, he assigned a working group of Sharia experts, including a professor from Pakistan, to investigate the issue. Changes among the monarch's religious advisors corresponded with a greater focus on the Islamic penal code. He designated Mahmud Saedon as a special Islamic law expert in 1994. In a paper released in 1996, Mahmud Saedon proposed that Brunei do away with its dual legal system and replace it with a single Sharia framework that included an Islamic criminal code, as it was believed to have done in pre-colonial Brunei.

Despite Mahmud Saedon's passing in 2002, the Islamic Da'wah Center republished the work in English in 2008, the same year that the concept of hudud laws gained traction. His "visionary" paper was undoubtedly crucial in laying the groundwork for the Syariah Penal Code Order's (SPCO) implementation two decades later, and as such, pro-MIB academics and local media have consistently referenced it since 2013. Then State Mufti Abdul Aziz Juned had a major role in creating the SPCO's drafts, was among the other Islamic bureaucratic elites who had long harbored desires for the organization. Abdul Aziz Juned has also advocated for strict obedience to Sharia law, the Islamic religious code, in 2009 and again in 2012. This includes when it comes to concerns related to criminal crimes. In response, the Sultan said in 2009 and again in 2012 that Sharia law will soon be fully incorporated into civil and criminal law.

On 30 April 2014, Sultan Hassanal Bolkiah announced the implementation and enforcement of the first phase of Syariah Penal Code Law in Brunei starting 1 May 2014. With effect from April 2019, The Sultan's legislation imposing the death penalty by stoning for homosexuality and adultery sparked protests around the world and calls for boycotting companies owned by the Bruneian royal family, especially the Dorchester Collection hotels. This came after a Sharia law penal code was put into place in 2014 and included severe penalties like flogging, stoning, and limb amputation for offences like abortion, adultery, and same-sex acts. The government proceeded with a second phase in 2019 that said that anybody who insulted the prophet Muhammad would face execution by stoning.

== Demographics ==
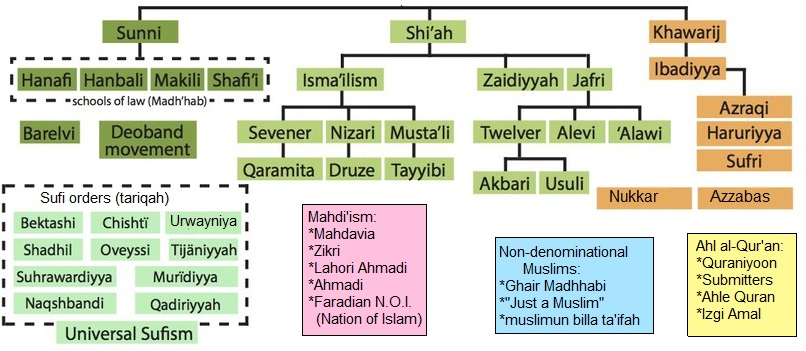
List of Islamic denominations of which Shafi'i Sunni is the most common in Brunei.

In 2017, it was reported that the traditional Islamic theology currently taught in government schools is gradually being shifted to a view of theology derived from the Middle East, particularly Saudi Arabia. There were 362,035 Sunni Muslims in Brunei as of 2021—190,314 men and 171,721 women. 193 people converted to Islam in Brunei–Muara District, 78 in Belait District, 112 in Tutong District, and 15 in Temburong District in 2023. The number of Bruneian converts to Islam has increased ever since Islam became the official religion of the country in 1954. And by 2004, it was recorded that over 16,000 Bruneians had converted to Islam. From 2009 to 2020, there have been 5,884 individuals who have converted to Islam in Brunei.

Conversions by District
District	2009	2010	2011	2012	2013	2014	2015	2016	2017	2018	2019	2020
Brunei Muara	234	281	260	269	256	300	245	242	203	204	152	218
Belait	153	161	115	94	124	130	94	110	67	74	109	77
Tutong	125	175	124	88	129	132	130	102	112	104	64	125
Temburong	21	25	37	18	29	23	45	18	27	22	22	16
Total:	533	642	536	469	537	585	514	472	409	404	347	436

Conversions By Ethnicity
Ethnicity	2009	2010	2011	2012	2013	2014	2015	2016	2017	2018	2019	2020
Dusun	151	154	131	103	149	164	141	122	108	110	102	122
Murut	14	20	11	14	10	7	12	12	4	13	4	13
Iban	173	208	149	136	130	139	134	115	109	99	111	118
Chinese	61	74	63	58	80	78	66	75	60	70	47	74
Other	134	186	182	158	168	197	161	148	128	112	83	109
Total:	533	642	536	469	537	585	514	472	409	404	347	436

The Brunei government has strict policies against other Islamic sects, including a complete ban on Shia Islam, allegedly to "avoid violence between the two faiths that has sometimes broken out in other parts of the world by promoting only the Sunni faith", but more realistically due to Anti-Shi'ism. Muslims who believe Mirza Ghulam Ahmad to be the fulfilment of the Islamic prophecies concerning the return of Jesus, the Ahmadiyya, are also present. There are approximately 500 Ahmadis in the country.

== Mosques ==
As of 2005, the sultanate is home to around 140 mosques and prayer halls, the most of which were constructed via official donations. The two state mosques at Bandar Seri Begawan, the nation's capital, stand out in particular. Built at great expenditure by the sultans, they are remarkable architectural structures with enormous domes and other embellishments. Sultan Hassanal Bolkiah constructed the green-domed mosque Jame' Asr Hassanil Bolkiah Mosque in 1992, while Sultan Omar Ali Saifuddin III, his father, completed the Omar Ali Saifuddien Mosque in 1958. Both were built to demonstrate the devotion of the general public's religion. The state has constructed a large number of mosques during the 1960s as part of its five-year National Development Plans (RKN). The Ash-Shaliheen Mosque is the only mosque in Brunei constructed in the Moroccan architecture. Egyptian architect Abdel-Wahed El-Wakil, designed the mosque as a haven of spiritual significance.

When attending a mosque in Brunei, dress modestly. Women should wear long sleeves and a hijab, and males should wear long sleeves as well. Don't bring food or beverages inside, and be sure you take off your shoes before you go in. Keep quiet, turn off electronics, and keep a tight eye on kids to make sure they behave quietly. When taking photos, turn off the flash and refrain from capturing individuals in prayer or engaging in other religious observances without permission. However, it is usually allowed to take images of the mosque's exterior and grounds.

== See also ==
- Malay Islamic identity
- Freedom of religion in Brunei
