= Human rights in Brunei =

Brunei is an absolute monarchy presided over by Sultan Haji Hassanal Bolkiah since 1967. Emergency powers in place since 1962 have allowed the sultan to govern almost unhindered. The Legislative Council, which consists of appointed, indirectly elected, and ex officio members, meets regularly throughout the year and serves solely as an advisory body for the purpose of proposing and approving laws and spending plans. The Royal Brunei Police Force (RBPF) and the Internal Security Department (ISD), which are overseen by the Prime Minister's Office and the Ministry of Home Affairs respectively, are in charge of maintaining order and enforcing the law in the nation.

Independent monitoring of the human rights situation is hindered due to a lack of transparency. As of 2018, proposed changes to the Syariah (Sharia) Penal Code would allow for the use of the death sentence as well as physical punishment for a variety of offenses, including caning and stoning, which constitute torture. The revisions would discriminate against women and significantly restrict people's freedoms of thought, conscience, and religion.

== Legislation ==
=== Syariah penal code ===
On 3 April 2019, Brunei's Syariah Criminal Code (2013) entered into force. The new legislation discriminates against the nation's most vulnerable groups, including children, women, and religious and sexual minorities, and seriously jeopardizes fundamental human rights. Many aspects of the code go against Brunei's commitments to customary international law as well as international human rights accords to which Brunei is a party. Brunei is a signatory to both the Convention on the Elimination of All Forms of Discrimination Against Women and the Convention on the Rights of the Child (CEDAW). Brunei has signed the Convention against Torture and Other Cruel, Inhuman or Degrading Treatment or Punishment, but has not yet ratified it. As a United Nations member, Brunei has vowed to uphold the principles of the Universal Declaration of Human Rights, which are thought to be representative of accepted international law.

=== Anti-trafficking in persons order ===
The government of Brunei's law enforcement grew efforts to combat human trafficking. The 2019 Anti-Trafficking in Persons Order criminalized both sex trafficking and labor trafficking and prescribed penalties, which are considered to be sufficiently stringent. In addition, the government may have also used Chapter 120 Section 5 of the Women and Girls Prosecution Act to prosecute potential sex trafficking crimes. However, the number of suspected trafficking crimes referred for review and potential investigation decreased from 147 cases in 2020 to 134 cases in 2021.

== Basic rights ==
=== Freedom of speech ===
The constitution and legislation do not include any provisions for freedom of speech. Legislative Council members are allowed to "express their opinions freely" on behalf of the people, but they are not allowed to use language or act in ways that are "irresponsible, insulting, scandalous, or damaging." To question the authority of the royal family is against the law. Challenges against "the standing or importance of the national idea, the Malay Islamic Monarchy concept," are likewise prohibited by law. According to this theory, only monarchical rule can maintain the rights and privileges of the Brunei Malay race, and Islam is designated as the national religion. Any act, thing, or statement intended to incite "feelings of ill will or hatred" is likewise prohibited by law.

According to Reporters Without Borders (RSF), self-censorship is the norm for journalists in Brunei, which was placed 154th out of 180 nations in its press freedom ranking. For reporting that is judged false and malicious, officials have the power to shut down newspapers without justification, fine, and imprison journalists for up to three years. State-run television is the only outlet in Brunei. The Sultan's family runs Borneo Bulletin, the primary English-language daily newspaper in the nation, and many of its writers engage in self-censorship. The Scoop, an online publication that debuted in 2017, offers largely unbiased coverage of Bruneian politics and society.

Shahiran Sheriffudin bin Shahrani Muhammad, a government employee, was demoted on July 27 and accused under Section 4(1)(c) of the Sedition Act for making remarks on Facebook that the Ministry of Religious Affairs found "offensive." For fear of legal repercussions, journalists and online activists continued to self-censor.

=== Freedom of assembly and movement ===
The government's emergency powers restrict the right to assemble in this country. Public gatherings of 10 or more people require a permit from the government, and police may disband unofficial assemblies of five or more people deemed likely to cause a disturbance of the peace. The government routinely issues permits for annual events, but occasionally disrupts politically or otherwise sensitive gatherings. The LGBTQI+ community reported that authorities broke up an event in late January for lack of a permit. Organizers of events on sensitive topics tend to hold meetings in private rather than apply for permits or practice self-censorship at public events.

Laws that have been in place for a long time restrict the right to assemble. Without a permit, no group of more than ten individuals may congregate for any reason, and these regulations are frequently upheld. An unofficial gathering of five or more people that the police believe to be likely to disturb the peace may be broken up by them. The Minister of Home Affairs must approve all permits. Traditionally, the government gave permits for yearly festivities, but in recent years, it has occasionally used this power to obstruct political rallies. Instead than requesting permission or engaging in self-censorship at public events, those in charge of organizing sensitive events frequently hold meetings in private.

The law does not allow for freedom of association, and formal groups are required to register with the Registrar of Societies and provide reports on their activities. The government may suspend the activities of registered organizations if it deems it in the public interest. Organizations seeking to raise funds or donations from the public require permission from the Ministry of Home Affairs and individual permits for each fundraising activity. The government accepts most applications for forming associations, but applicants are subject to background checks and naming requirements. Approved organizations deal with matters such as pollution, wildlife preservation, arts, entrepreneurship, and women in business.

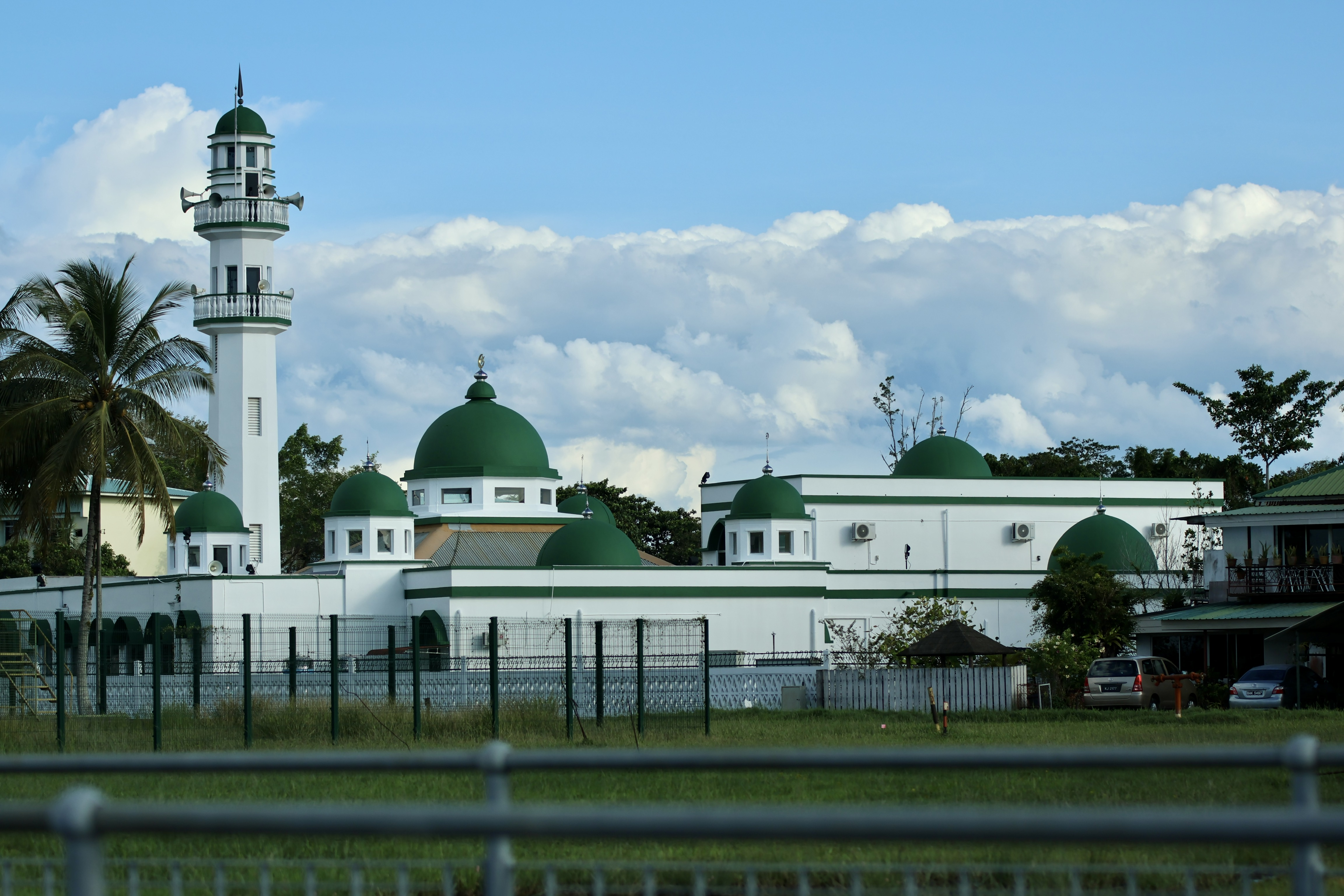
Pekan Seria Mosque

=== Freedom of religion ===
The official religion in Brunei is Sunni Islam, but the constitution allows for the peaceful practice of all religions. The government enforces Sharia law, which includes corporal and capital punishments for offenses such as apostasy and blasphemy, although no capital punishments have been enforced since 1957. The government permits non-Muslim religious minorities to practice their faiths but bans religious groups it considers "deviant." All places of worship were closed due to COVID-19, and non-Islamic places of worship were not officially informed of the closure. The government has not ratified the United Nations Convention Against Torture. Non-Muslims continue to face restrictions on their ability to proselytize, and in one case, a Bible was confiscated by custom officials but could be reclaimed with written approval from various government departments.

The government kept up its long-standing efforts to discourage other religions and support the Shafii school of Sunni Islam. Religious organizations that did not follow the Shafii school of Sunni Islam were subject to laws and regulations. Throughout 2012, there was little change in the pattern of how much the government respected religious freedom. On the basis of religion affiliation, belief, or practice, there have been some reports of social abuses or prejudice. Religious groups in the nation largely coexisted harmoniously.

=== Political freedoms ===
The country is ruled by the sultan through hereditary birthright, and citizens have no ability to choose their government. Emergency powers have been in place since 1962, renewed every two years by the sultan. The Legislative Council has little independent power and primarily provides a forum for public discussion of proposed government programs, budgets, and administrative deficiencies. Village consultative council elections allow voting by secret ballot for persons age 18 and older, but candidates must be Muslim, approved by the Ministry of Home Affairs, and have been a citizen or permanent resident for more than 15 years. The only registered political party, the National Development Party, pledges support for the sultan and government and makes no criticisms of the government.

== Children's rights ==
The father or, after an application process, the mother is the source of citizenship. Birth within the borders of the nation does not confer citizenship. Every birth is recorded, and boys and girls are treated equally. A special pass must be applied for by stateless parents if their child is born here. It is against the law to fail to record a birth, and doing so afterwards makes it challenging to enroll the child in school. Although child abuse is illegal, it does not seem to be a common occurrence. A dedicated unit for investigating crimes involving women and children is part of the RBPF, and the Ministry of Culture, Youth, and Sports offered victims' refuge and care.

The legal minimum age for marriage in Brunei is 14 years and seven months with parental and participant consent, unless religious or custom laws set a higher minimum age. The Islamic Family Act sets the minimum age at 16 for Muslim girls and 18 for Muslim men, and it is an offense to force someone to marry against their will. Ethnic Chinese must be 15 or older to marry, and sexual intercourse with an ethnic Chinese girl younger than 15 is considered rape even if with her spouse. Marriages involving minors are rare and generally prohibited by social custom. Sexual activity with a girl under the age of 14 is rape and is punishable by imprisonment for up to 30 years and a minimum of 12 canings, according to the law. The law protects women, girls, and boys from being used for prostitution and "other immoral objectives," such as pornography, that involve commercial sexual exploitation. To pursue the rape of male youngsters, the government used the statute prohibiting "carnal intercourse against the order of nature." Outside of marriage, consenting adults must be at least 16 years old.

According to Datin Paduka Hajah Norlida binti Dato Paduka Haji Abdul Jalil, Permanent Secretary of the Ministry of Culture, Youth, and Sports of Brunei, since the country's initial evaluation in 2003, a number of efforts have been made that have raised Brunei Darussalam's level of compliance with the Convention's requirements. A number of the Committee's recommendations had been adopted, while others had made progress. By the end of August 2015, Brunei had revoked its objections to Article 20's subparagraphs 1 and 2 and Article 21's subparagraph (a). Article 14, Article 20 (3), and Article 21 (b-e), as well as other sections of the Convention that would be incompatible with Islam, the official religion of Brunei, continue to be subject to reservations. They expressed optimism that all youngsters would marry at age 18 and that flogging and corporal punishment would be prohibited in all settings. Specialists discussed issues such child labor, unfavorable gender stereotypes, female genital mutilation, public and religious education, and the juvenile justice system. Brunei was lauded for having high levels of literacy and education. The experts were interested in learning more about alternative care and foster systems, adoption practices, the prevalence of obesity and measures taken to address the issue, as well as the possibility of performing abortions.

== Women's rights ==
Secular law provides imprisonment and caning as punishment for rape, while the Sharia Penal Code provides stoning to death as the maximum punishment. The law does not criminalize rape against men or spousal rape, and sexual intercourse by a man with his wife is not considered rape as long as she is not younger than 14 (15 for ethnic Chinese women). There is no specific domestic violence law, but authorities can arrest individuals under the law related to the protection of women and girls. The penalty for domestic violence ranges from one to two weeks in jail and a fine for minor assault to caning and a longer prison sentence for serious injury. Islamic family law provides protection against spousal abuse and allows for the granting of protection orders, with the penalty for violating a protection order being a significant fine, imprisonment of up to six months, or both.

Amendments to the Shari'a Penal Code included clauses that, if put into effect, would further discriminate against women, including by making unmarried Muslim women live in their guardian's house and criminalizing pregnancy outside of marriage.

== Disability rights ==
The law in this country does not require accessibility or prohibit discrimination against people with disabilities in most public services, including access to buildings, transportation, and communications. However, inclusive educational services are provided for disabled children in government and religious schools. The government also provides outreach programs and a monthly disability allowance for children under 15. NGOs work to supplement government services. The government introduced alternative payment methods to ensure people with disabilities received their allowance during the COVID-19 pandemic. Access to the judiciary for people with disabilities is not specifically addressed. All individuals, regardless of disability, have the same rights and access to healthcare.

== Trafficking in persons ==
Foreign workers, mainly from Indonesia, the Philippines, Bangladesh, and China, are vulnerable to exploitation by human traffickers in Brunei. Traffickers use various methods such as debt-based coercion, non-payment of wages, passport confiscation, and physical abuse to exploit migrant workers. Some female migrants arriving on tourist visas may also be forced into sex trafficking, while trafficking victims in Malaysia or Indonesia may transit through Brunei. Anti-LGBTQI+ laws also increase the risk of extortion and psychological coercion for LGBTQI+ individuals, who are already at higher risk of trafficking. Experts working on anti-trafficking efforts in Brunei are also subject to threats from traffickers.

=== Prosecution ===
Courts did not convict any traffickers in Brunei for the fifth consecutive year. The government required proof of physical force, fraud, or physical coercion to investigate a trafficking crime, and did not investigate cases in which the alleged traffickers used non-physical coercion. An overreliance on victim testimony and lack of special investigative measures to corroborate evidence resulted in cases being investigated and prosecuted under non-trafficking statutes. The government lacked understanding of the pervasiveness of trafficking and labor-related indicators, hindering anti-trafficking efforts. The government did not investigate all alleged potential trafficking crimes and focused on crimes committed by foreign perpetrators rather than Bruneian criminals. The Brunei government did not report any investigations, prosecutions, or convictions of government employees involved in human trafficking, but corruption and official complicity in trafficking crimes remained significant concerns. The government prosecuted officials involved in visa fraud but did not cooperate with foreign governments on domestic trafficking prosecutions involving foreign nationals.

=== Protection ===
The government of Brunei decreased its efforts to protect victims of human trafficking. Despite having standard operating procedures (SOPs) for victim identification, referral, and protection, the government did not report identifying any trafficking victims for the second year in a row. The SOPs also did not adequately screen for trafficking indicators among LGBTQI+ individuals or adults arrested for involvement in commercial sex. The government reportedly prosecuted potential trafficking victims and sentenced them for immigration violations, and deported foreign workers whose Bruneian employers withheld wages or medical care. These practices perpetuated fear among victims and led to significant identification and service provision gaps. Observers called for a formal communication mechanism between foreign government embassies and the Bruneian government to increase collaboration on reports of suspected trafficking crimes.

=== Prevention ===
The Brunei government decreased efforts to prevent trafficking. They have an interagency anti-trafficking committee that meets quarterly and are implementing their National Action Plan developed in November 2020. However, the labor department did not issue guidelines on the prohibition of charging fees, remuneration, profit, or compensation by recruitment agents, and there was no oversight of this provision. The Bruneian government requires foreign workers to sign their contracts in front of a labor officer to prevent forgery and ensure compliance with the law. However, all contracts are written in the same format and do not provide specific details based on the workers' employment or position descriptions. The government did not ensure that contracts were in workers' primary languages or that they retained copies of their contracts. The government also did not adequately enforce laws prohibiting employers from withholding wages or retaining employees' passports. The COVID-19 pandemic hindered the government's ability to conduct anti-trafficking roadshows and awareness campaigns, but a government-owned media outlet continued to publish articles on trafficking and labor rights.

== Indigenous people's rights ==
Seven indigenous Malay groups—Belait, Bisaya, Brunei, Dusun (Brunei), Kedayan, Murut or Tutong—are listed as automatically qualifying for citizenship in the Brunei Nationality Act of 1961. Elsewhere, it lists an additional 15 communities which are also considered to be indigenous to Brunei: Dayaks (sea), Dayaks (land), Kalabits, Kayans, Kenyahs (including Sabups and Sipengs), Kajangs (including Sekapans, Kejamans, Lahanans, Punans, Tajongs and Kanowits), Lugats, Lisums, Melanaus, Penans, Sians, Tagals, Tabuns and Ukits. Despite being acknowledged as indigenous here, they are not automatically given citizenship. The standards they must meet are more stringent, whereas having a father who is a member of one of the seven indigenous "Malay" communities is enough to immediately provide citizenship.

== Capital and corporal punishment ==
Despite being abolitionist in theory, hanging remained a common punishment for a number of crimes, including homicide, terrorism, and offenses involving drugs. Amendments to the Penal Code, if put into effect during phase three, would make crimes like adultery, sodomy, and rape punishable by death by stoning. Both Muslims and non-Muslims who engage in adultery with a Muslim would be sentenced to death by stoning or 100 lashes, depending on the offender's marital status.

While there is no indication that same-sex legislation have been enforced recently, there are claims that the law that makes the expression of gender identification illegal is sometimes followed. After worldwide criticism, Brunei stated in 2019 that the ban on the death sentence would be extended to include the new rules under the 2013 Syariah Criminal Code Order. In recent years, there have been instances of discrimination against LGBT persons, including harassment, threats, and challenges getting access to fundamental rights and services. In response to these reports, the Bruneian government announced that it will adopt the UN Convention Against Torture and continue to oppose the use of the death penalty, especially under the country's recently passed Syariah Criminal Code Order (UNCAT).

== Worker rights ==
Workers have the legal right to form and join unions, but unions are subject to significant oversight by the Registrar of Trade Unions. The law prohibits collective bargaining and strikes, and there were no unions or worker organizations in the country. Unions must register with the government and are subject to the same laws as other organizations, with penalties for non-registration. The law prohibits affiliation with international labor organizations without government consent and restricts the use of union funds. The law requires union officers to be bona fide, and penalties for violating union laws include fines and imprisonment. NGOs operate in labor issues but practice self-censorship to avoid confrontation with the government.

According to data from the Employers/Employees Census 2017 released by the Labour Department, there are a total of 25,211 workers in the construction business alone, made up of 22,510 foreigners, 2,141 locals, and 560 permanent residents. The information is relevant to a total of 1,777 active business entities in Brunei's construction sector.

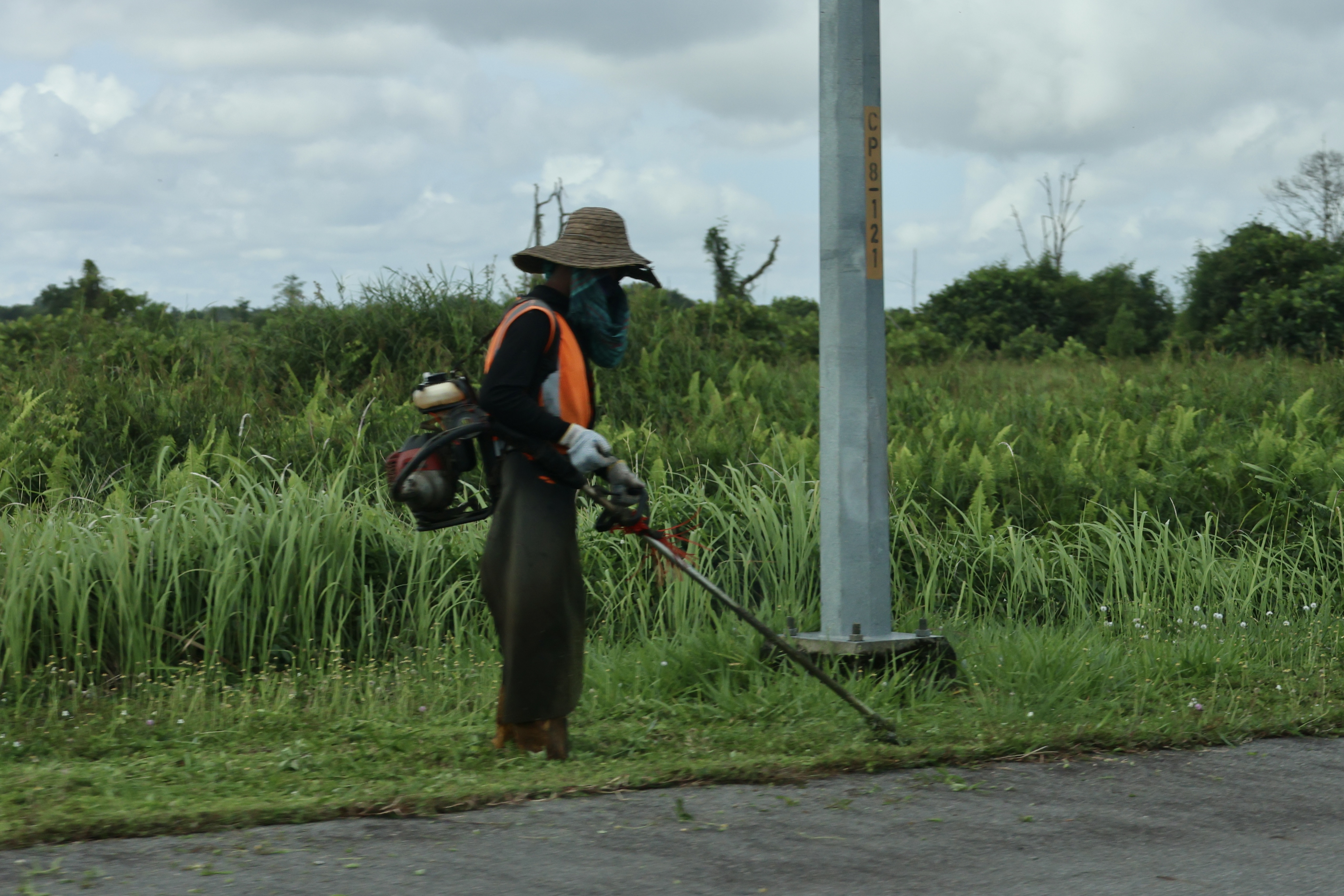
Foreign worker under the Public Works Department (JKR).

=== Forced or compulsory labor ===
The law prohibits all forms of forced or compulsory labor, but the government did not effectively enforce the law, and forced labor occurred. Convictions for forced labor could lead to penalties, but most cases were settled out of court, and penalties were seldom applied. The government established an interagency committee to counter human trafficking. However, the government did not effectively investigate cases of debt bondage or forced labor. Some foreign migrant workers faced involuntary servitude, debt bondage, nonpayment of wages, abusive employers, or confinement to the home, and some employers withheld wages to recoup labor broker or recruitment fees. The sultan conducted a surprise inspection of the Immigration and Labor Departments due to concerns over the trustworthiness and efficiency of both departments. He raised concerns about a syndicate selling fake national identification cards and suggested that immigration officials may have been involved. The sultan also attributed the uncontrolled influx of foreign labor to government mismanagement in issuing employee visas, making a rare explicit reference to Bangladeshi workers.

=== Discrimination ===
The law does not have explicit provisions to prevent employment and occupational discrimination. Equal pay for equal work is also not required by law. Women are restricted from serving in certain military combat roles, and ethnic origin is a limiting factor in certain government positions and military roles. Public and private employers showed hiring biases against foreign workers, and LGBTI job applicants sometimes faced discrimination. The government implemented initiatives to increase awareness of sexual harassment in the workplace. Some foreign workers received lower wages based on national origin.

== Rights of persons under arrest ==
Except in cases when police are unable to get an endorsement in time to stop a suspect from fleeing or when a suspect is caught committing a crime, a magistrate must endorse a warrant for arrest. After an arrest, police may hold a suspect for up to 48 hours while they conduct an investigation before taking him or her in front of a magistrate or sharia court. Enforcement bodies under both secular and sharia law recognized and upheld this right. No access to detained people throughout the 48-hour investigation period was permitted at police stations, including for attorneys. Upon the agreement of a magistrate or sharia court, authorities may keep detainees longer than the original 48 hours.

According to reports, following a 48-hour investigation period, the authorities in a particular nation inform detainees of the charges brought against them and provide information about detainees. After this time, the police may, in rare circumstances, deny visitors admission. With the exception of capital charges, the legislation permits the judge's discretionary use of bail, but it makes no provision for indigent defendants to get free legal representation. In non-capital prosecutions, indigent defendants might have to represent themselves, however several NGOs offer pro bono legal services. Under the Internal Security Act, the government has the authority to detain or arrest individuals and hold them without charge for revolving two-year terms while also convening an advisory body to assess the detentions. In addition to secular law courts, sharia law is used, and a committee determines which type of courts should hear cases.

== Rights of persons on trial ==
The law does not clearly mention an independent judiciary, and the sultan, who serves as prime minister, and the crown prince, who serves as senior minister, both oversee the secular and sharia courts administratively. However, there were no recorded cases of government meddling with the judiciary, and the administration generally maintained judicial independence. All judges in the higher courts are appointed by the sultan and serve at his discretion in both legal systems.

Secular law in a certain country provides for the right to a fair, timely, and public trial, with defendants presumed innocent and given the right to counsel, to be informed of charges, and to confront accusers, cross-examine witnesses, present evidence, not testify, and appeal. Sharia procedures do not specifically provide for these rights, but defendants in sharia proceedings generally have the same rights as those in criminal cases under secular law. Sharia courts have jurisdiction in certain civil matters, but some sections of the law apply to all persons, regardless of religion. The Internal Security Act permits preventative detention in cases of subversion and organized violence, but detainees are entitled to make representation against detention orders to an advisory board, either personally or through an advocate or attorney.
