= Saifulrizal Abdul Latif =

Bruneian military officer

Brigadier General (Retired) Dato Seri Pahlawan Saifulrizal Abdul Latif PSPNB SMB
- سيف الرجال عبد اللطيف
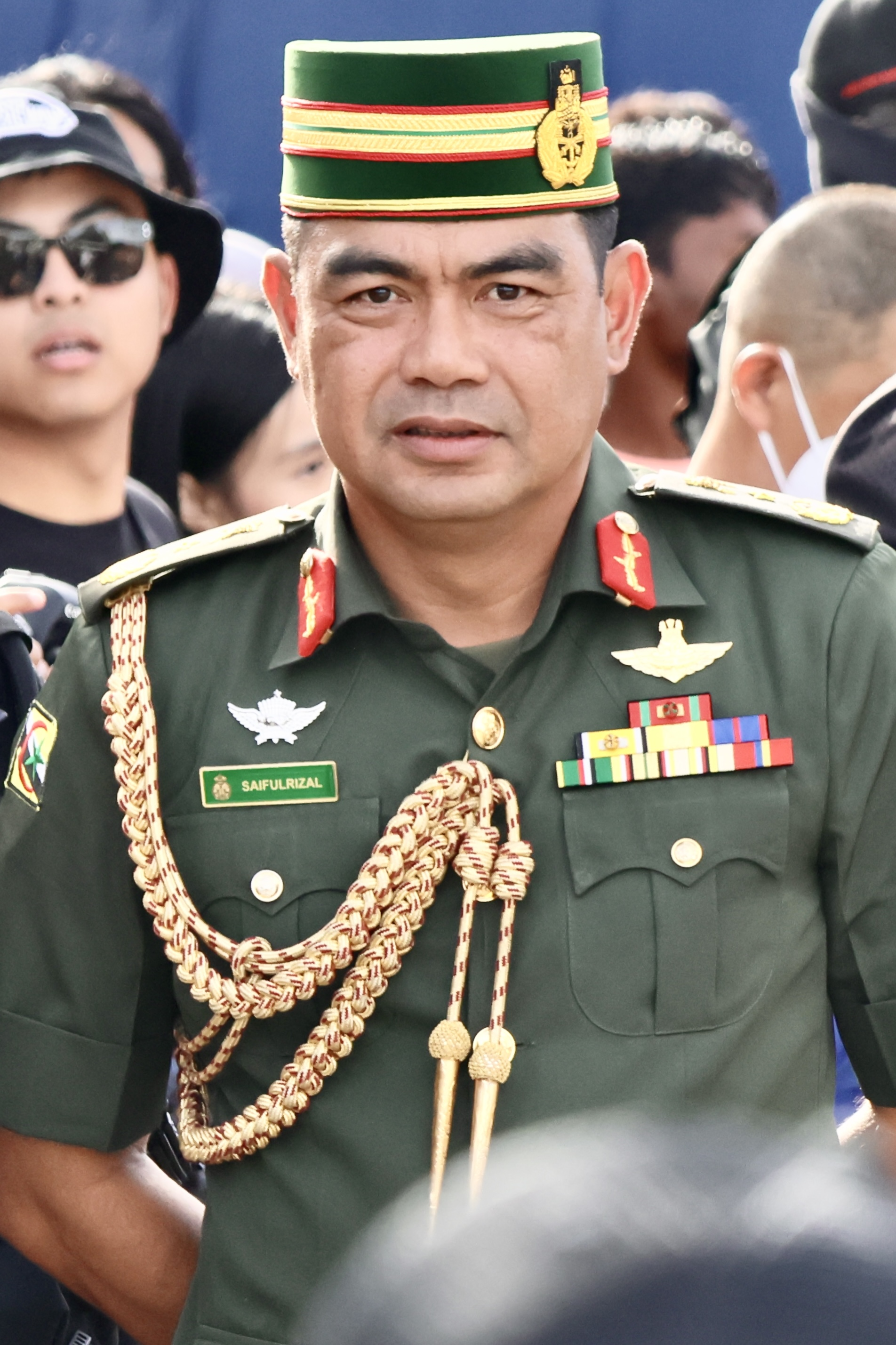
- Brigadier general Saifulrizal in 2023

13th Commander of the Royal Brunei Land Forces
- In office 10 June 2022 – 9 June 2023
- Monarch: Hassanal Bolkiah
- Deputy: Azman Bangkol; Muhammad Wata
- Preceded by: Abdul Razak
- Succeeded by: Shanonnizam Sulaiman

Personal details
- Born: Brunei
- Education: Royal Military Academy Sandhurst; Malaysian Armed Forces Defence College
- Profession: Military officer

Military service
- Allegiance: Brunei
- Branch/service: Royal Brunei Land Force
- Years of service: 1995–present
- Rank: Brigadier General
- Unit: Third Battalion RBLF; Special Combat Squadron
- Commands: Special Forces Regiment; Joint Force Headquarters; Royal Brunei Land Forces

Saifulrizal bin Abdul Latif is a retired Bruneian military officer who was the 13th Commander of the Royal Brunei Land Forces (RBLF) from 2022 to 2023.

== Education ==
After graduating from the Royal Military Academy Sandhurst (RMAS) in the United Kingdom, Saifulrizal joined the Royal Brunei Armed Forces (RBAF) on 24 November 1995 and was commissioned as a second lieutenant in 1997. He got the chance to take a variety of courses and seminars throughout his career, both domestically and overseas. The Malaysian Armed Forces Defence College from 2019 to 2020, the RBAF Executive Development Programme (EDP) in 2015, and the RBAF Command & Staff Course in 2011 were among the courses he took. The Republic of Korea Counter-Terrorist Course (707th Special Mission Battalion) in 2004, the Australian Grade 2 Command & Tactics Course in 2009, the Singapore Armed Forces Advanced Infantry Officer Training in 2008, and numerous other special operations courses.

== Military career ==
Saifulrizal has held numerous staff and command positions throughout his time in the military. Prior to being chosen for the Special Forces (SF) in 1998, he worked as a platoon leader with the Third Battalion RBLF upon his return to Brunei. He served as a Troop Leader in the Diving Troop Special Combat Squadron (SCS) from 1998 to 2002 after passing SF Selection. Thereafter, from 2002 to 2004, he served as the SCS Training Officer. In 2005, he was named the SCS Second-in-Command. In 2006, he was sent to the RBLF and given the position of commanding officer of the Third Battalion RBLF. Upon his return to the SF, he was named operations officer from 2009 to 2013, and from 2013 to 2016 he served as commanding officer of the Special Forces Regiment.

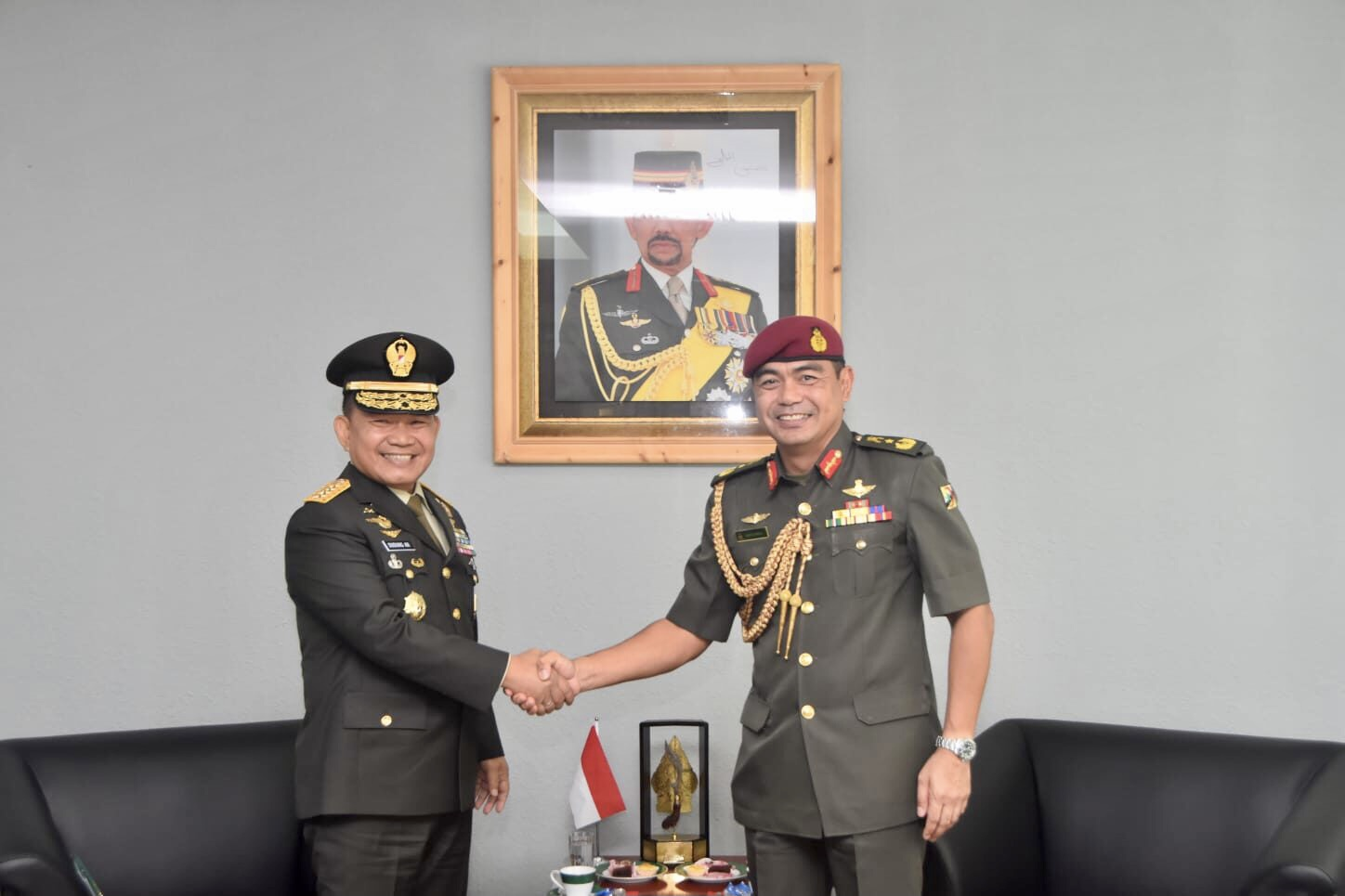
Gen. Dudung and Brig. Gen. Saifulrizal at Berakas Garison in 2023

Saifulrizal began working as the Sultan Hassanal Bolkiah's aide-de-camp in 2016 and held the position through 2019. His most recent positions were as the Deputy Joint Force Commander from January 2022 to June 2022 and as the chief of staff of the Joint Force Headquarters, RBAF from 2020 to 2022. From 10 June 2022, he has been the 13th Commander of the Royal Brunei Land Force. Two days later, Counsellor Derek Chollet visited Brunei from 12 to 13 June. During his brief visit, the Counsellor met with Saifulrizal, accompanied by Caryn McClelland.

He was promoted to the rank of brigadier general with effect from 17 June 2022, according to Sultan Hassanal Bolkiah's approval. At the Bolkiah Garrison Officer's Mess, the Commander of the Royal Brunei Armed Forces, Haszaimi Bol Hassan, concluded the promotion ceremony for Colonel Saifulrizal. The launching ceremony of Exercise Maju Bersama at Kranji Camp was co-officiated by Chief of Army Major general David Neo and Saifulrizal bin Abdul Latif, which would last from 21 to 30 November 2022.

The official handover and takeover ceremony between Brigadier General Saifulrizal and Brigadier General Mohammad Shanonnizam, took place on 9 June 2023 at the Parade Square, Berakas Garrison. The outgoing commander stressed in his farewell address, the roles and responsibilities of every member of the organization are essential to the function of national defense. He also emphasized the need for all RBLF individuals with this obligation to uphold discipline, excitement, sustainable leadership, strong readiness, and spiritual power in order to lead the RBLF to success in defending the monarchy, religion, and country's sovereignty.

== Personal life ==
Two sons and a girl have been born to Saifulrizal and his wife, Ampuan Datin Yura Kasumawati binti Dato Paduka Haji Mohd Adnan.

== Honours ==
National

- Order of Pahlawan Negara Brunei First Class (PSPNB; 15 July 2022) – Dato Seri Pahlawan
- Order of Seri Paduka Mahkota Brunei Third Class (SMB; 2017)
- Sultan of Brunei Golden Jubilee Medal (5 October 2017)
- General Service Medal (Armed Forces)
- Long Service Medal and Good Conduct (PKLPB)
- Royal Brunei Armed Forces Golden Jubilee Medal (31 May 2011)
- Royal Brunei Armed Forces Diamond Jubilee Medal (31 May 2021)

Foreign

- United Kingdom:
  - Recipient of the Sandhurst Medal

Military offices
Preceded by Abdul Razak	13th Commander of the Royal Brunei Land Forces; 10 June 2022 – 9 June 2023	Succeeded by Shanonnizam Sulaiman
