= Azman Bangkol =

Bruneian military officer

Colonel (Retired) Azman Bangkol SMB PJK
- عزمن بڠكول
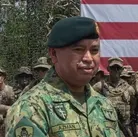
- Colonel Azman at Pahlawan Warrior 2022, Tutong Camp
- Born: Azman bin Haji Bangkol; Brunei
- Military career
- Allegiance: Brunei
- Branch: Royal Brunei Land Force
- Service years: 1993–2022
- Rank: Colonel
- Service number: 429
- Units: Second Battalion RBLF; International Monitoring Team; Joint Force Headquarters
- Commands: Chief of Staff of RBLF; Deputy Commander of the Royal Brunei Land Force

Azman bin Haji Bangkol is a former Bruneian military officer who served as the Deputy Commander of the Royal Brunei Land Force (RBLF) from 2020 to 2022. Additionally, he was among the contingent attached to the International Monitoring Team (IMT) in Mindanao. He has notably served as the deputy for three RBLF commanders consisting of Haszaimi Bol Hassan, Abdul Razak and Saifulrizal Abdul Latif.

== Military career ==
In 1993, Azman enlisted in the Royal Brunei Armed Forces (RBAF). He was appointed as an officer cadet in November 1993 after finishing his recruit training, and he received his officer cadet training at the Training Institute Royal Brunei Armed Forces. He was a platoon commander in the Second Battalion RBLF (2Bn RBLF) when he was commissioned in 1995.

He has attended a number of military career courses both domestically and abroad, including Executive Development Program Course, Command and General Staff CL 53, Methods of Instructions (MOI), Jungle Warfare Instructor, Basic Manpower Officer, Intermediate Staff, Unit Security Officers, Company Commanders Tactics, and Battalion Tactics Course.

As part of his internationally tour of duty, Major Azman was among Brunei's IMT contingent Batch 1 in 2004–2005 to observe the progress of the negotiations for peace between the Government of the Philippines and the Moro Islamic Liberation Front in Mindanao, Southern Philippines. On 13 October 2008, the Brunei contingent commander, along with four other former leaders and thirty-six members of the team, including him, received plaques and certificates of appreciation from the Philippine government for their assistance in keeping an eye on the peace process in Mindanao.

Azman had a number of command and staff positions throughout his time in the military. Among these appointments are those of SO2 Land Capability Development at the Directorate of Force Capability Development, Ministry of Defence, from 2008 to 2010, second-in-command and commanding officer of 2Bn RBLF; regimental signal officer, adjutant, officer commanding of First (1Bn RBLF) and Third Battalion (3Bn RBLF) from 2003 to 2008. Among his most recent positions are chief of staff of the RBLF, Military Assistant to the Minister of Defence II, SO1 Administration, and SO1 J5 Joint Force Headquarters.

After serving a year in Mindanao, Lieutenant Colonel Azman led the 12th IMT peacekeeping deployment before returning home on 16 September 2016. His group's main responsibilities were keeping an eye on the neighborhood, promoting the cease-fire, and settling disputes amongst the parties involved. The hardship of being apart from family and linguistic hurdles persisted despite the region's overall stability. He pointed out that the parties engaged were adhering to the peace processes put in place in 2003.

In a ceremony held on 8 December 2018, at the Officers' Mess in the Berakas Garrison, 68 RBAF officers were promoted to the next rank with the approval of Sultan Hassanal Bolkiah. Lieutenant Colonel Azman was among those elevated, becoming a colonel. Later on 27 May 2019, Colonel Khairil Ismail, the outgoing chief of staff (COS) of the RBLF, gave Colonel Azman the reins of the position at the turnover of responsibilities ceremony held at the RBLF Headquarters. On 11 September 2020, he concluded his term as COS, and Lieutenant Colonel Shanonnizam Sulaiman took over.

On 30 July 2020, Colonel Azman was appointed deputy commander of the RBLF. He gave the opening comments during the 5th Malaysia-Brunei Army-to-Army Talks virtual teleconference with the Malaysian Army, which was conducted at RBLF Headquarters on 28 July 2021. On 18 May 2022, Delfin Lorenzana arrived in Bangar Camp and was greeted by Colonel Azman, the acting commander of RBLF. At RBLF Headquarters on 20 October 2022, the transfer ceremony was placed between Colonel Muhammad Wata, the newly appointed Deputy Commander of the RBLF, and Colonel Azman. On 1 December 2023, when attending the Regimental Dinner Night at the Officer's Mess, Berakas Garrison, in observance of its 62nd anniversary, it was stated that he had retired from the service.

== Personal life ==
Azman is married to Yusnita binti Hj Duraman @ Haji Masri, and they have eight children.

== Honours ==
Azman has earned the following honours;

National

- Order of Seri Paduka Mahkota Brunei Third Class (SMB; 2013)
- Meritorious Service Medal (PJK; 2007)
- Sultan of Brunei Golden Jubilee Medal (5 October 2017)
- General Service Medal
- Long Service Medal and Good Conduct (PKLPB)
- Royal Brunei Armed Forces Golden Jubilee Medal (31 May 2011)

Foreign

- Philippines:
  - Bronze Cross Medal

Military offices
Preceded by Damit Bakar	Deputy Commander of the Royal Brunei Land Force; 30 July 2020 – 20 October 2022	Succeeded by Muhammad Wata
