= Shanonnizam Sulaiman =

Bruneian military officer

Brigadier General Shanonnizam Sulaiman SMB PSB
- شنوننظام سليمان
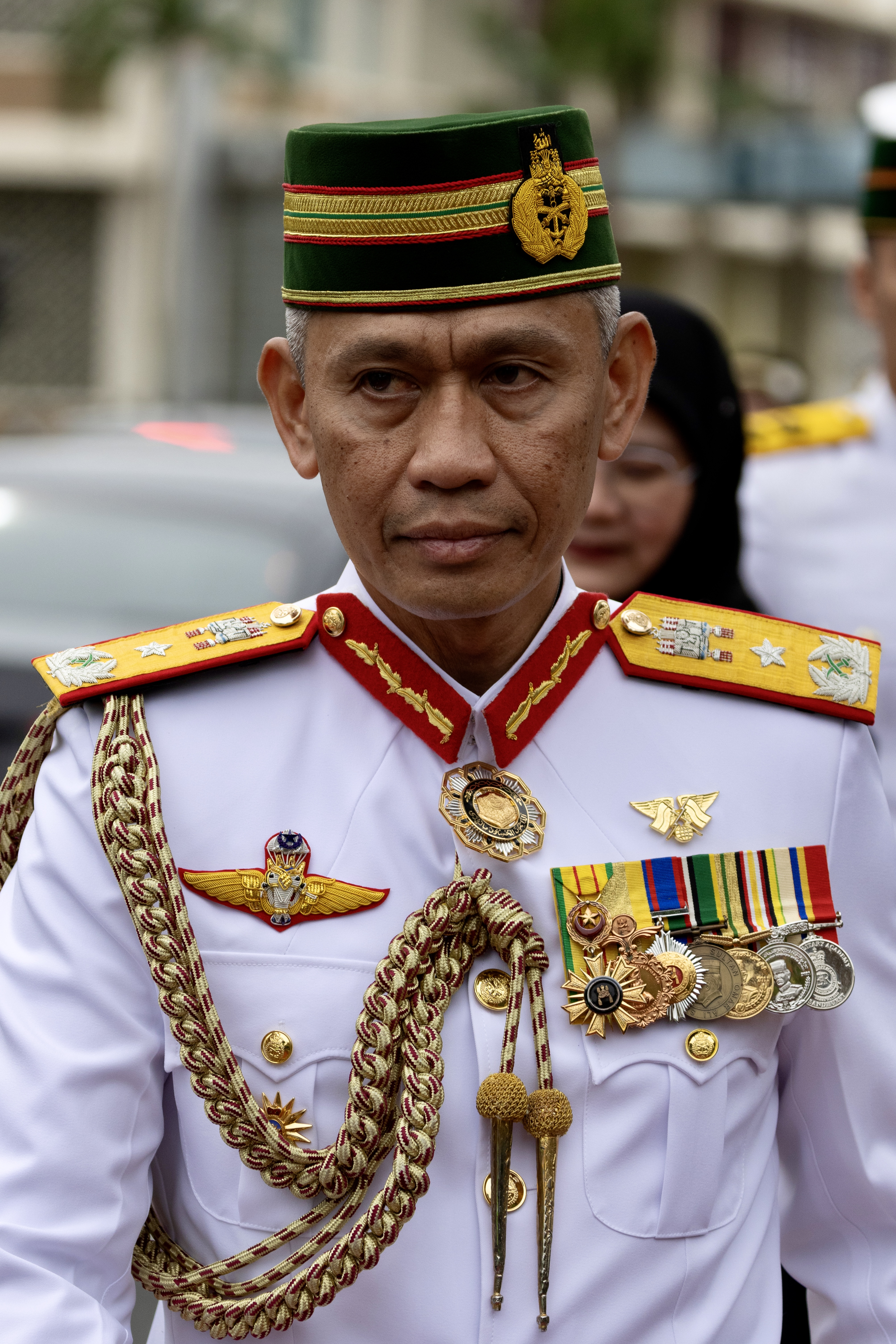
- Brigadier general Shanonnizam in 2024

14th Commander of the Royal Brunei Land Forces
- In office 9 June 2023 – 10 January 2025
- Monarch: Hassanal Bolkiah
- Deputy: Muhammad Wata
- Preceded by: Saifulrizal Abdul Latif

Personal details
- Born: Brunei
- Spouse: Rozedah Sulaiman
- Education: Royal Military Academy Sandhurst; Australian Defence College; Malaysia Armed Forces Defence College
- Profession: Military officer

Military service
- Allegiance: Brunei
- Branch/service: Royal Brunei Land Force
- Years of service: 1996–2025
- Rank: Brigadier General
- Unit: Second Battalion RBLF; RBLF Headquarters; Joint Force Headquarters
- Commands: Officer Cadet School RBAF; Third Battalion RBLF; Chief of Staff RBLF; Royal Brunei Land Forces

Mohammad Shanonnizam bin Sulaiman, simply known as Shanon, is a Bruneian military officer who served as the fourteenth commander of the Royal Brunei Land Force (RBLF) from 2023 to 2025.

== Military career ==
On 12 July 1996, Shanonnizam enlisted in the Royal Brunei Armed Forces (RBAF). After completing his officer cadet training at the Royal Military Academy Sandhurst in the United Kingdom in April 1998, he started his career as an infantry platoon commander in 'A' Company, 3rd Battalion RBLF, service number 512. He has served in a number of staff and command positions during the course of his military career, including as a signal officer training in 2000 in Warminster in the United Kingdom, a regimental signal officer for the Second Battalion RBLF and as SO3 Communication at the RBLF Headquarters. In 2003, he led the "B" Company of First Battalion RBLF, and later served as His Royal Highness the Crown Prince's aide-de-camp. He held the positions of SO2 C41 at the Directorate of Force Capability Development and SO2 Communication at the Directorate of Operations.

After a brief service as SO2 Intelligence at the RBLF Headquarters, he completed his leadership and Staff Course at the Australian Defence College in 2009 and assumed leadership of the Officer Cadet School RBAF. Then, from January 2015 to June 2017, he oversaw the Third Battalion RBLF while holding the positions of SO1 Communications Information Systems at Joint Force Headquarters (JFHQ), SO1 Land Capability Development at the Directorate of Force Capability Development, and SO1 Land Capability Development.

The Sultan of Brunei's introduction of the RBAF's 50th Anniversary Book added even more significance to the 52nd RBAF Anniversary Celebration in 2013. The goal of the book, according to Lt. Col. Shanonnizam, Head of Secretariat Publication, is to provide the RBAF with historical data since their founding so that future generations would be able to understand the RBAF's past. Co-chairs from Vietnam and China emphasised the success of the first multilateral exercise during the third ADMM-Plus Expert Working Group (EWG) meeting on HADR in 2014 in Nha Trang, Vietnam. Lt. Col. Shanonnizam, the leader of the delegation and head of the ADMM-Plus HADR and MM Exercise, represented Brunei at the EWG meeting.

After serving for three years as the defence adviser to the United Kingdom and the non-resident defense attache to France and Germany, he was appointed chief of staff of the RBLF on 30 July 2020. After enrolling at the Malaysia Armed Forces Defence College in January 2021, he returned to the chief of staff position on 31 January 2022, having earned a master's degree in defense studies.

Following an inaugural ceremony held at Lumut Camp on 13 June later that year, a military exercise involving the RBLF and the United States Army Pacific (USARPAC) officially got underway. In its second iteration, the Exercise Pahlawan Warrior aims to improve partner land force capacity and capabilities, resolve internal security issues, and boost interoperability operations while reiterating shared security commitments to the Indo-Pacific region. The RBLF's chief of staff, Shanonnizam emphasized the value of the alliance between the RBLF and USARPAC for the area.

On 27 June 2022, he took over as the first field commander of the RBLF, and on 9 June 2023, he was named commander of the RBLF, succeeding Brig. Gen. Saifulrizal. A day before with the consent of Sultan Hassanal Bolkiah he was promoted to the rank of brigadier general. The insignia was handed during a ceremony at the Officers' Mess at Bolkiah Garrison by Major General Haszaimi. In his inaugural address as the 14th commander of the RBLF, Brigadier General Haji Mohammad Shanonnizam conveyed three fundamental principles; Satria, Setia, and Sedia - that would foster and increase the spirit of chivalry, loyalty, and preparedness to every member in order to ensure the RBLF will carry out its roles and duties as an organization that is united, credible, and flexible in maintaining the peace and prosperity of Brunei.

Shanonnizam waved goodbye in a parade event at Berakas Garrison's First Battalion RBLF Parade Square on 10 January 2025. He reiterated his allegiance to the sultan, thanked the RBLF staff for their support, and outlined 2024 accomplishments and 2025 goals in line with Wawasan Brunei 2035.

== Personal life ==
Pengiran Hajah Rozedah binti Pengiran Haji Sulaiman is the wife of Shanonnizam, and they have a son together. He likes to read and run in his free time.

== Honours ==
Shannonizam has earned the following honours;

National

- Order of Setia Negara Brunei Fourth Class (PSB)
- Order of Seri Paduka Mahkota Brunei Third Class (SMB)
- Sultan of Brunei Golden Jubilee Medal (5 October 2017)
- General Service Medal (Armed Forces)
- Long Service Medal and Good Conduct (PKLPB)
- Royal Brunei Armed Forces Golden Jubilee Medal (31 May 2011)
- Royal Brunei Armed Forces Diamond Jubilee Medal (31 May 2021)

Foreign

- United Kingdom:
  - Recipient of the Sandhurst Medal
- Singapore:
  - Honorary Master Parachutist Wing (5 December 2024)
- Thailand:
  - Honorary Parachutist Badge

Military offices
Preceded by Saifulrizal Abdul Latif	14th Commander of the Royal Brunei Land Forces; 9 June 2023 – 10 January 2025	Succeeded by Vacant
