= Khairul Hamed =

Bruneian military officer

Brigadier General (Retired) Dato Seri Pahlawan Khairul Hamed PSPNB PSB
- خير الحامد لمڤوه
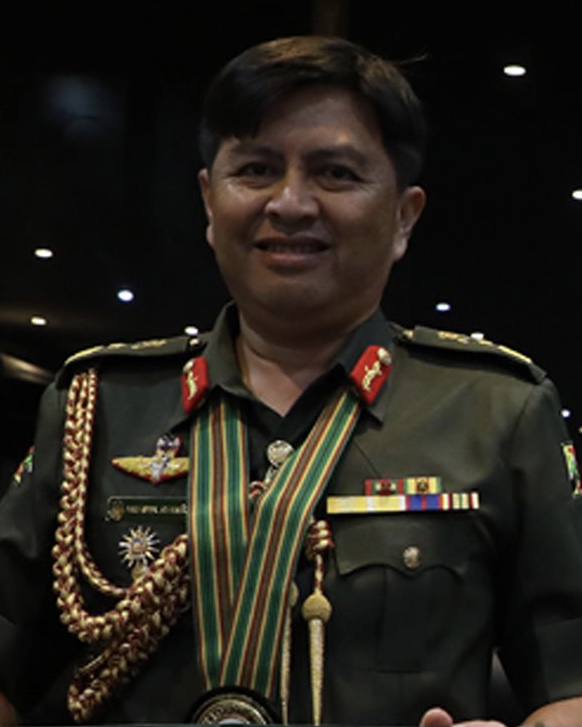
- Brigadier General Khairul Hamed in 2019

10th Commander of the Royal Brunei Land Forces
- In office 31 January 2018 – 30 July 2020
- Monarch: Hassanal Bolkiah
- Deputy: Damit Bakar
- Preceded by: Pengiran Aminan
- Succeeded by: Haszaimi Bol Hassan

Personal details
- Born: Brunei
- Spouse: Mazlin Osman
- Education: Singapore Command and Staff College; National University of Malaysia (MSSc)
- Profession: Military officer

Military service
- Allegiance: Brunei
- Branch/service: Royal Brunei Land Force
- Years of service: 1991–2020
- Rank: Brigadier General
- Unit: Second Battalion RBLF; Third Battalion RBLF; Joint Force Headquarters
- Commands: Training Institute RBAF; Royal Brunei Land Forces

Khairul Hamed bin Haji Lampoh is a Bruneian military officer who was the 10th Commander of the Royal Brunei Land Forces (RBLF) from 2018 to 2020.

== Education ==
Throughout his career, he attended several institutes and training overseas; graduated from Officer Cadet School, Waiouru, New Zealand on 19 June 1991, the Jungle Warfare Long Range Patrol Course with Training Team Brunei in Seria, Belait in 1991, the Platoon Commander Course at PULADA, Malaysia in 1992, the Staff Duty Course in Port Dickson, Malaysia in 1997, the Advanced Infantry Officer Course and Company Tactic Course in Singapore in 2000, the Army Advance Tactics Course in Malaysia in 2001, the Advanced Military Technology in Singapore in 2004 and Singapore Command and Staff College in 2005. Graduate of Malaysian Armed Forces Defence College with Master of Social Science (MSSc) in Defence Studies, awarded at The National University of Malaysia in 2014.

== Military career ==
On 5 February 1990, he underwent military recruit training and would come back from New Zealand, as an officer cadet that following year. He would then become an Infantry Platoon Commander and Commanding Officer (CO) of with Second Battalion RBLF. After that, he was posted as an Intake Commander at Recruit Company and later, Chief instructors at Training Center Royal Brunei Armed Forces (present day Training Institute RBAF). The handover ceremony between Abidin Abdul Hamid an Khairul Hamed was held at Penanjong Garrison on 29 July 2016.

Other than being an instructor, he was an adjutant of Third Battalion RBLF and Chief of Staff, Joint Force Head Quarters (COS JFHQ), later promoted to colonel in 2015 and became the COS RBLF. Due to his expertise and experiences in the military, Colonel Khairul Hamed was appointed as the 10th Commander of the RBLF. The appointment was made upon the consent of Sultan Hassanal Bolkiah, and the handover ceremony between Khairul Hamed and Aminan Mahmud was held at Bolkiah Garrison, Bandar Seri Begawan on 31 January 2018. Two days later on 2 February, he would be promoted to the rank of brigadier general.

The 20 April 2018, the handover ceremony of the newly acquired KH-27 patrol boats was attended both Commander Aminan Mahmud and Khairul Hamed. Brigadier General Khairul Hamed signed a Terms of Reference (TOR) with then Commander of the Philippine Army, Lieutenant General Macairog S. Alberto at Fort Bonifacio, Metro Manila on 13 November 2019. The signing aims to expand the two nation's bilateral cooperation and establish a stronger regional security. On 30 July 2020, the handover ceremony between Khairul Hamed and the next commander, Muhammad Haszaimi, was held at Berakas Garrison.

== Personal life ==
Khairul Hamed is married to Mazlin binti Osman and has six children together. In addition, he enjoys golfing and traveling.

== Honours ==
=== National ===
- Order of Pahlawan Negara Brunei First Class (PSPNB; 15 July 2018) – Dato Seri Pahlawan
- Order of Setia Negara Brunei Fourth Class (PSB; 2012)
- Sultan of Brunei Golden Jubilee Medal (5 October 2017)
- Sultan of Brunei Silver Jubilee Medal (5 October 1992)
- General Service Medal (Armed Forces)
- Royal Brunei Armed Forces Golden Jubilee Medal (31 May 2011)

=== Foreign ===
- Singapore:
  - Pingat Jasa Gemilang (Tentera) (PJG; 4 December 2019)

Military offices
Preceded by Pengiran Aminan	10th Commander of the Royal Brunei Land Forces; 31 January 2018 – 30 July 2020	Succeeded by Haszaimi Bol Hassan
Preceded by Abidin Abdul Hamid	21st Commander of the Training Institute; 29 July 2016 – 30 January 2018	Succeeded by Haszaimi Bol Hassan
