= Royal Brunei Land Force =

Land warfare branch of the military of Brunei Darussalam

- Malay: Tentera Darat Diraja Brunei; Jawi: تنترا دارت دراج بروني
- Royal Brunei Land Force coat of arms
- Founded: 1 January 1984 (42 years, 9 months) (in current form) 31 May 1961 (65 years, 4 months) (as the Brunei Malay Regiment)
- Country: Brunei
- Type: Army
- Role: Land warfare
- Size: 3,000
- Part of: Royal Brunei Armed Forces
- Anniversaries: 4 November
- Equipment: See list
- Website: land.mindef.gov.bn

Commanders
- Commander: Brigadier General Aldi Hassan
- Deputy Commander: Colonel Muhammad Wata
- Field Commander: Colonel Mohammad Fakaruddin Zuraidie Ramli
- Chief of Staff: Colonel Erwan Ibrahim
- Sergeant Major: Warrant Officer 1 Mohammad Haswandi Paun

Insignia
- Flag

The Royal Brunei Land Force (RBLF), natively known as Tentera Darat Diraja Brunei (TDDB) is the land component of the Royal Brunei Armed Forces (RBAF) or Angkatan Bersenjata Diraja Brunei (ABDB). The RBLF has responsibility for maintaining the territorial defence of Brunei Darussalam, both from attack from outsiders, and by assisting the Royal Brunei Police Force (RBPF) in maintaining law and order. The anniversary ceremony of RBLF's inception was place on 4 November every year.

== History ==
=== Early years ===
The Brunei Malay Regiment (BMR), also natively known as the Askar Melayu Brunei (AMB) was formed in May 1961, when the first intake of 60 recruits began training. The formal foundation of the regiment occurred in June 1962 when men of the first three intakes were formed into the regimental headquarters and three rifle companies. The Brunei uprising during the night of 7–8 December 1962, posed a serious threat to the newly established regiment. The government hastened the creation of a more formidable defense force in response to the rebellion, which brought attention to the need for greater national security. The trained BMR members were kept within their camp throughout the uprising, preventing them from demonstrating their efficacy in spite of the necessity. In retaliation, Brunei was invaded by British soldiers, among them the Royal Gurkha Rifles.

Personnel from the BMR successfully completed their training in the Federation of Malaya in 1963. In order to complete a battalion, Deputy Prime Minister Tun Abdul Razak anticipated Brunei would contribute additional soldiers. In May, Brunei recruited more troops between the ages of 18 and 25, and in December, the country invited volunteers for short-service commissions. A six-week officer cadet training program was conducted at the Federation Military College in Sungai Besi for selected applicants from Segenting Camp. There were 410 members of the regiment at the end of 1963. However, the BMR was impacted when Malaya withdrew its soldiers from Brunei in August 1963 when Brunei refused to join the Federation of Malaya. While backup arrangements were in place, Brunei had some difficulties due to the sudden departure from Malayan training grounds.

It was evident by early 1964 that the regiment was no longer able to supply officers, trainers, or other services. The first phase of Brunei's Berakas Camp was almost finished, notwithstanding this setback. The Malayan commanding officer of the BMR was replaced by Lieutenant Colonel D. M. Fletcher, while regimental sergeant major and adjutant posts were filled by British Army soldiers on secondment. The BMR relocated from Segenting Camp to Berakas Camp, their permanent headquarters on 2 May 1964. By year's end, the regiment was prepared to take over many of the internal security responsibilities previously performed by the British Forces Brunei. Major General Dato Walter said on 11 July 1964, that the BMR was now functioning in the state, however he did not provide any specifics. The new encampment, which Sultan Hassanal Bolkiah named Bolkiah Camp in the middle of the year, was intended to house the Brigade Headquarters, provide support for the troops, and housing 700–800 men.

=== Further developments ===
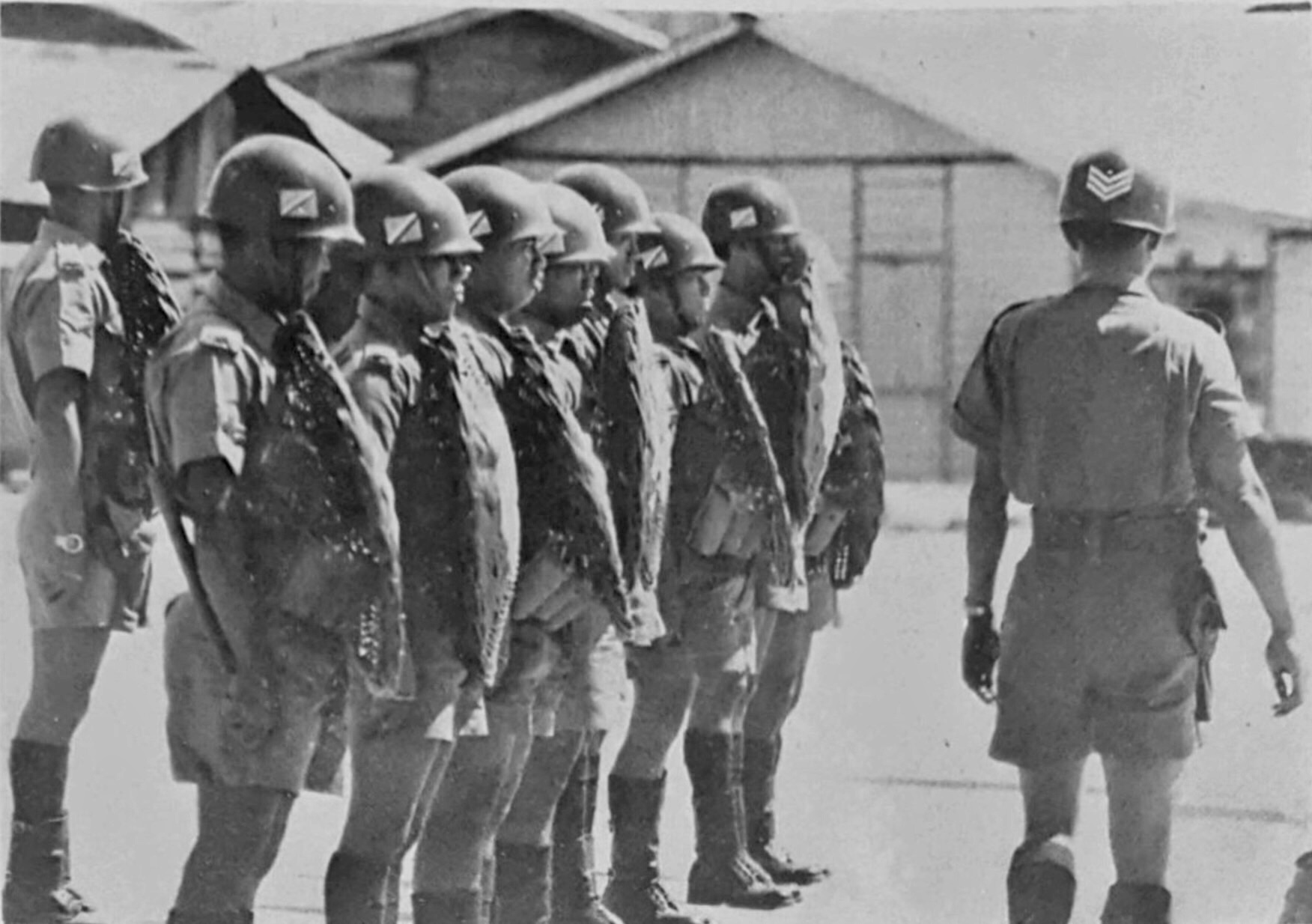
Soldiers of the RBMR in 1967

With further fortifications, the BMR was renamed the Royal Brunei Malay Regiment (RBMR) on 31 May 1965. Natively called the Askar Melayu Diraja Brunei (AMDB), the regiment was granted the title "Royal" at its fourth-anniversary parade. The Royal Brunei Malay Regiment established two new units, the Boat Section and the Air Service in 1965 to increase its capabilities further. These two units, together with the infantry, were amalgamated into a single task force in 1966. In 1966, the RBMR kept growing even after Malaysia temporarily stopped training Brunei's military. Rifle companies did, however, spend February and March training at Kota Belud. The Royal Colours were handed to the RBMR at the regiment's fifth-anniversary festivities; they remained in place until 31 May 1971, when they were altered. At this point, British officers started delegating some of their responsibilities to local officials, and Captain Mohammad was made Adjutant. Four TNKU members who had infiltrated from Sarawak were apprehended by soldiers from the regiment's number 6 and 9 platoons during small-scale operations in Bukit Belalong, Temburong District, in October. At an investiture ceremony held at Istana Darul Hana on 18 April, the following year, the Sultan paid tribute to a number of troops, notably Second Lieutenant Musa and Second Lieutenant Husin.

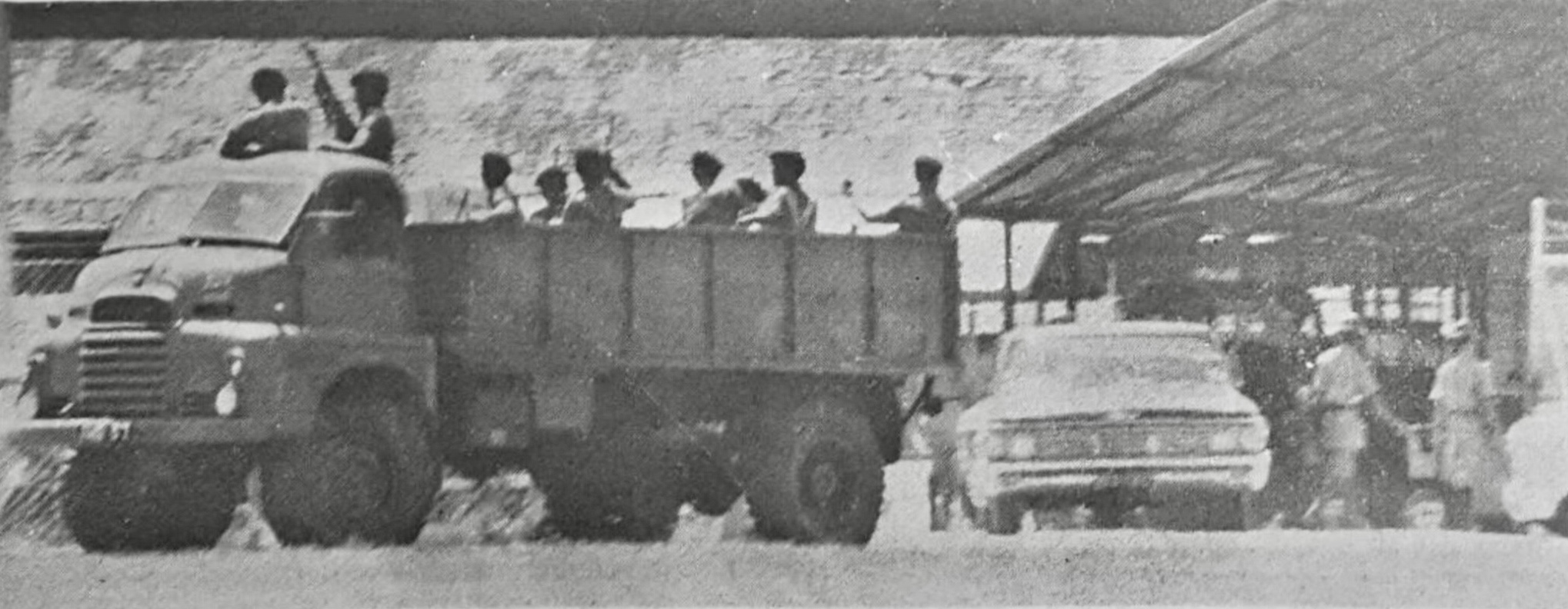
A RBMR Bedford RL in 1967

The RBMR changed the black and white backdrop of their shoulder titles and hat symbol to new regimental colours in 1967. The British Army's olive green shirt and pants design was adopted as part of the operational dress code, and flashes were worn on jungle helmets in place of the company colors. A new progression scheme was introduced for commissioned officers in Brunei, which was based on the British Army framework. At the School of Infantry in Warminster, three local officers, Captain Sulaiman, Captain Awangku Ibnu, and Captain Mohammad, participated in a three-month advanced school in small weapons and tactics. After finishing, they were to join an infantry brigade in England and then go to Germany to serve for a month apiece with three separate British battalions. The RBMR began to develop significantly on 7 April 1969, when it formed a Training Wing. The regiment was restructured and had grown to 928 troops by year's end. An autonomous training facility was relocated to Bolkiah Camp, while Berakas Camp's administrative elements were consolidated under a new headquarters wing. Potential recruits can now be found in secondary schools thanks to the introduction of the experimental army cadet program.

In 1972, the regiment's structure was changed, with the infantry, aviation and naval sections split into separate units once again. The infantry companies became the 1st Battalion, RBMR, with a total of five rifle companies. Three years later, the 2nd Battalion, RBMR was formed by deamalgamating B and E Companies of the 1st Battalion. After nearly two years of training, the 2nd Battalion was established on the fourteenth anniversary of the regiment. In order to staff the specialist Gurkha Reserve Unit (GRU), which was formed from former British Gurkha soldiers, a significant recruitment drive was started in 1976. Pengiran Isteri Hajah Mariam was the Colonel-in-Chief of the RBMR Women's Company (Kompeni Askar Wanita), which was also founded in 1981. In the years running up to gaining independence, from 1979 to 1984, Brunei's defence plans underwent a substantial transformation as a result of Britain's intended military pullout. 1979 saw Brunei and Britain sign the 1979 Treaty of Friendship and Cooperation, which signaled a turning point in the British disengagement plan. In retaliation, Brunei boosted military spending and expedited the procurement of cutting-edge weapons to fortify the RBMR and have it ready to secede from British control.

=== Present day ===
Following Brunei's independence from the United Kingdom on 1 January 1984, the RBMR was renamed as the Royal Brunei Land Force (RBLF), part of the wider Royal Brunei Armed Forces (RBAF). In 1990, the Support Battalion was formed comprising an armoured reconnaissance squadron, air defence battery and combat engineer squadron, together with maintenance and administrative support. In 1994, the 3rd Battalion RBLF was formed from members of D Company, 1st Battalion RBLF and F Company, 2nd Battalion RBLF, while the air defence battery and engineering workshop were transferred from the Support Battalion to the Royal Brunei Air Force (RBAirF) and the Support Service RBAF (SS RBAF) respectively.

On 9 July 2011, the RBLF conducted trials to replace their DPM BDUs with Digital Disruptive Pattern BDUs under a contract with Force-21 Equipment.

== Organisation ==
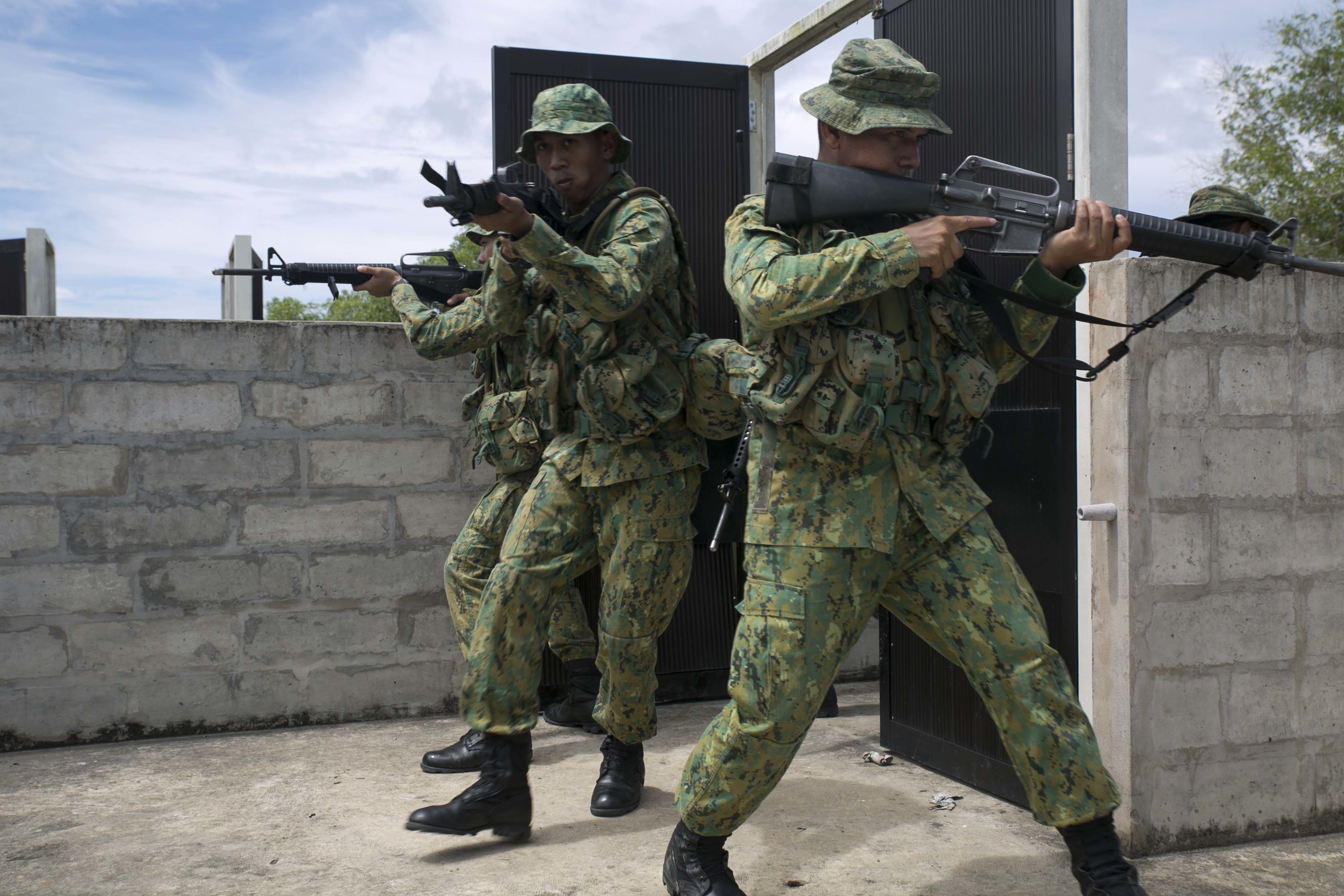
First Battalion soldiers conducting a MOUT training during CARAT 2014.

The Royal Brunei Land Force is organised as four separate battalions:

- First Battalion
- Second Battalion
- Third Battalion
- Support Battalion

=== First Battalion ===
The First Battalion was established in 1962; the organisation consisted of the first three intakes undertaking basic military training. At the beginning, the organisation was set up in Segenting Camp, Port Dickson, Malaysia. After the development of Berakas Garrison in 1975, the organisation was then changed to the First Battalion Land Force. Under the command of Colonel J. F. Davis, the force consisted of the various departments, including Markas Company, and five Rifle Companies (A, B, C, D and E).

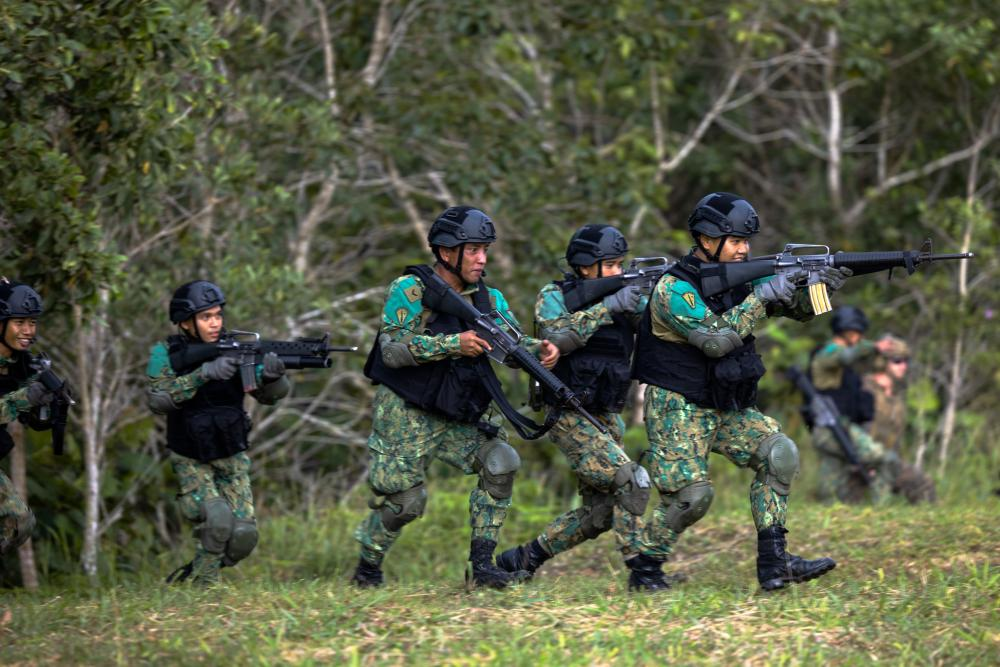
Soldiers from the Second Battalion in action during CARAT 2022.

=== Second Battalion ===
The Second Battalion was formed on 2 January 1975 at the Bolkiah Garrison. Before this, the Battalion was comprised Company B and E of the First Battalion under the command of the then Commanding Officer, Lieutenant Colonel A.E. Hibbert. The battalion moved to Tutong Camp on 10 May 1976. Following the formation of the Second Battalion, Pengiran Ratna Indera Lieutenant Colonel Pengiran Dato Setia Ibnu bin Pengiran Datu Penghulu Pengiran Haji Apong was then appointed as the commanding officer in charge.

=== Third Battalion ===
The Third Battalion was formed and established on 31 May 1994. The battalion was made up of D Company from the First Battalion and F Company of the Second Battalion and the Command Company from the First and Second Battalion. Major Shahlan bin Hidup was the first appointed Commanding Officer in charge of the Battalion. Previously based in Penanjong Garrison, as of 21 June 2007, the Battalion has relocated to a new camp at Lumut in the Belait District.

=== Support Battalion ===
The Support Unit was originally established based on five major units; namely an Armoured Reconnaissance Squadron, a Combat Engineer Squadron, an Air Defence Battery, the Penanjong Workshop and Penanjong Garrison Headquarters. It was reorganised on 2 January 1990, and officially established as the Support Battalion, which comprises three major units; namely, an Armoured Reconnaissance Squadron, a Combat Engineer Squadron and the Company Headquarters Support Battalion.

== Commander ==
No.	Portrait	Name (Birth–Death)	Term of office			Ref.
No.	Portrait	Name (Birth–Death)	Took office	Left office	Time in office	Ref.
1		Major general Husin Ahmad (born 1944)	17 September 1991	10 August 1994	2 years, 327 days	
2		Major general Shari Ahmad	11 August 1994	28 October 1999	5 years, 78 days	
3		Major general Jaafar Abdul Aziz	29 October 1999	31 January 2001	1 year, 84 days	
4		Major general Halbi Mohammad Yussof (born 1956)	1 February 2001	14 March 2003	3 years, 42 days	
5		Colonel; Abdu'r Rahmani Basir	15 March 2003	1 July 2005	1 year, 108 days	
6		Colonel; Rosli Chuchu	1 July 2005	12 December 2008	3 years, 164 days	
7		Major general Aminuddin Ihsan (born 1966)	12 December 2008	13 November 2009	336 days	
8		Brigadier general Yussof Abdul Rahman	13 November 2009	1 December 2014	5 years, 18 days	
9		Major general Pengiran Aminan (born 1968)	1 December 2014	31 January 2018	3 years, 60 days	
10		Brigadier general Khairul Hamed	31 January 2018	30 July 2020	2 years, 191 days	
11		Major general Haszaimi Bol Hassan	30 July 2020	1 March 2022	1 year, 224 days	
12		Brigadier general Abdul Razak (born 1972)	1 March 2022	10 June 2022	101 days	
13		Brigadier general Saifulrizal Abdul Latif	10 June 2022	9 June 2023	364 days	
14		Brigadier general Shanonnizam Sulaiman	9 June 2023	10 January 2025	1 year, 215 days	
15		Brigadier general Aldi Hassan	1 August 2025	Incumbent	1 year, 90 days	

== Rank structure ==
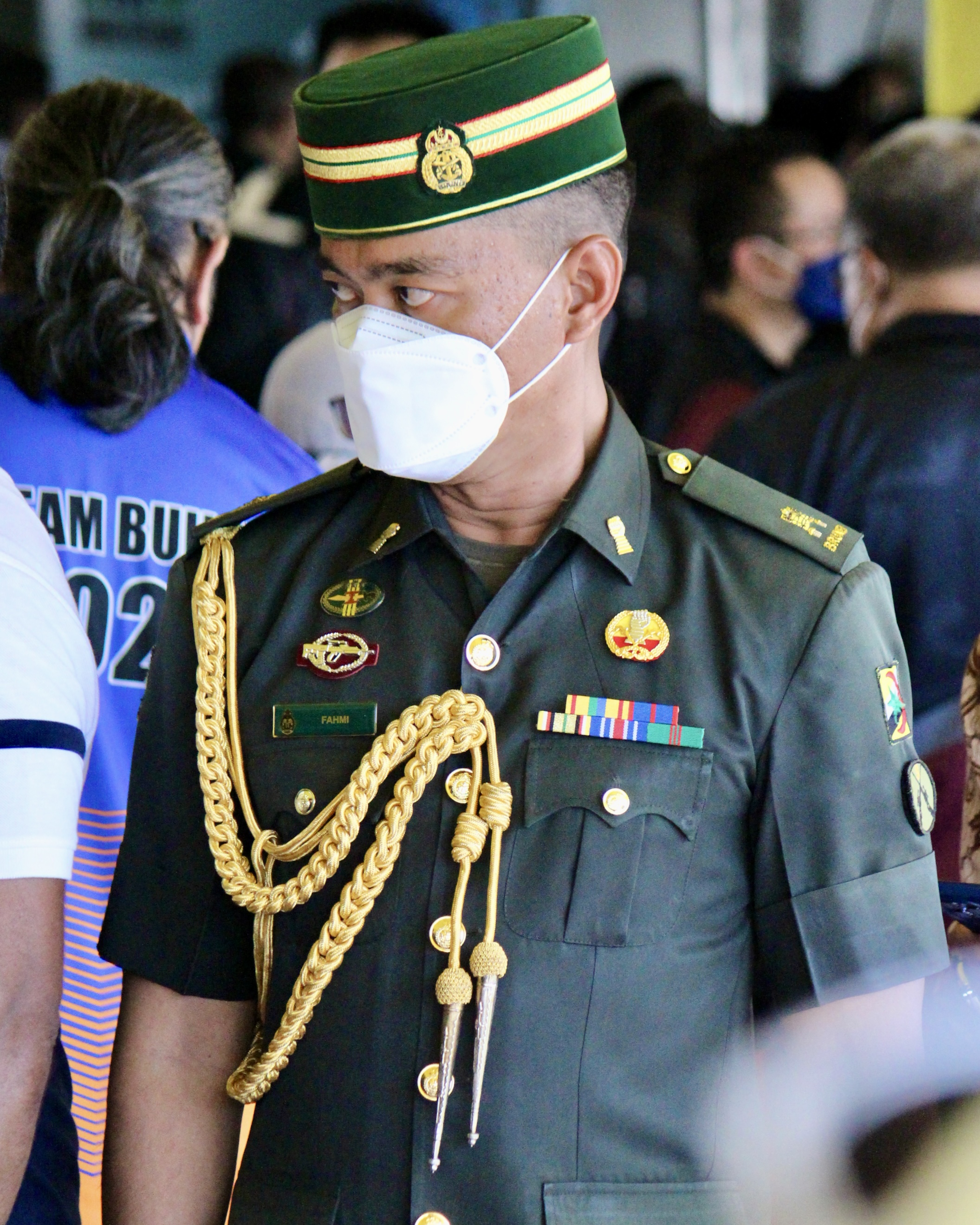
A major serving as an aide-de-camp on 21 July 2022

=== Commissioned Officers ===
The rank insignia for commissioned officers for the Royal Brunei Land Force.

Rank group	General / flag officers					Senior officers			Junior officers
Royal Brunei Land Force
Royal Brunei Land Force	Fil marsyal	Jeneral	Leftenan jeneral	Mejar jeneral	Brigedier jeneral	Kolonel	Leftenan kolonel	Mejar	Kapten	Leftenan	Leftenan muda

=== Enlisted ===
Unlike most Commonwealth armed forces, Brunei has maintained two warrant officer ranks, used in conjunction with the standard Commonwealth NCO and enlisted personnel and ratings ranks. The following are the rank insignia for enlisted personnel for the Royal Brunei Land Force.

Rank group	Senior NCOs				Junior NCOs		Enlisted
Royal Brunei Land Force							No insignia
Royal Brunei Land Force	Pegawai waran 1	Pegawai waran 2	Staf sarjan	Sarjan	Koperal	Lans koperal	Prebet/Soldadu

== Equipment ==
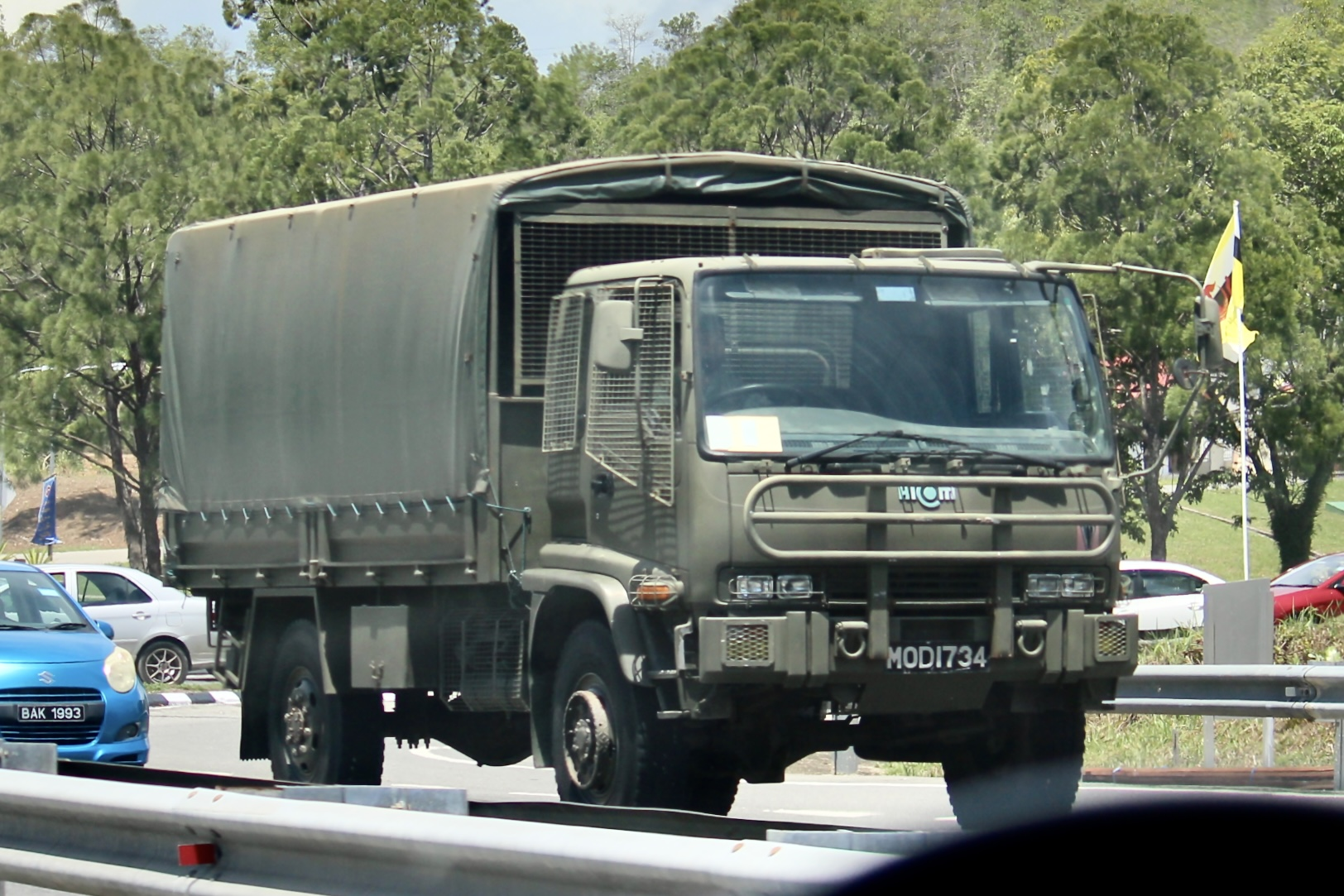
HICOM Handalan

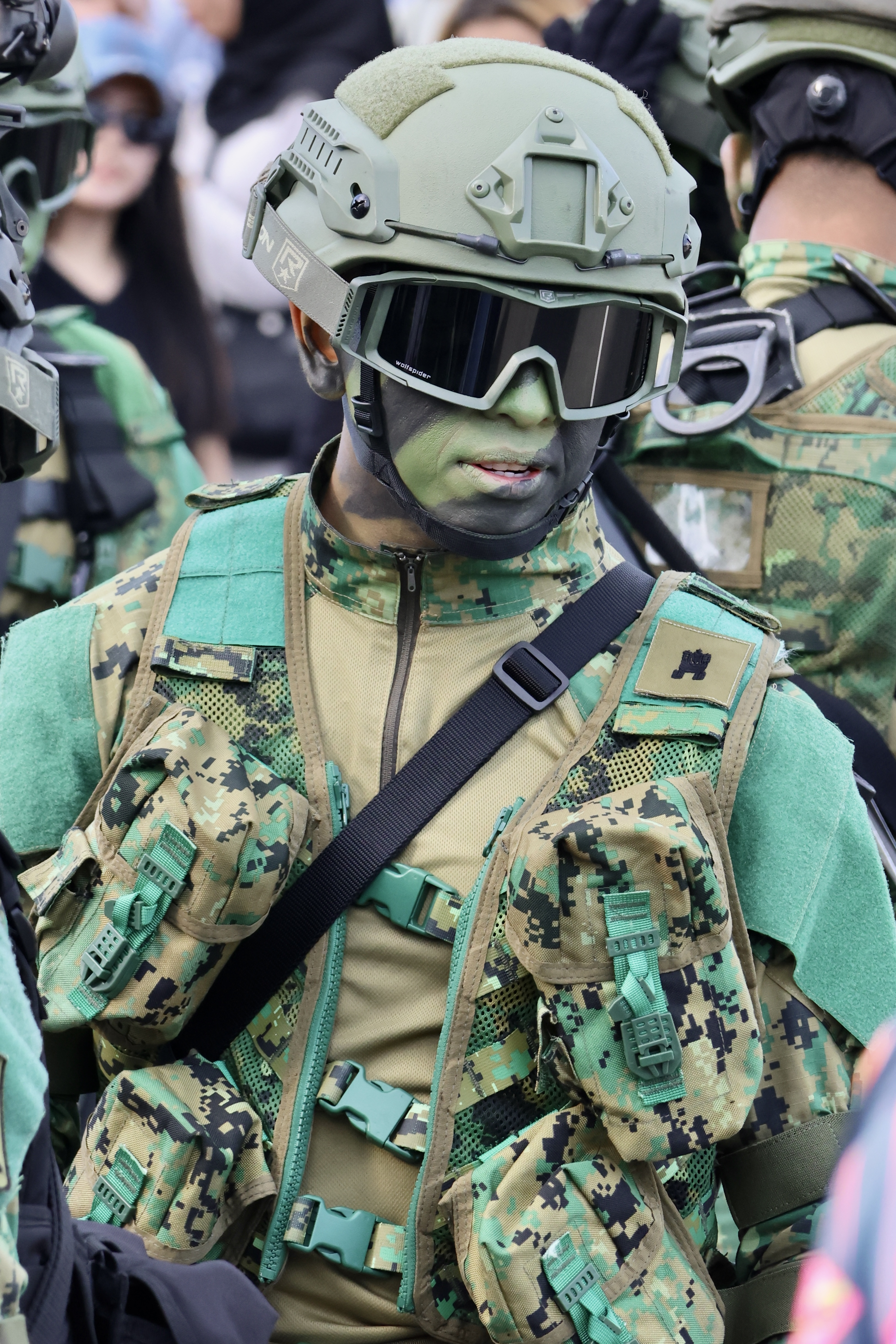
Bruneian soldier in combat dress

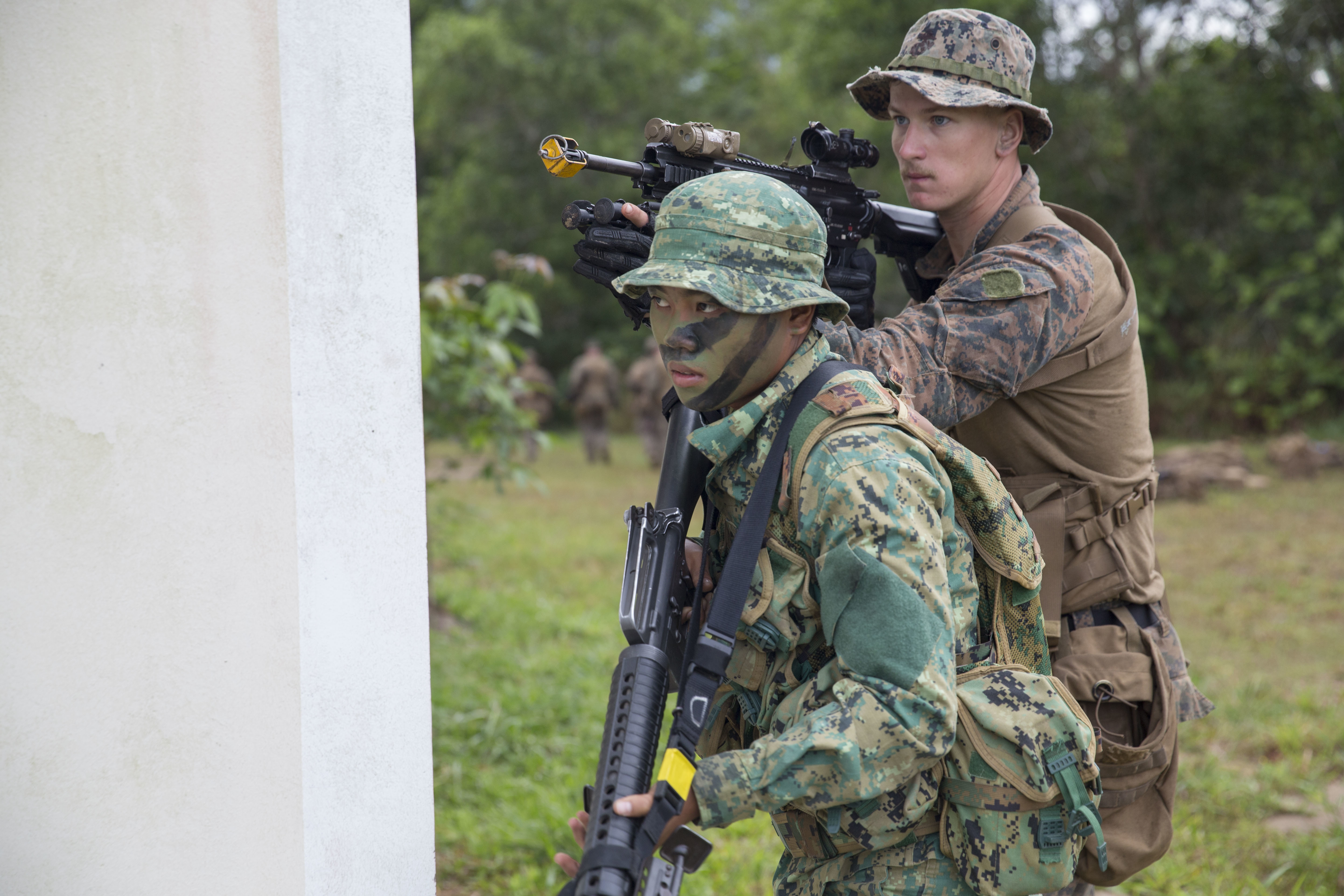
Bruneian and US Marine training during CARAT 2019.

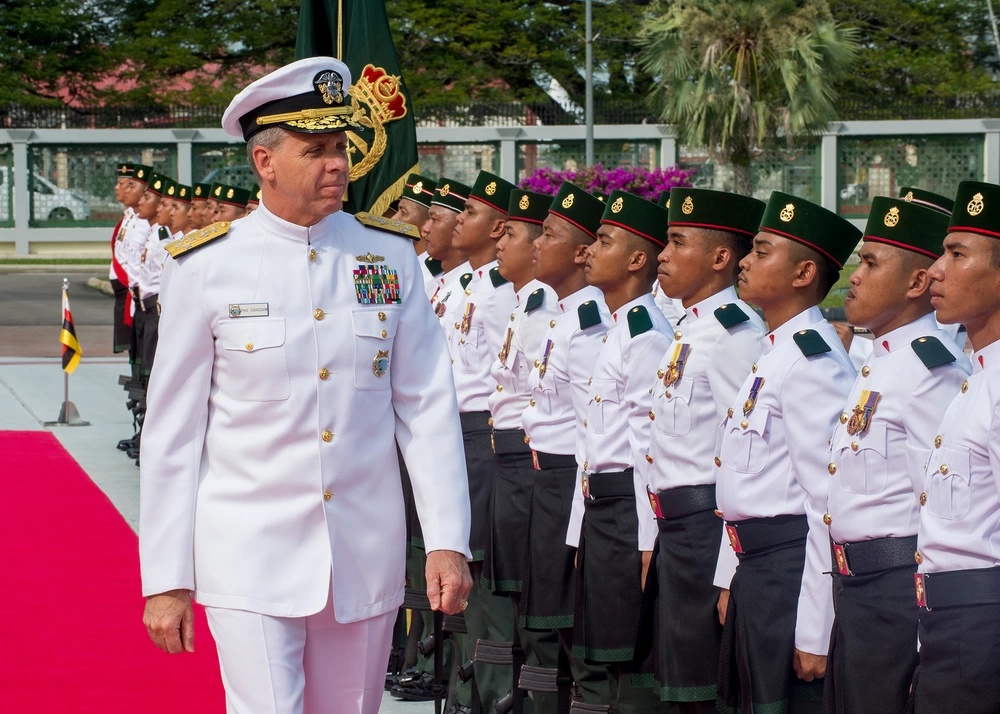
Bruneian honour guards

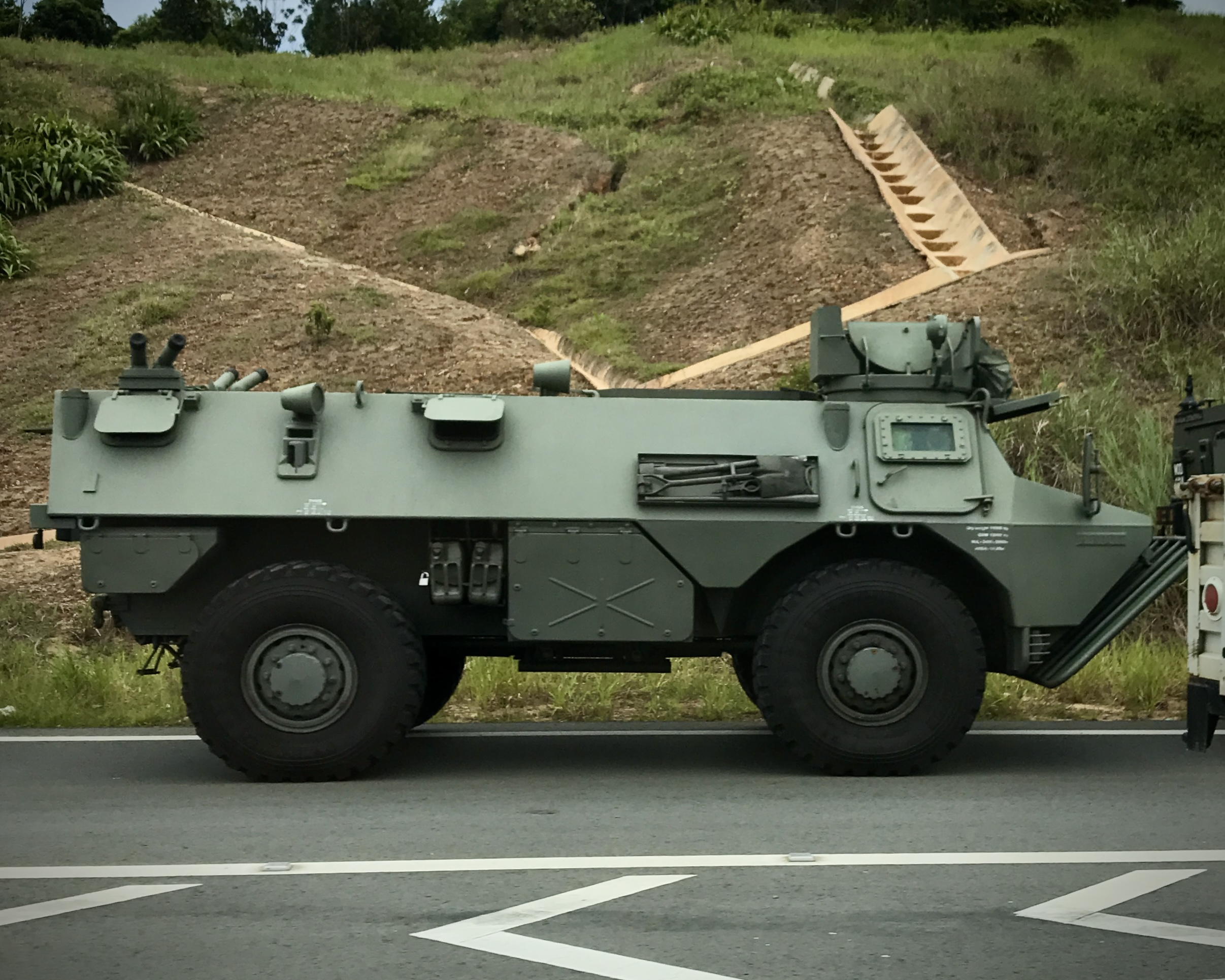
Véhicule de l'Avant Blindé (VAB) VTT

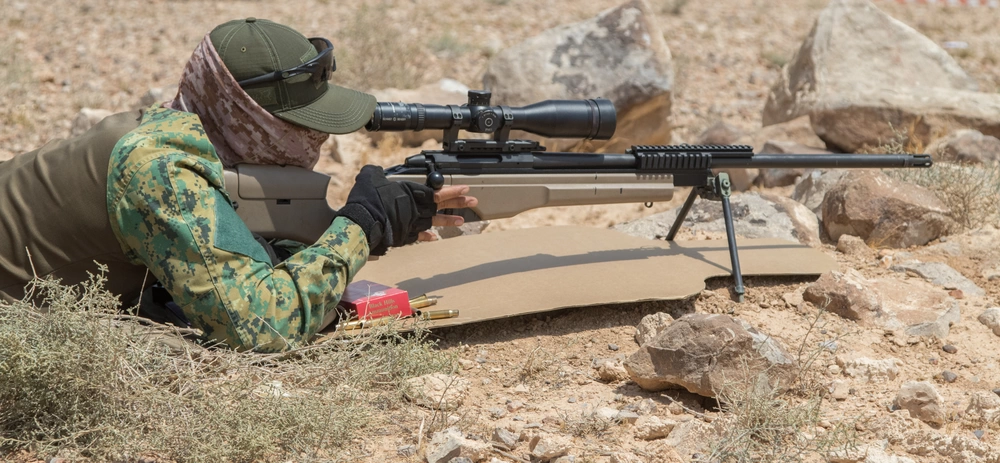
Bruneian sniper with a SAKO M591

== Bases ==
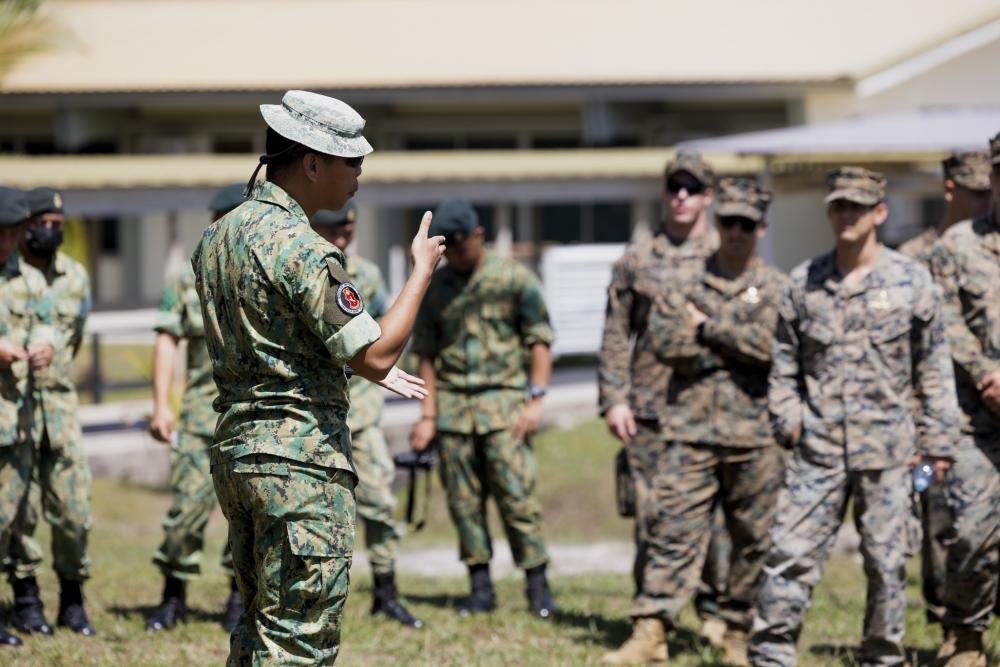
Training between Brunei and the United States at Tutong Camp during CARAT 2022.

Name	Location	Unit(s)
Berakas Camp	Berakas 'A'	First Battalion Royal Brunei Land Force (1Bn RBLF); Royal Brunei Land Force Headquarters (RBLF HQ); Headquarters Company Royal Brunei Land Force (HQ Coy RBLF); Dental Services Royal Brunei Land Force (DS RBLF); Combat Service Support, Royal Brunei Land Force (CSS RBLF); Land Engineering Combat Service Support Royal Brunei Land Force (LE CSS RBLF)
Bolkiah Garrison	Berakas 'A'	Logistic Depot; Medical Health and Services Headquarters
Sungai Akar Camp	Berakas 'B'	Royal Guards Regiment Royal Brunei Land Force (RGdR RBLF)
Lumut Camp	Liang	Third Battalion Royal Brunei Land Force (3Bn RBLF); Military Transport Platoon, Third Battalion of Royal Brunei Land Force (MT Plt, 3Bn RBLF); Intelligence Section, Third Battalion of Royal Brunei Land Force (Int Sect, 3Bn RBLF)
Tutong Camp	Pekan Tutong	Second Battalion Royal Brunei Land Force (2Bn RBLF)
Penanjong Garrison	Pekan Tutong	Support Battalion Royal Brunei Land Force (Sp Bn RBLF); School of Infantry Royal Brunei Land Force (SOI RBLF); Land Engineering
Bangar Camp	Bangar	
Muara Naval Base	Serasa	Combat Boat Squadron, Support Battalion Royal Brunei Land Force (CBS, Sp Bn RBLF)
Baru-Baru Island	Brunei Bay	Forward Operating Base (FOB)

== International ties ==
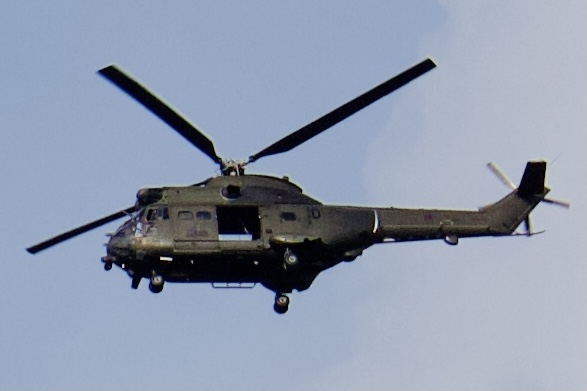
British Puma helicopter in flight over Jerudong in 2022.

=== United Kingdom ===
The Royal Brunei Land Force has significant ties to the British Army, due in no small part to the fact that there is a permanent British garrison in Brunei. Following the Brunei Revolt in 1962, an agreement was signed between Brunei and the United Kingdom that a battalion of Gurkhas would be stationed in the country to protect various British interests, most notably the major oil installations at Seria. The current garrison consists of a battalion of the Royal Gurkha Rifles, plus a flight of helicopters from the Army Air Corps in support. However, Brunei is also used by the British Army in general for training in jungle warfare. The presence of one of the British Army's few significant overseas garrisons provides an opportunity to assist the RBLF in its training.

=== Other nations ===
The RBLF maintains close ties with many other nations, both in the South-East Asia region and elsewhere. The RBLF conducts exercises with the Malaysian Army and the Singapore Army on a regular basis. The RBLF has also conducted regular exercises with the armies of both Australia, China, New Zealand, Philippines and Thailand, while the United States Marine Corps conducts annual Cooperation Afloat Readiness and Training (CARAT) in Brunei.

== Alliances ==
- United Kingdom - Brigade of Gurkhas
- Singapore - Singapore Armed Forces
