= Abdul Razak Abdul Kadir =

Bruneian military officer (born 1972)

His Excellency Brigadier General (Retired) Dato Seri Pahlawan Abdul Razak Abdul Kadir PSPNB PSB PJK
- عبد الرازق عبد القادر
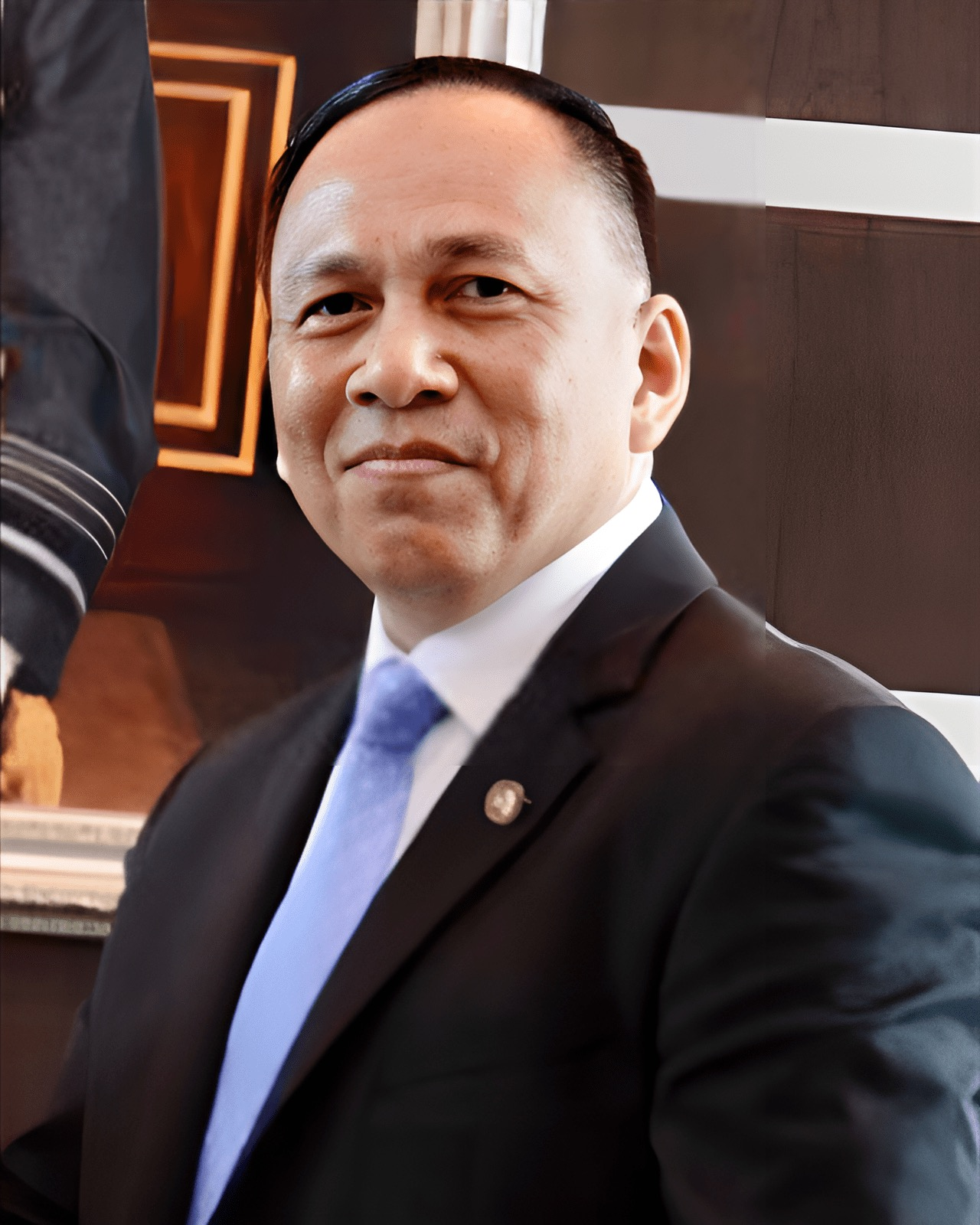
- Deputy Minister Abdul Razak in 2023

Ambassador of Brunei to Indonesia
- Incumbent
- Assumed office 17 February 2024
- Preceded by: Yussof Abdul Rahman

5th Deputy Minister of Defence
- In office 7 June 2022 – 27 February 2023
- Monarch: Hassanal Bolkiah
- Minister: Hassanal Bolkiah
- Preceded by: Office reconvened
- Succeeded by: Office abolished

12th Commander of the Royal Brunei Land Forces
- In office 1 March 2022 – 10 June 2022
- Deputy: Azman Bangkol
- Preceded by: Haszaimi Bol Hassan
- Succeeded by: Saifulrizal Abdul Latif

Personal details
- Born: 21 March 1972 (age 54) Brunei
- Education: Royal Military College; University of Balochistan; Pakistan Command and Staff College; National Defense College of the Philippines
- Profession: Military officer; politician; diplomat

Military service
- Allegiance: Brunei
- Branch/service: Royal Brunei Land Force
- Years of service: 1989–2022
- Rank: Brigadier General
- Unit: International Monitoring Team
- Commands: Directorate of Strategic Planning; Joint Force Commander; Royal Brunei Land Forces

Abdul Razak bin Haji Abdul Kadir (born 21 March 1972) is the current Ambassador of Brunei to Indonesia since 2024. He was formerly the Deputy Minister of Defence and the 12th Commander of the Royal Brunei Land Forces (RBLF) in 2022. Additionally, he was among the contingent attached to the International Monitoring Team (IMT) in Mindanao.

== Early life and education ==
Abdul Razak was born on 21 March 1972. He started his career on 21 September 1989, when he joined the Royal Brunei Armed Forces and was designated as an Officer cadet in 1994. In 1994 and 1995, he participated in Officer Cadet Training at the Royal Military College in Sungai Besi, Kuala Lumpur, Malaysia. Shortly after, he was appointed a Second lieutenant. He graduated with a master's degree from the University of Balochistan in Pakistan in 2010 after completing his command and staff course at the Command and Staff College Quetta. He attended the Philippine National Defence College and received a master's degree in national security administration in September 2016.

== Military career ==
During Abdul Razak's time in the RBAF, he held a variety of positions, including those of platoon commander, armoured reconnaissance troop leader, adjutant, squadron second-in-command, company commander, armoured reconnaissance squadron commander, battalion second-in-command, and staff officer grade one at the Ministry of Defence.

As part of his internationally tour of duty, Major Abdul Razak was among Brunei's IMT contingent Batch 2 in 2005–2006 to observe the progress of the negotiations for peace between the Government of the Philippines and the Moro Islamic Liberation Front in Mindanao, Southern Philippines. On 13 October 2008, the Brunei contingent commander, along with four other former leaders and thirty-six members of the team, including him, received plaques and certificates of appreciation from the Philippine government for their assistance in keeping an eye on the peace process in Mindanao.

He received a promotion to lieutenant colonel in 2012, and from 2013 to 2016 he served as Sultan Hassanal Bolkiah's aide-de-camp. On 1 January 2018, he assumed leadership of the Directorship at the Defence Minister's Office and Directorate of Strategic Planning. Later that year on 13 July, he was elevated to the rank of colonel. On 24 July 2020, Abdul Razak was promoted to brigadier general with the approval of the Sultan of Brunei. On 28 August 2020, he assumed command as Joint Force Commander of the RBAF. On 1 March 2022, he was then named Commander of the RBLF, therefore replacing Haszaimi Bol Hassan and becoming the 12th commander of the branch.

== Political career ==
Dato Razak was appointed as the Deputy Minister of Defense during the 2022 cabinet reshuffle on 7 June. On 5 July of that same year, Chinese Ambassador Yu Hong met with him, and was congratulated by Ambassador Yu on his new position. She would then go on to praise the successes of the two countries' relations. On 3 February 2023, State Defense Minister Toshiro Ino met with him, and witnessed the signing of a Memorandum of Cooperation between the Ministry of Defense of Japan and the Ministry of Defence of Brunei Darussalam on Defense Cooperation and Exchanges. His time as deputy minister was short lived as his appointment was terminated alongside his position being abolished by the command of Sultan Hassanal Bolkiah on 27 February 2023.

== Diplomatic career ==
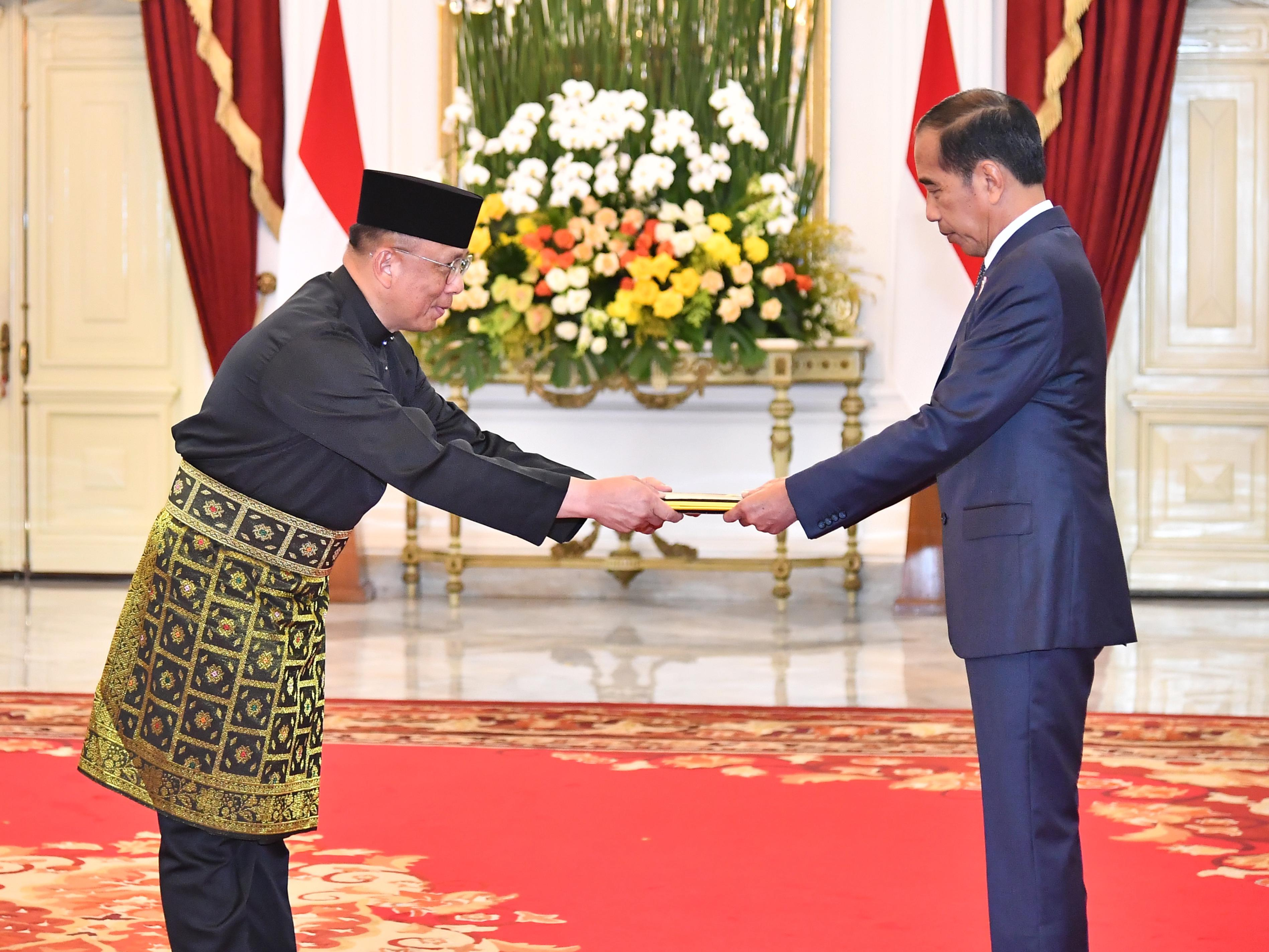
Dato Razak presenting his credentials to President Joko Widodo in 2024

As the new Brunei ambassador to Indonesia, Sultan Hassanal Bolkiah presented the credentials to Dato Razak at the Istana Nurul Iman on 17 February 2024. On 8 August, he along with 9 other ambassadors presented the credentials to President Joko Widodo in a ceremony at the Istana Merdeka, Jakarta. During an interview, he expressed his commitment to continue to improve diplomatic relations between Indonesia and Brunei which includes defence, people-to-people exchanges, trade, and labour.

== Personal life ==
Abdul Razak has a son and two daughters from his marriage to Datin Hajah Maimunah binti Haji Bakar. He likes to travel and play golf.

== Honours ==
The PJG was given to Dato Razak in appreciation of his unwavering dedication and exceptional efforts to boost the defence relations and professional cooperation between the RBLF and the Singapore Army. Abdul Razak also given the following honours:

=== National ===
- Order of Pahlawan Negara Brunei First Class (PSPNB; 15 July 2021) – Dato Seri Pahlawan
- Order of Setia Negara Brunei Fourth Class (PSB; 2002)
- Meritorious Service Medal (PJK; 2008)
- Sultan of Brunei Silver Jubilee Medal (5 October 1992)
- Sultan of Brunei Golden Jubilee Medal (5 October 2017)
- General Service Medal (Armed Forces)
- Long Service Medal and Good Conduct (PKLPB)
- Royal Brunei Armed Forces Golden Jubilee Medal (31 May 2011)
- Royal Brunei Armed Forces Diamond Jubilee Medal (31 May 2021)

=== Foreign ===
- Singapore:
  - Pingat Jasa Gemilang (Tentera) (PJG; 1 September 2022)

Diplomatic posts
Preceded by Yussof Abdul Rahman	Ambassador of Brunei to Indonesia; 17 February 2024 – present	Incumbent
Political offices
Preceded by Office reconvened	5th Deputy Minister of Defence; 7 June 2022 – 27 February 2023	Succeeded by Office abolished
Military offices
Preceded by Haszaimi Bol Hassan	12th Commander of the Royal Brunei Land Forces; 1 March 2022 – 10 June 2022	Succeeded by Saifulrizal Abdul Latif
Preceded by Mohammad Sharif	Joint Force Commander of the Royal Brunei Armed Forces; 28 August 2020 – 25 February 2022	Succeeded by Alirupendi
