= Haszaimi Bol Hassan =

Bruneian military officer

Major General Dato Paduka Seri Haszaimi Bol Hassan PSPNB DPKT SMB PIKB PGAT
- محمد هسزعيمي بول حسن
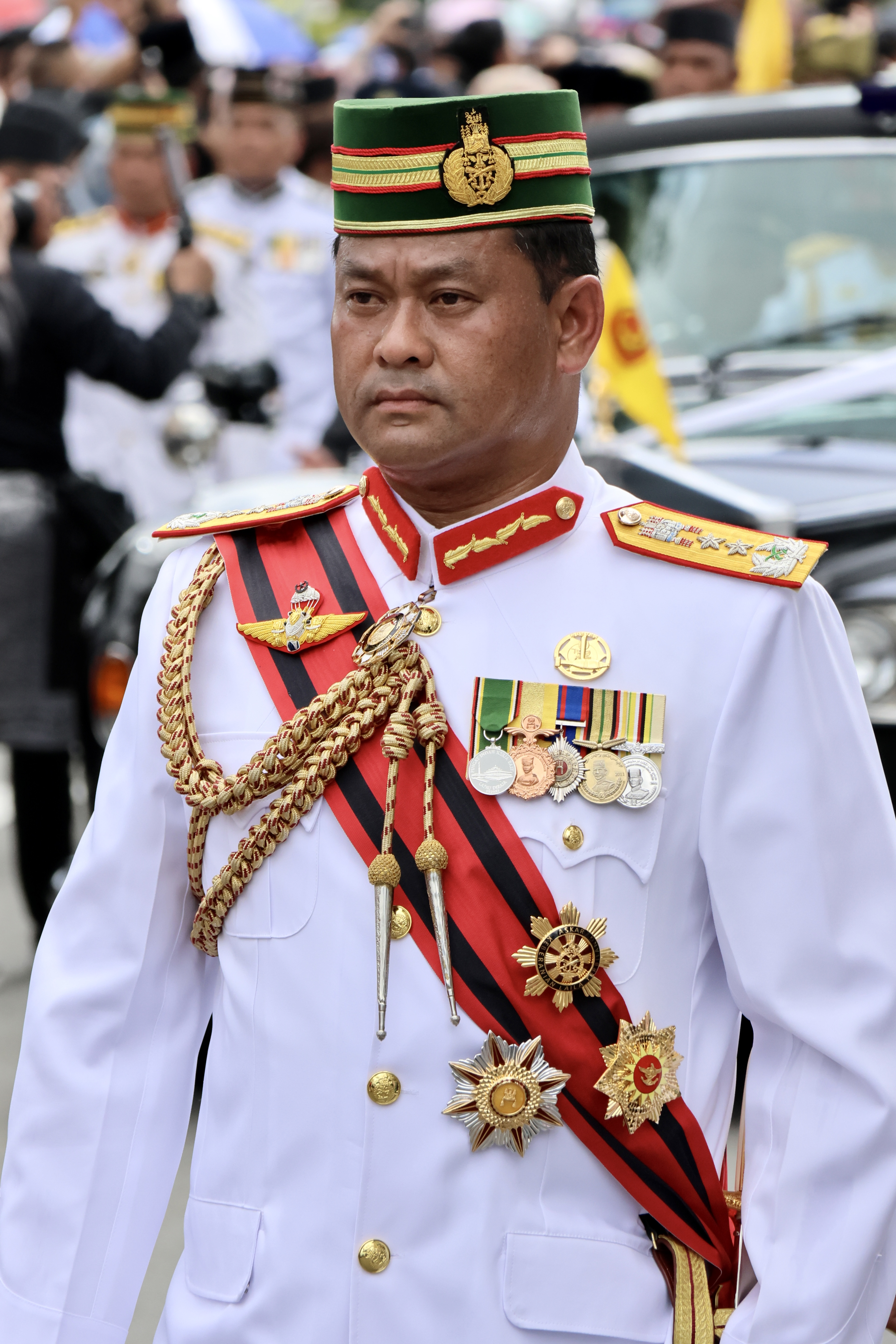
- Major General Haszaimi in 2024

12th Commander of the Royal Brunei Armed Forces
- Incumbent
- Assumed office 1 March 2022
- Monarch: Hassanal Bolkiah
- Deputy: Mohammad Sharif Ibrahim
- Preceded by: Hamzah Sahat

11th Commander of the Royal Brunei Land Force
- In office 30 July 2020 – 1 March 2022
- Deputy: Azman Bangkol
- Preceded by: Khairul Hamed
- Succeeded by: Abdul Razak

Personal details
- Born: Brunei
- Education: National University of Singapore; Harvard Kennedy School
- Profession: Military officer

Military service
- Allegiance: Brunei
- Branch/service: Royal Brunei Land Force
- Years of service: 1993–present
- Rank: Major General
- Commands: Royal Brunei Armed Forces; Royal Brunei Land Force; Defence Academy RBAF; Training Institute RBAF; RBLF Deputy Commander

Muhammad Haszaimi bin Bol Hassan is a Bruneian military officer who currently holds the position as the 12th Commander of the Royal Brunei Armed Forces (RBAF) since 2022. He previously held the position of the 11th Commander of the Royal Brunei Land Force (RBLF) from 2020 to 2022.

== Education ==
Throughout Haszaimi's career, he was sent to several training institutes, which include the Officer Cadet School at Waiouru in New Zealand in 1994, the Intermediate Staff Course (ISC) at the Land Warfare Centre at Canungra in Australia in 1999, the Australian Command and Staff Course (ACSC) at the Australian Defence College, Canberra in Australia in 2007, Royal College of Defence Studies (RCDS) at London in England from 2012 to 2013, Stanford-NUS Executive Development in International Management in Singapore during August 2015, attended the Senior Executives in National and International Security at the Harvard Kennedy School in the United States in 2016.

== Military career ==
In June 1993, Haszaimi enlisted into the Royal Brunei Armed Forces (RBAF), and after completion of Initial Officer Training, graduated with the rank of second lieutenant. He became an Infantry Platoon Commander in the Third Battalion, Royal Brunei Land Force (RBLF), followed by several other appointments, including a Mortar Platoon Commander, Adjutant, Infantry Company Commander, and Officer Commanding at the School of Infantry. Moreover, he was an instructor for non-commissioned officers and junior commissioned officers at the Training Institute RBAF.

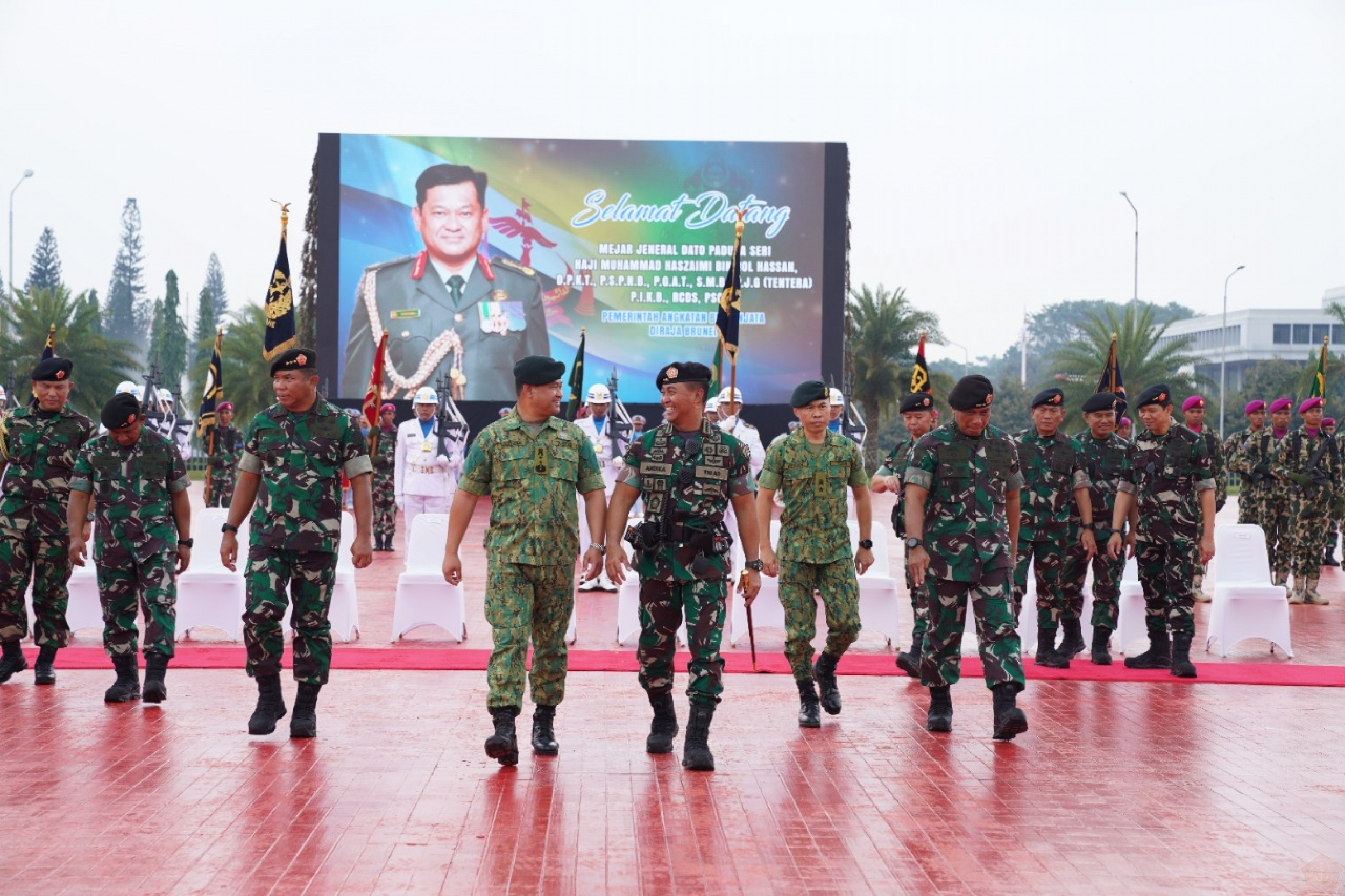
Haszaimi and Andika during his visit to TNI Headquarters in 2022.

Upon Haszaimi's return from Australia, the Ministry of Defence would post him as the Military Assistant to the Deputy Minister of Defence in 2008. In 2010, he would then be promoted to the rank of lieutenant colonel while as the commandant of the Second Battalion RBLF from 2009 to 2011. That following year, he became a Military Assistant to the 8th Commander of RBAF, Aminuddin Ihsan. Graduating from Royal College of Defence Studies (RCDS), he would then be posted to the chief of staff of the RBLF in September 2013, and in May 2014, promoted to a rank of colonel. From 2014 to 2018, he would become the deputy commander of the RBLF and later that year, assumed command of the Training Institute RBAF. After this, his command would then again be changed to the Defence Academy RBAF.

Afterwards, Colonel Haszaimi was again promoted to the rank of brigadier general on 24 July 2020m and six days later, became the 11th Commander of the RBLF. During the farewell to Lt. Col. Dan Hauser, the Australian Defence Adviser to Brunei Darussalam, Commander Haszaimi showed his appreciation to his service in upholding cooperation between the two nations. He would be succeeded by Abdul Razak Abdul Kadir on 1 March 2022. Major General Haszaimi paid General Andika Perkasa a courtesy visit on 12 May 2022 at Indonesian National Armed Forces (TNI) Headquarters in Cilangkap, East Jakarta. On his working visit, he aimed to improve relations between the RBAF and TNI. Later on 24 November, he chaired the 21st ASEAN Chiefs of Army Multilateral Meeting (ACAMM).

On 1 March 2022, Haszaimi was finally promoted to major general and appointed by Sultan Hassanal Bolkiah to be the 12th Commander of the RBAF during a ceremony held at the Istana Nurul Iman, Bandar Seri Begawan. To improve military collaboration between the Indonesian Army and the RBLF, General Dudung Abdurachman paid a working visit to Brunei on 13 March 2023. In addition to paying a courtesy call on the commander of the RBLF, General Dudung also visited Major General Haszaimi, and took a tour of the RBAF Museum at Bolkiah Garrison.

== Personal life ==
Muhammad Haszaimi is married to Ummisyafinah binti Haji Zaini, and has four children together. In addition, he enjoys reading in his free time.

== Honours ==
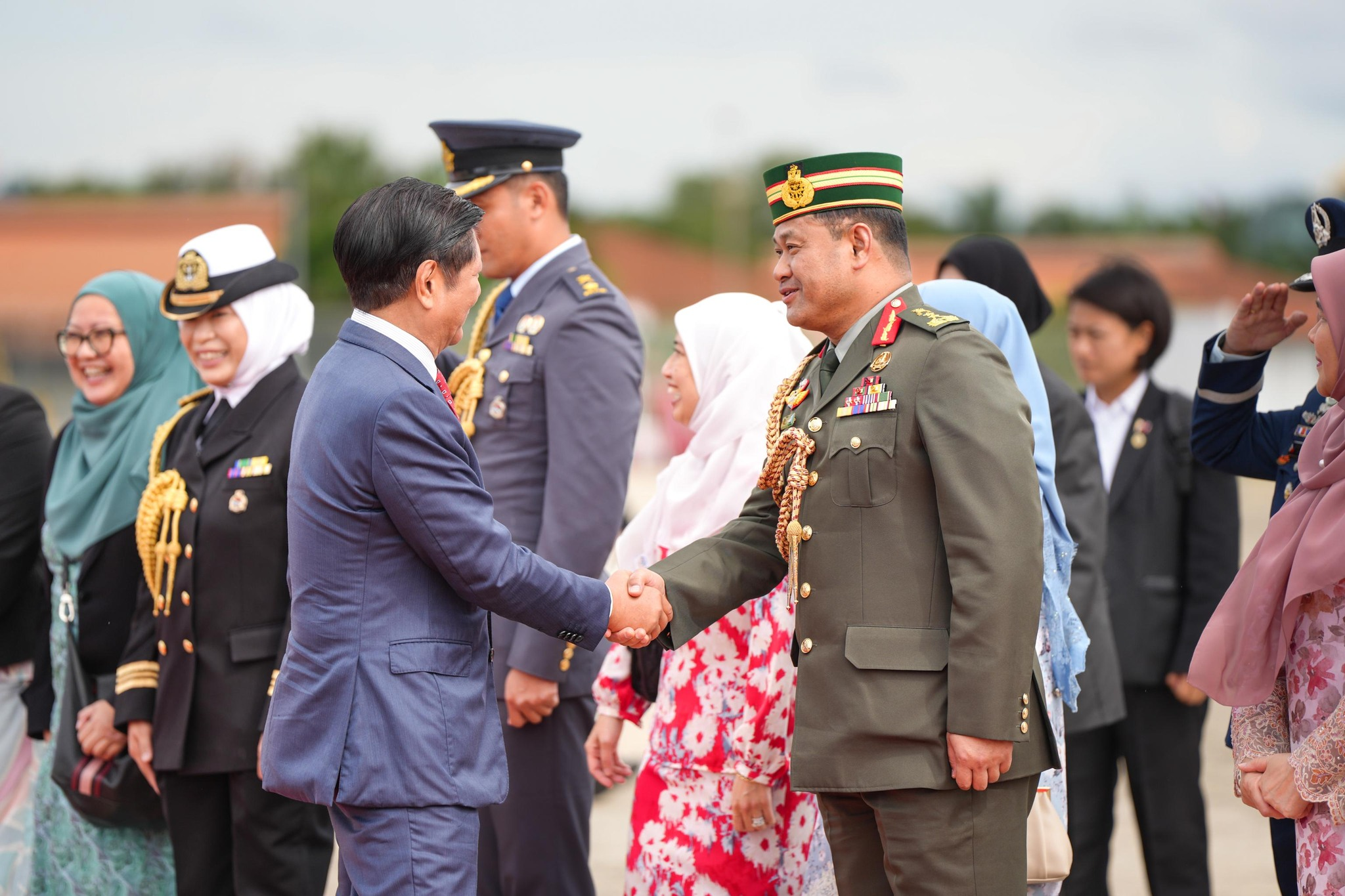
Hazaimi welcoming President Bongbong Marcos in 2024

=== National ===
- Order of Pahlawan Negara Brunei First Class (PSPNB; 15 July 2021) – Dato Seri Pahlawan
- Order of Paduka Keberanian Laila Terbilang First Class (DPKT; 15 July 2022) – Dato Paduka Seri
- Order of Seri Paduka Mahkota Brunei Third Class (SMB; 2012)
- Excellent Service Medal (PIKB; 2005)
- Sultan of Brunei Golden Jubilee Medal (5 October 2017)
- General Service Medal (Armed Forces)
- Long Service Medal and Good Conduct (PKLPB)
- Royal Brunei Armed Forces Golden Jubilee Medal (31 May 2011)
- Royal Brunei Armed Forces Diamond Jubilee Medal (31 May 2021)

=== Foreign ===
- Singapore:
  - Darjah Utama Bakti Cemerlang (Tentera) (DUBC; 2 August 2024)
  - Pingat Jasa Gemilang (Tentera) (PJG; 14 June 2022)
- Malaysia:
  - Courageous Commander of The Most Gallant Order of Military Service (PGAT; 18 October 2022)
- Thailand:
  - Knight Grand Cross of the Order of the Crown of Thailand (PM (GCCT); 6 June 2025)
  - Honorary Parachutist Badge (June 2023)
- France:
  - Recipient of the National Defence Medal (Gold Grade) (27 February 2026)

Military offices
| Preceded by Hamzah Sahat | 12th Commander of the Royal Brunei Armed Forces; 1 March 2022 – present | Succeeded by Incumbent |
| Preceded by Khairul Hamed | 11th Commander of the Royal Brunei Land Force; 30 July 2020 – 28 February 2022 | Succeeded by Abdul Razak |
| Preceded by Khairul Hamed | 22nd Commander of the Training Institute; 19 March 2018 – 10 December 2008 | Succeeded by Shafiee Duraman |
| Preceded by Pengiran Aminan (Acting) | Deputy Commander of the Royal Brunei Land Force; 1 December 2014 – 19 March 2018 | Succeeded by Damit Bakar |
