= Tutong Camp =

Military base in Brunei

- Kem Tutong كيم توتوڠ
- Pekan Tutong, Tutong in Brunei
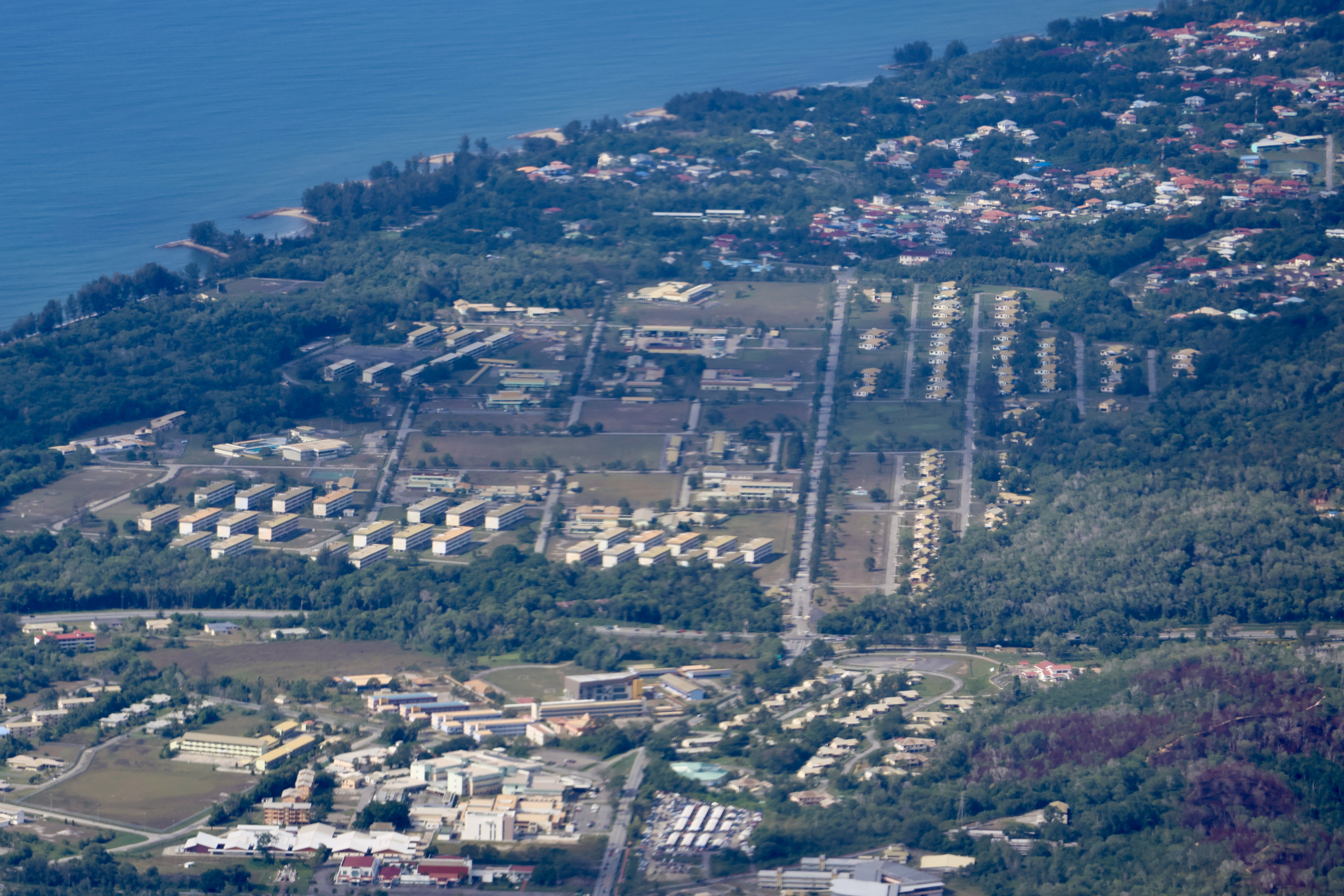
- Aerial view of the base in 2023

Site information
- Type: Military training base
- Owner: Ministry of Defence
- Operator: Royal Brunei Land Force
- Condition: Operational
- Website: land.mindef.gov.bn

Location
- Location in Brunei
- Coordinates: 4°49′39″N 114°40′12″E

Site history
- Built: 1976; 50 years ago
- In use: 1976–present

Garrison information
- Garrison: RBLF Second Battalion

Tutong Camp (Malay: Kem Tutong) is one of the military bases of the Royal Brunei Land Force (RBLF), and it is also home to the RBLF Second Battalion (2Bn). The RBLF have two garrisons of army and military police stationed in the Tutong District, namely the Tutong and Penanjong Camp, as well as a shooting range in Binturan.

It can be noted that the camp was previously referred to as Royal Brunei Malay Regiment (RBMR) Camp, Tutong. In 2021, the population was 1,213.

== History ==
The military base was completed by late April 1976, and later on 10 May 1976, the 2Bn officially moved into Tutong Camp after being temporarily based at Bolkiah Camp. A total of six blocks of flats within the camp were scheduled to be completed on 26 November 1978. On 2 September 1965, the 22nd Special Air Service (22 SAS) undergone a month long training period at the camp. The Sultan Hassanal Bolkiah presented the Royal Brunei Armed Forces with scented water during a ceremony at the Tutong Camp Parade Ground on 12 July 1994.

The Tutong District tug-of-war competition was held at the Tutong Camp Sports Complex for the competition's final match on 10 July 2005. A fire was put out on the 3rd floor of a barrack with no injuries reported on 21 March 2015. Floods caused by heavy rain on 7 December 2019, prompt the Tutong District Disaster Management Committee (DDMC) to identify both Tutong and Penanjong Camps to be used as a place of refuge. Delegation from the Ministry of Defence was participated in the Fardu Maghrib prayer at the camp's Surau Pengiran Ratna Indera on 14 April 2022.

== Facilities ==
Tutong Camp Primary School comprises three two-storey blocks. One block is designated for administrative purposes, while the other two house 22 classrooms. To accommodate the growing needs of the school, several classrooms have been converted into a computer lab and a science lab. Additionally, the school offers basic facilities, including parking spaces for teachers and guardians, a library, a canteen, and a kitchen. A morning assembly area is also provided for students and teachers. At its inception, the school had only four teachers provided by the Department of Education, but the number has since grown due to increasing student enrolment. As of 2002, the school employs 27 teachers and one teacher from the Centre for British Teachers, catering to 349 students—178 boys and 171 girls—from grades I to IV.

There are several facilities built within the base:

- Tutong Camp Sports Complex
- Tutong Camp Drill Square
- Tutong Camp Parade Ground
- Tutong Camp Religious School
- Surau Pengiran Ratna Indera
