= Muhammad Wata =

Bruneian military officer (born 1975)

Colonel Muhammad Wata SMB PJK
- محمد وات
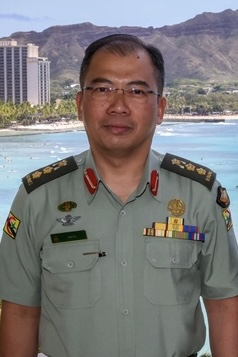
- Wata in 2025
- Born: Muhammad Wata bin Abdullah Awat; 20 March 1975 (age 51); Brunei
- Military career
- Allegiance: Brunei
- Branch: Royal Brunei Land Force
- Service years: 1996–present
- Rank: Colonel
- Service number: 497
- Units: Second Battalion RBLF; Third Battalion RBLF; International Monitoring Team defence attaché of Brunei to the Philippines
- Commands: Second Battalion RBLF; Deputy Commander of the Royal Brunei Land Force

Muhammad Wata bin Abdullah Awat (born 20 March 1975), simply known as Wata, is a Bruneian military officer who served as the current Deputy Commander of the Royal Brunei Land Force (RBLF) since 2022. Additionally, he was among the contingent attached to the International Monitoring Team (IMT) in Mindanao.

== Military career ==
On 18 April 1996, Wata enlisted in the Royal Brunei Armed Forces (RBAF). On 4 November 1996, he was commissioned as an officer cadet after completing the basic recruit training. On 4 February 1998, he was commissioned as a second lieutenant after completing his Officer Cadet Course in Singapore with distinction. In 1998, he served as an infantry platoon commander with 'G' Company of the Second Battalion RBLF (2Bn RBLF). In the UK, he participated in the Platoon Commander Battle Course. After that, he went to Training Team Brunei (TTB) Seria for the Jungle Warfare Long Range Patrol training. Later, in late December 1998, he went to Changi Air Base, Singapore, for the 154th Airborne training.

In Admin Company 2Bn RBLF, he worked as a motor transport officer before being appointed to the rank of lieutenant in 2001. After being elevated to the rank of captain in 2002, Wata was assigned to the Third Battalion RBLF (3Bn RBLF) as the officer commanding of the mortar platoon. He completed the UK-based 81 mm Mortar Platoon Commander Course in 2003. After that, from 2005 to 2006, he served as an adjutant of the 3Bn RBLF. He participated in the Junior Staff Course at Civil Service Institute (IPA), Gadong, in 2005. He served with the 3rd RBAF Contingent IMT in Mindanao, Philippines, from September 2006 to September 2007, gaining operational experience.

As part of his internationally tour of duty, Major Wata was among Brunei's IMT contingent Batch 3 in 2006–2007 to observe the progress of the negotiations for peace between the Government of the Philippines and the Moro Islamic Liberation Front in Mindanao, Southern Philippines. On 13 October 2008, the Brunei contingent commander, along with four other former leaders and thirty-six members of the team, including him, received plaques and certificates of appreciation from the Philippine government for their assistance in keeping an eye on the peace process in Mindanao.

Wata was given a promotion to Major in 2007 and served as the officer commanding of 'A' Company of the 2Bn RBLF till 2011. 2009 saw the completion in Singapore of his officer commanding's Course and Advance Infantry's Officer Course. He participated in the Grade 2 Command and Staff Course in 2010, which took place in Canungra, Australia. He completed the Command and Staff Course at the Defence Academy RBAF in 2012 after being appointed officer commanding of the Recruit Company at the Training Institute RBAF in 2011. After finishing, he assumed command of the 2Bn RBLF as second-in-command, serving in that capacity from November 2012 to October 2014.

With Sultan Hassanal Bolkiah's approval, he was elevated to the rank of lieutenant colonel on 6 February 2015, and designated as the commanding officer of the 2Bn RBLF. He attended the 13th Executive Development Program on Public Policy and Management in 2016. Later, he was given the chance to be assigned as a defence attaché in the country from 2017 to 2020.

He assumed leadership of the RBLF as Deputy Commander on 20 October 2022, succeeding Colonel Azman bin Haji Bangkol. On 6 November 2022, in Hanoi, Vietnam, he participated the 30th ASEAN Armies Rifle Meet (AARM) 2022. He was again present in the Infantry Center, Fort Thanarat, Thailand, for the 31st ASEAN Armies Rifle Meet (AARM) in 2023.

== Personal life ==
Wata is married to Lieutenant Colonel Siti Norlelawati binti Haji Emran, and they have three daughters and a son. He enjoys fishing and playing sports such as sepak takraw, volleyball, football, badminton, and others.

== Honours ==
Wata has earned the following honours;

National

- Order of Seri Paduka Mahkota Brunei Third Class (SMB; 15 July 2023)
- Meritorious Service Medal (PJK; 2012)
- Sultan of Brunei Golden Jubilee Medal (5 October 2017)
- General Service Medal
- Royal Brunei Armed Forces Golden Jubilee Medal (31 May 2011)
- Royal Brunei Armed Forces Diamond Jubilee Medal (31 May 2021)

Foreign

- Philippines:
  - Military Civic Action Medal (2007)

Military offices
| Preceded by Azman Bangkol | Deputy Commander of the Royal Brunei Land Force; 20 October 2022 – present | Succeeded by Incumbent |
