= Bolkiah Garrison =

Military base in Brunei

- Bolkiah Garison بلقیة ڬاريسون
- Berakas 'A', Bandar Seri Begawan, Brunei-Muara in Brunei
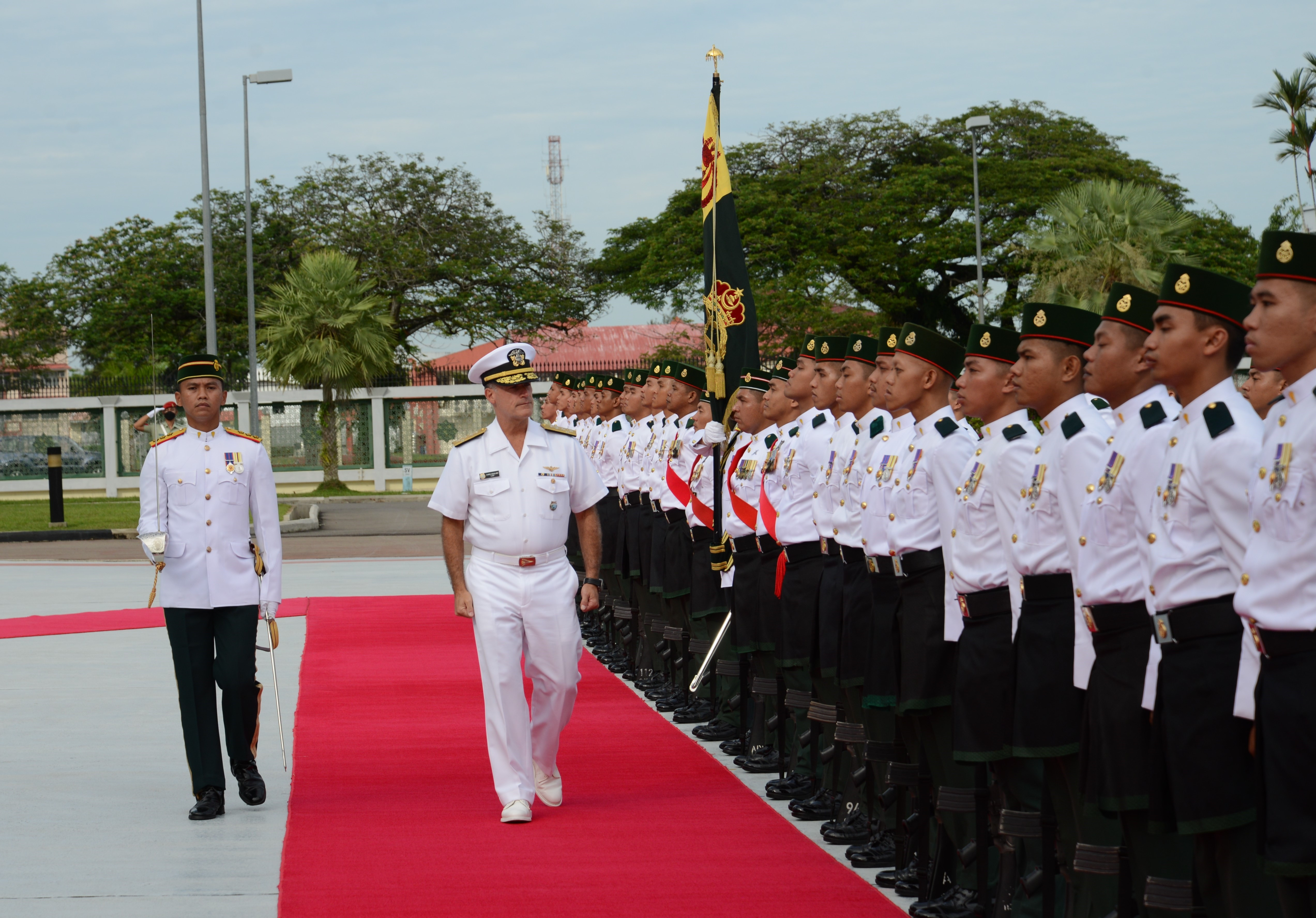
- Honours ceremony being carried out at the base in 2022

Site information
- Type: Military headquarters and training base
- Owner: Ministry of Defence
- Operator: Royal Brunei Armed Forces
- Condition: Operational

Location
- Location in Brunei
- Coordinates: 04°55′34″N 114°56′07″E

Site history
- Built: 1964; 62 years ago (as Bolkiah Camp)
- In use: 1964–present

Garrison information
- Garrison: Ministry of Defence; Joint Force Headquarters; Logistic Depot; Medical and Health Services; Commander of the Royal Brunei Armed Forces
- Occupants: Second Battalion RBLF

Bolkiah Garrison (Malay: Bolkiah Garison), also referred to as Bolkiah Camp from its original name, is one of the military bases in Mukim Berakas 'A', Bandar Seri Begawan. It contains the main building for the Ministry of Defence (MinDef), and is also the headquarters of the Royal Brunei Armed Forces (RBAF). International defence collaborations, meetings and bilateral exercises are planned and considered within this military base.

== History ==
Eight officers and sixteen warrant officers made up the cadre strength of the British expatriate section in the seconded personnel region by the middle of 1964. Simultaneously, plans were underway to construct a new British Forces Brunei (BFB) and Gurkha camp around 6 miles (9.7 km) from the Brunei Malay Regiment (BMR) Berakas Camp, close to the Brunei Airport. The new camp, which the Sultan Hassanal Bolkiah called Bolkiah Camp, was built to hold the Brigade Headquarters and related troops and could hold 700–800 men.

The Training Wing Depot was established at Bolkiah Camp on 7 April 1969, but it would later be relocated to Penanjong Garrison in the Tutong District in 1991. On the fourteenth anniversary of the Royal Brunei Malay Regiment's (RBMR) formation, the 2nd Battalion was formed following nearly two years of training on 2 January 1975. The new battalion needed a larger camp than the Berakas Camp could provide, so it relocated to the former British Reinforcement Camp in Bolkiah Camp. On 10 May 1976, the 2nd Battalion finally moved into its permanent camp in Tutong Camp. As of 1995, there was a small garrison based at Bolkiah Camp alongside British commanding officers to provide training the local soldiers of the Royal Brunei Malay Regiment (RBMR).

In 2008, now known as Bolkiah Garrison, plans were made to upgrade the base's surau, create a new building for the RBAF Museum, and provide housing for RBAF personnel. The Medical Reception Station (MRS) designed by architects at ALD Consultants was officially opened in 2018. On 21 March 2019, at the newly built Bolkiah Gymnasium and Multi-Purpose Hall, the Royal Brunei Armed Forces (RBAF) hosted the launching ceremony for the upgrading of the RBAF's Identification Card and Security Enhancement Expo in upholding Wawasan Brunei 2035. One of the attempts to strengthen the security system in the RBAF is the upgrading of the identification card. During RBAF's 58th anniversary on 30 June 2019, 1,058 service personnel from all three service branches of the RBAF participated in an annual parade held within Bolkiah Garrison.

== Facilities ==
There are several facilities built within Bolkiah Garrison:

- Ministry of Defence building
- Joint Force Headquarters
- Officer's Mess
- Medical Reception Station
- Bolkiah Gymnasium and Multi-purpose Hall
- Performance Optimisation Centre (POC)
- Dewan Gerak Badan (Body Motion Hall)
- Surau Ad-Difa'
- Sultan Haji Hassanal Bolkiah Institute of Defence & Strategic Studies Library, Bolkiah Garrison
- Royal Brunei Armed Forces Museum

== Gallery ==
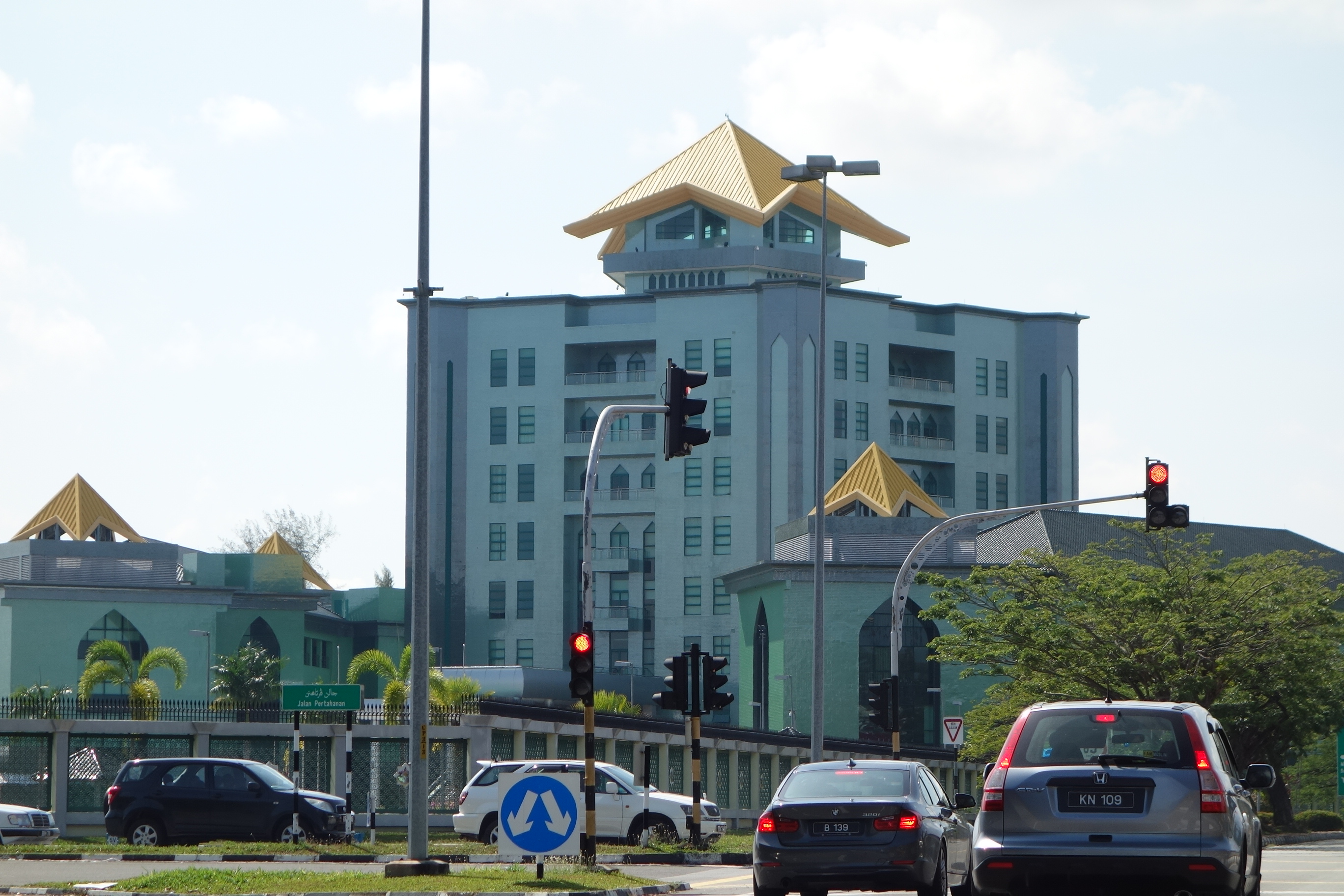
Ministry of Defence building

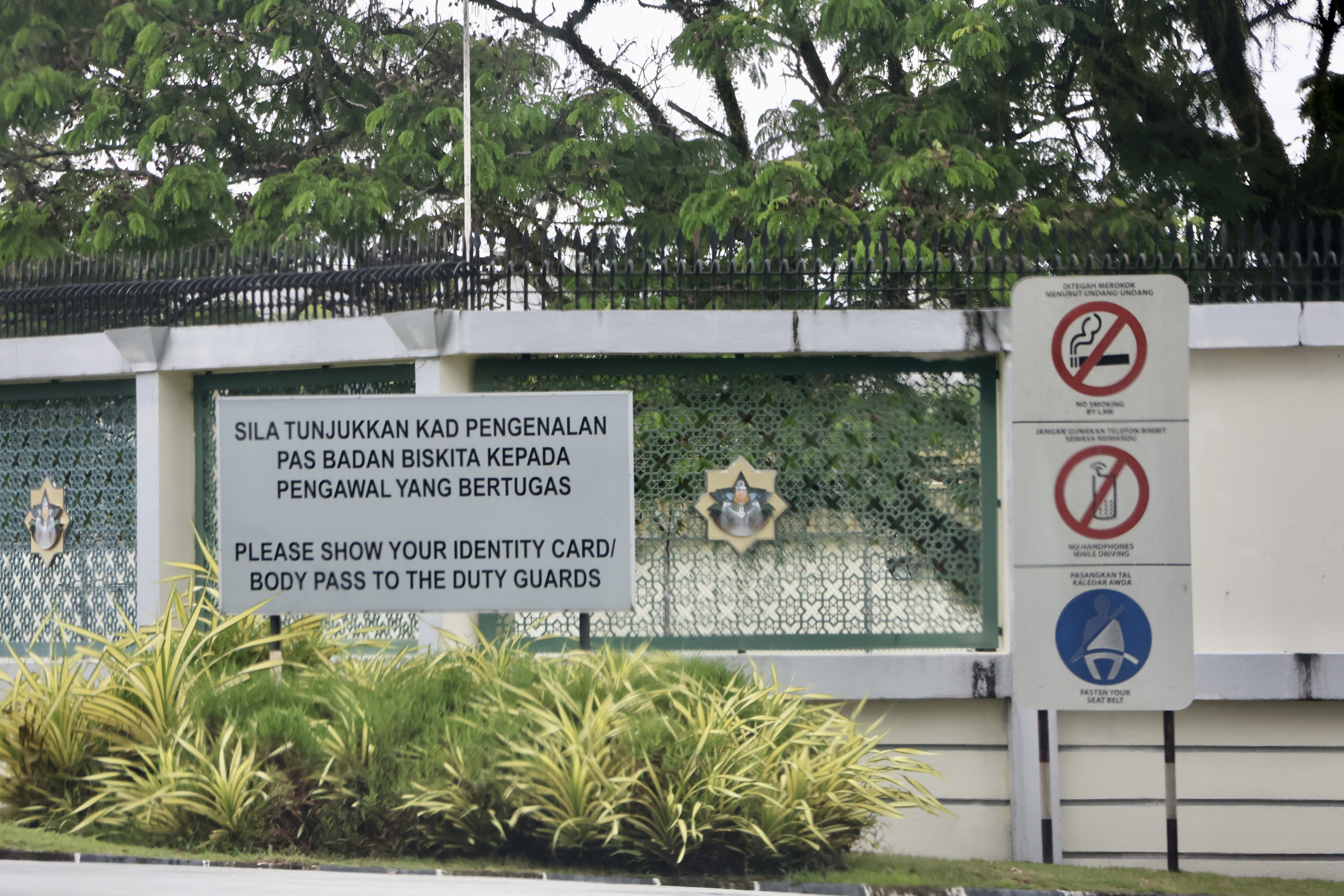
Bolkiah Garrison's main gate sign

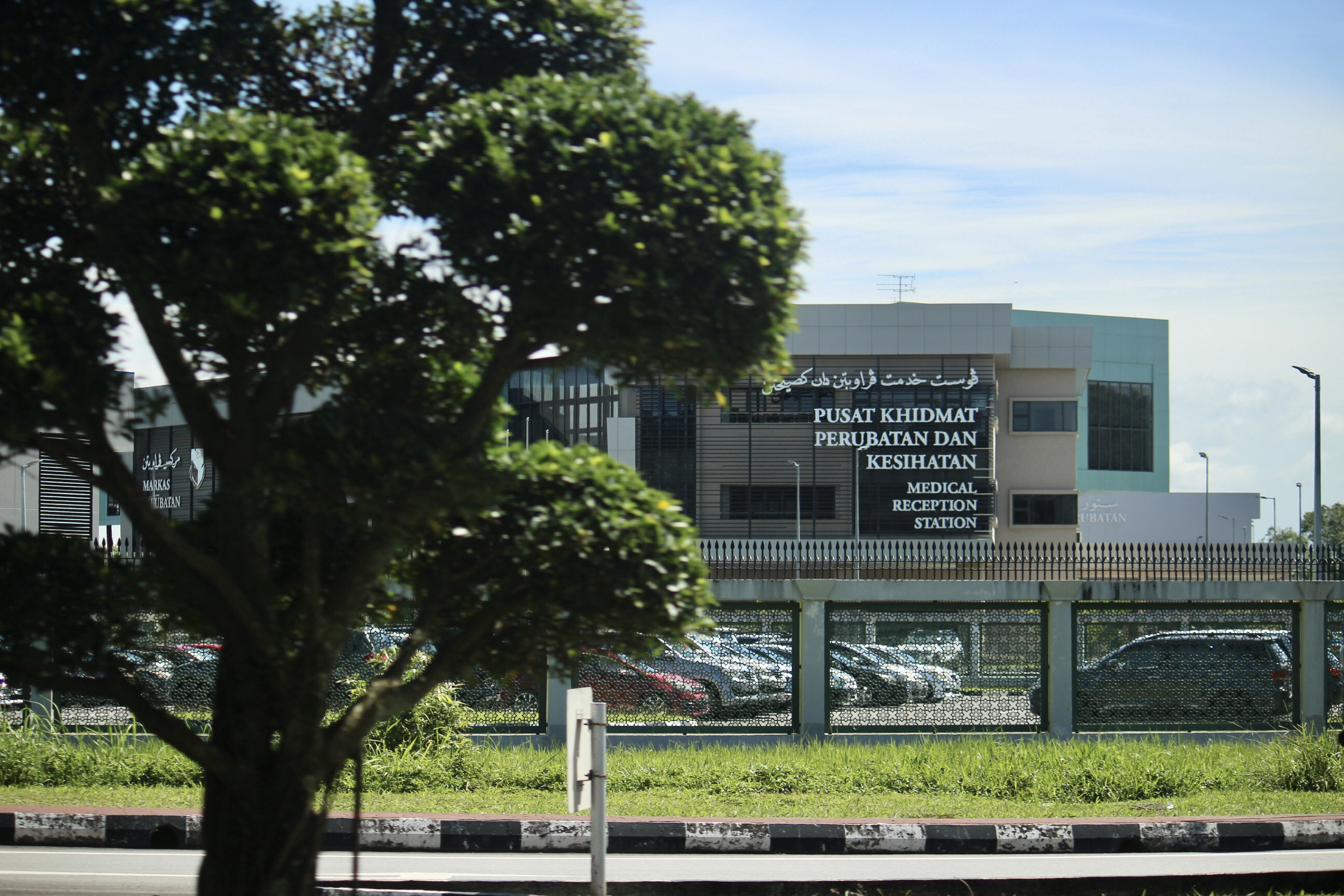
Medical Reception Station

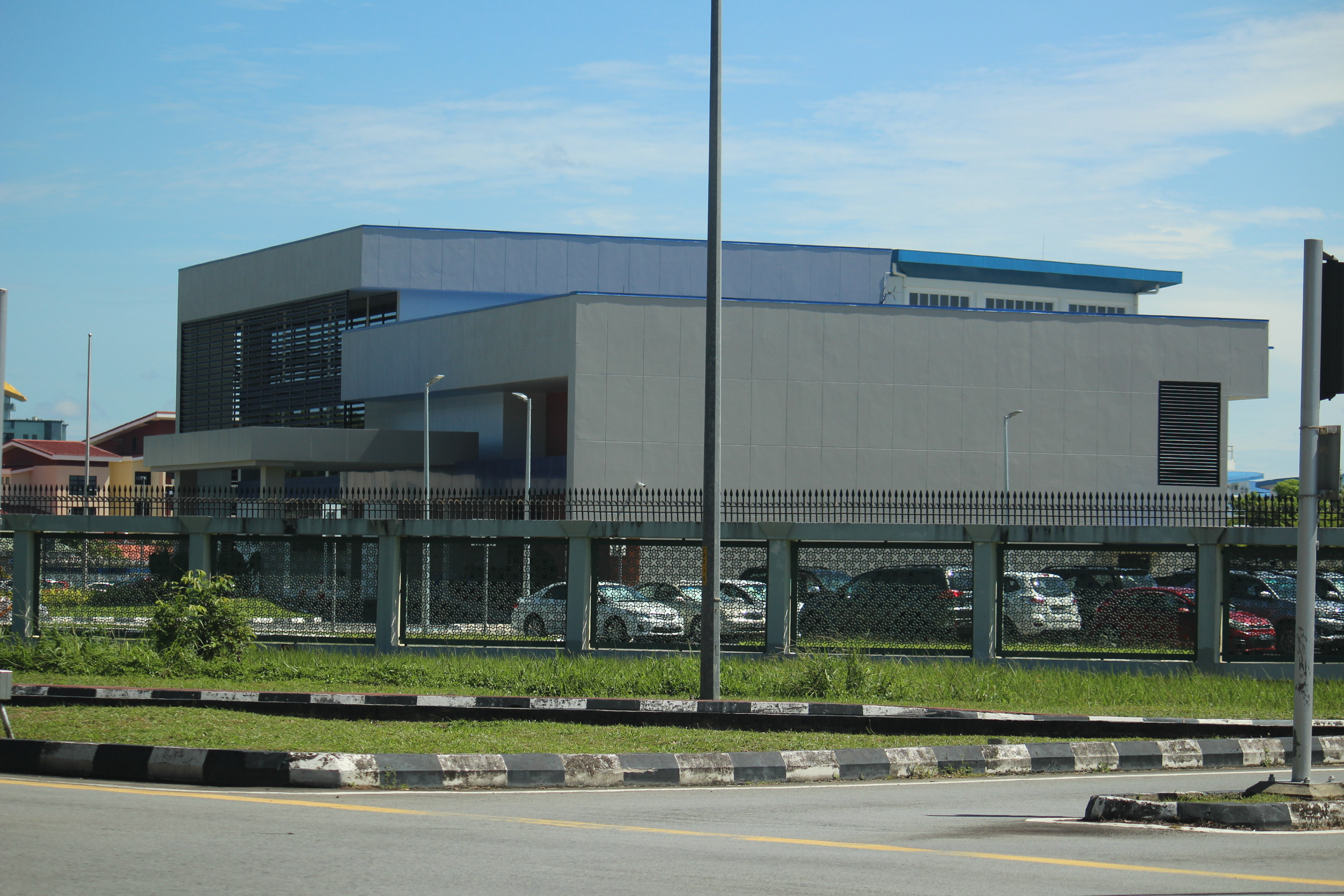
RBAF Recruitment Office
