= Joint Force Headquarters, Royal Brunei Armed Forces =

Joint military command of the Royal Brunei Armed Forces

- Malay: Markas Angkatan Bersama; Jawi: مركس اڠكتن برسام
- Founded: 14 December 2007 (18 years, 10 months)
- Country: Brunei Darussalam
- Allegiance: Sultan Hassanal Bolkiah
- Branch: Royal Brunei Land Force; Royal Brunei Navy; Royal Brunei Air Force
- Type: Unified combatant command
- Part of: Ministry of Defence Brunei Darussalam; Royal Brunei Armed Forces
- Headquarters: Ministry of Defence, Bolkiah Garrison, Bandar Seri Begawan, Brunei-Muara District, BB3510, Brunei Darussalam
- Anniversaries: 14 December
- Website: JFHQ.MinDef.gov.bn

Commanders
- Commander: Col Pengiran Noor Rumaizi
- Deputy Commander: Captain Khairil Abdul Rahman
- Chief of Staff: Lt.Col Muhammad Suwardi Ariffin
- Sergeant Major: WO1 Sahrol Omar

The Joint Force Headquarters, Royal Brunei Armed Forces (JFHQ RBAF), Malay: Markas Angkatan Bersama Angkatan Tentera Diraja Brunei (MAB ABDB), Jawi: مركس اڠكتن برسام, is a combined military command that was established expressly to oversee all joint operations activities of the service branches of the Royal Brunei Armed Forces (RBAF / ABDB). At least three services, including the Royal Brunei Land Force (RBLF), Royal Brunei Navy (RBN), and Royal Brunei Air Force (RBAirF), participate in joint operations.

== Background ==
In order to utilise, monitor, and coordinate Royal Brunei Armed Forces activities, and to unify all service personnel under a single command for any military action, the Royal Brunei Armed Forces Joint Operations Centre (RBAF JOC) functions as the primary Command and Control (C2) hub. The JOC, which has permanent personnel for joint planning and execution, guarantees that the RBAF can use cutting-edge technology to react quickly to changing circumstances, and is always ready to monitor military actions and prepare for larger-scale operations.

== History ==
The Royal Brunei Armed Forces Joint Operations Command (RBAF JOC), which was established to combine all elements of the Royal Brunei Armed Forces for military operations or exercises, was the previous name of the JFHQ. The RBAF JOC was established in 1997 for a major joint exercise. Since then, it has served as the Command and Control (C2) hub. Its duties have grown to accommodate the RBAF's commitments, with a focus on unified command for operations.

It has been determined that in order to provide unified C2, the JOC must be upgraded to a JFHQ with permanent staff. The then current JOC, which lacked permanent and properly trained staff, had been effective; however, as Royal Brunei Armed Forces commitments increase and operations become longer, it would be necessary to revise its core principles in order to align with the Defence White Paper Update 2007's vision and make use of existing technology to respond quickly to evolving circumstances.

Reorganisation was necessary due to the RBAF's increased dimension in order to create a permanent JFHQ that would command the assigned force from the JOC and have full staff duties for joint planning and execution of operations. The JOC would be staffed 24 hours a day, to monitor all military actions by the Royal Brunei Armed Forces, and to be ready for larger-scale missions. As a result, on 14 December 2007, the Joint Force Headquarters, Royal Brunei Armed Forces (JFHQ RBAF) was established, and is now housed on the second floor of the Ministry of Defence Building at Bolkiah Garrison.

== Roles ==
Assist the Joint Force Commander (JFC) and the component commanders in organising, leading, and carrying out a variety of tactical-level actions (the commander of the designated unit or units will maintain tactical control). Serve as the RBAF's main point of contact for other governmental ministries and agencies, as well as allied and other foreign joint operations headquarters. Under a fully operational JFHQ, the Commander of the Royal Brunei Armed Forces would delegate to the JFC the following responsibilities:

- All Royal Brunei Armed Forces mission planning and execution;
- Operational-level command and control of all joint and / or combined (international) operations and exercises;
- The use of allotted Royal Brunei Armed Forces assets.

The Service Commanders would concentrate only on raising, training, and maintaining the assets under their command for operational readiness, with the JFC handling the employment and deployment of allotted RBAF forces. JFHQ's permanent employees are in charge of carrying out joint planning and carrying out operations, giving the JOC at the JFHQ a single point of command and control.

== Structure ==
The JFHQ is currently structured as follows:

- Joint Force Commander (JFC)
- Deputy Joint Force Commander (DJFC)
  - Chief of Staff (COS)
    - J1 Personnel
    - J2 Intelligence
    - J3 Operation
    - J4 Logistic
    - J5 Planning
    - J6 Communications
    - J7 Training
    - J8 Finance
    - J9 Legal
  - Head Joint Doctrine & Warfare Centre (Head JDWC)
    - Joint Doctrine
    - Joint Warfare

== Training exercises ==
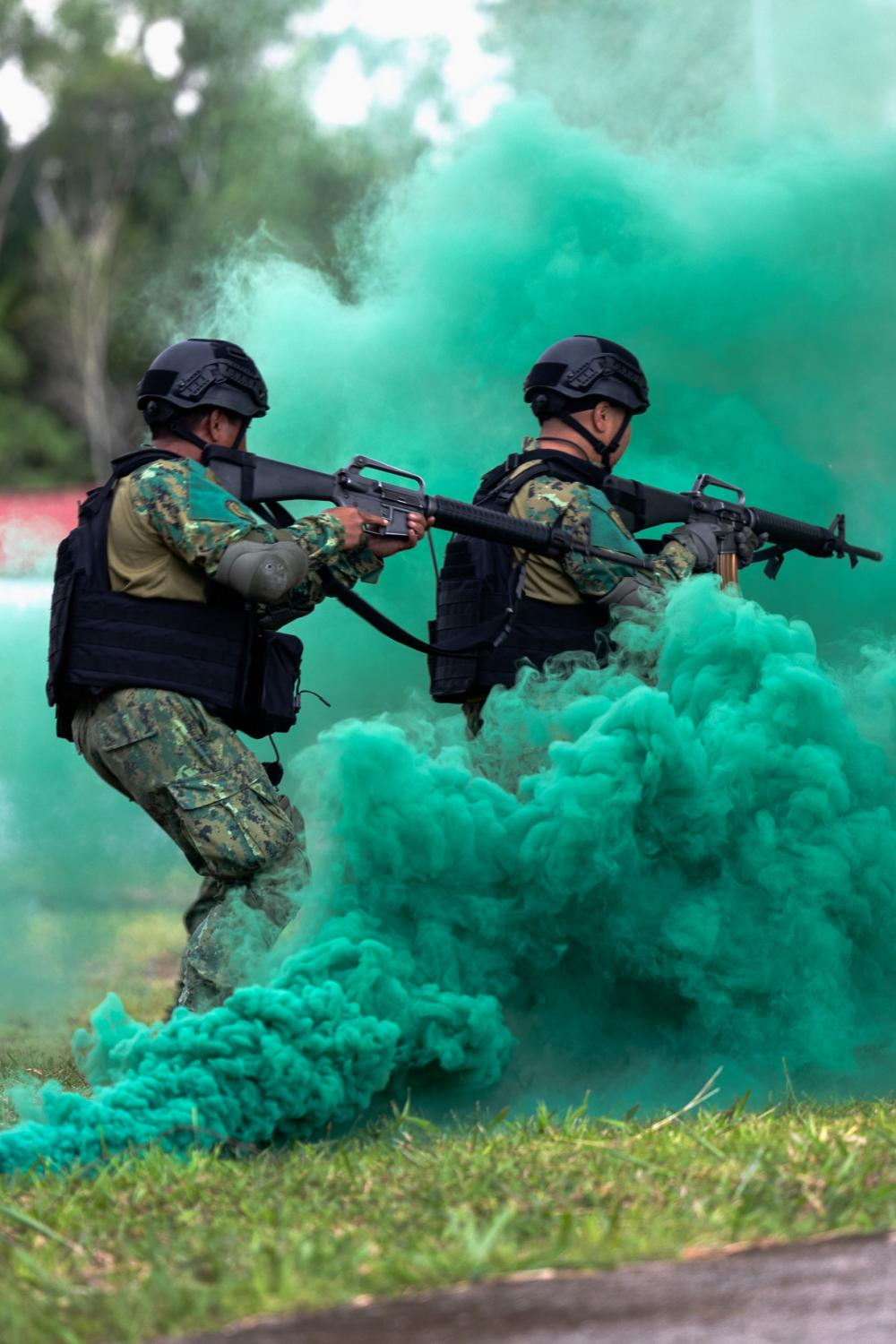
Soldiers of the Second Battalion RBLF taking part in CARAT Brunei 2022.

The Royal Brunei Armed Forces is still conducting cooperative drills with friendly countries' armed forces, including those of Australia, Singapore, Malaysia, the United Kingdom, the United States, and others. Exercises 'Maju Bersama', 'Flaming Arrow', 'Dragonball', 'Bold Castle', and 'Bold Sabre' are among the manoeuvres with the Singapore Armed Forces that these exercises involve for the Royal Brunei Land Force (RBLF / TDDB). Meanwhile, the Royal Brunei Navy (RBN / TLDB) and their Republic of Singapore Navy counterparts regularly conduct Exercise 'Pelican', and the air forces regularly conduct Exercise 'Airguard'.

An identical relationship exists between the Malaysian Armed Forces and the drills known as 'Brumal Setia', 'Malbru', 'Mertak Bersatu', and 'Hornbill'. Under the auspices of the US Pacific Command-funded Global Peacekeeping Operations Initiative, the Royal Brunei Armed Forces and its Indonesian counterparts participate in a relatively new training exercise known as 'Garuda Shield'. It takes place in the Infantry Education Centre in Cipatat, Bandung, and lasts for two weeks. More training exercises are also carried out with the British Armed Forces in 'Setia Kawan', New Zealand in 'Azam Bersama', Australia's 'Mallee Bull', and the United States military's annual Cooperation Afloat Readiness and Training (CARAT) manoeuvres.

=== Hikmat Bersatu ===
Every two years, the Royal Brunei Armed Forces conducts its largest countrywide exercise, known as Exercise Hikmat Bersatu. All RBAF services, including JFHQ, Royal Brunei Land Force (RBLF / TDDB), Royal Brunei Navy (RBN / TLDB), Royal Brunei Air Force (RBAirF / TUDB), the Special Forces Regiment, the Royal Brunei Malay Reserve Regiment, and the British Armed Forces Second Battalion of the Royal Gurkha Rifles, participated in Exercise Hikmat Bersatu.

=== CARAT Brunei ===
According to Brunei's Ministry of Defence, the whole range of activities during the 2018 Cooperation Afloat Readiness and Training (CARAT) exercise included symposiums on law and medicine, improvised explosive device (IED) identification and awareness, company attack and area clearance in the forest, and marine evolutions. The three services, the police force, the military medical services, the marine port authority, and the fisheries department are among the organisations that are involved.

The sea phase will include a variety of exercises, such as division tactics, which aims to improve communication as ships sail together in complex manoeuvres, anti-air warfare to hone missile defence skills, and tracking exercise, which aims to increase both navies' capacity to jointly track and pursue targets through the coordinated deployment of surface ships and maritime patrol aircraft. 2018 CARAT Brunei included both sides' ships and aircraft.

== Operations ==
United Nations-led International Monitoring Teams (IMT) in Mindanao, Philippines, have included Brunei Darussalam as a crucial component, providing its service personnel with invaluable experience and hands-on training in military operations other than conflict, especially in multinational operations, winning over people's support, and civil-military collaboration. The inclusion of Brunei Darussalam in the IMT has had positive results, and its presence will remain necessary. Additionally, Brunei Darussalam has sent troops to United Nations Transitional Authority in Cambodia (UNTAC), and to Lebanon under the United Nations Interim Force in Lebanon (UNIFIL). The UNTAC was tasked with holding free and fair elections as well as restoring civil governance and peace.

== List of Joint Force Commanders ==
Officers selected to head the JFHQ at Bolkiah Garrison are:

No.	portrait	rank name (born–died)	term of office			service branch	ref.
No.	portrait	rank name (born–died)	took office	left office	time in office	service branch	ref.
1		Colonel; Rosli Chuchu	14 Dec 2007	23 Nov 2009	1 year, 344 days	Royal Brunei Land Force	
2		First admiral Abdul Aziz (born 1966)	23 Nov 2009	19 Dec 2014	5 years, 26 days	Royal Brunei Navy	
3		Major general Hamzah Sahat	19 Dec 2014	19 Apr 2019	4 years, 121 days	Royal Brunei Air Force	
4		Brigadier general Mohammad Sharif	19 Apr 2019	28 Aug 2020	1 year, 131 days	Royal Brunei Air Force	
5		Brigadier general Abdul Razak (born 1972)	28 Aug 2020	25 Feb 2022	1 year, 181 days	Royal Brunei Land Force	
6		Brigadier general Alirupendi (born 1973)	25 Feb 2022	26 Sep 2023	1 year, 213 days	Royal Brunei Air Force	
7		Colonel; Hismawadi Said (Acting)	26 Sep 2023		3 years, 34 days		
