= Order of Pahlawan Negara Brunei =

Order of Brunei

Awarded by the Sultan of Brunei
- Type: Military decoration
- Established: 1959
- Country: Brunei
- Awarded for: For displaying particularly valiant behaviour
- Status: Currently constituted
- Sovereign: Hassanal Bolkiah
- Grades: Grand Commander (PSPNB); Commander (DHPNB); Companion (PNB); Officer (PJP)

Precedence
- Next (higher): Order of Paduka Keberanian Laila Terbilang
- Next (lower): Order of Setia Negara Brunei
- (PSPNB) (DHPNB) (PNB) (PJP)

The Most Gallant Order of Pahlawan Negara Brunei (Malay: Darjah Pahlawan Negara Brunei Yang Amat Perkasa), also translated as The Most Gallant Order of the Hero of the State of Brunei, is an order of Brunei. It was established on 28 November 1959 by Sultan Omar Ali Saifuddien III.

== Current classes ==
The four classes of appointment to the Order are, from highest grade to lowest grade:

Class	Post-nominal	Title	Ribbon bar
Grand Commander	PSPNB	Dato Seri Pahlawan	
Commander	DHPNB	Dato Hamzah Pahlawan	
Companion	PNB	–	
Officer	PJP	–	

== Description ==
In the numerous links of the collar, crossed daggers, swords, tridents, and arrows are created in a military-appropriate fashion. Red, green, and white enamel is used to embellish each of these emblems. The first class's items included a collar chain that measured about 920 millimetres (36 in) and had 16 medallions on it, including two crossed sabres, two crossed tridents, and two crossed lances. There were also eight smaller medallions of crossed daggers with different designs made of silver, gilt, and enamel; an adornment or sash badge measuring 65 millimetres (2.6 in) and a star measuring 88 millimetres (3.5 in) that was made of silver, gilt, and enamel, with a sash riband.

== Recipients ==
Members of the armed forces who have displayed particularly valiant behavior are given this order.

=== First Class ===
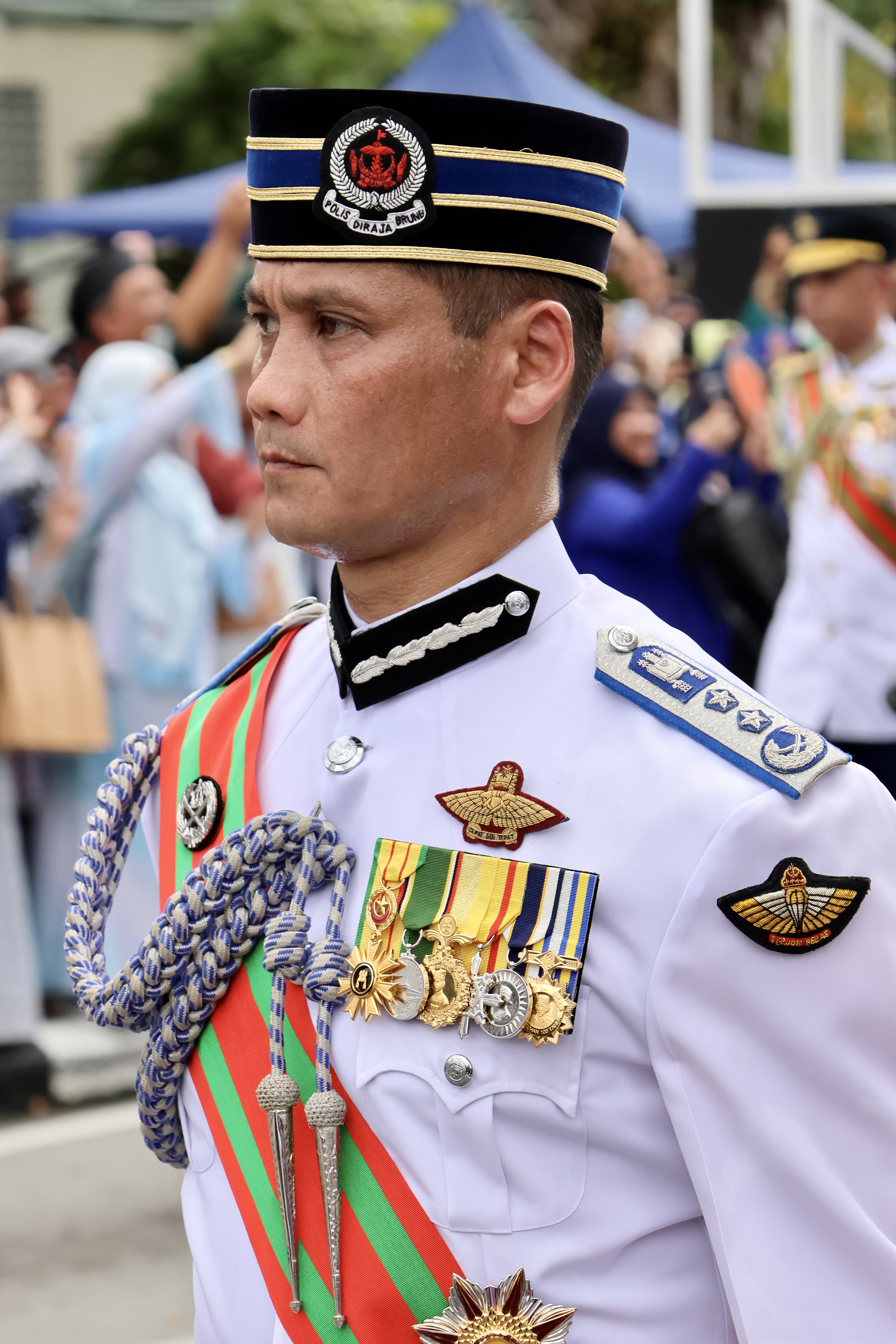
Deputy Police Commissioner Sulaiman wearing his sash in 2024

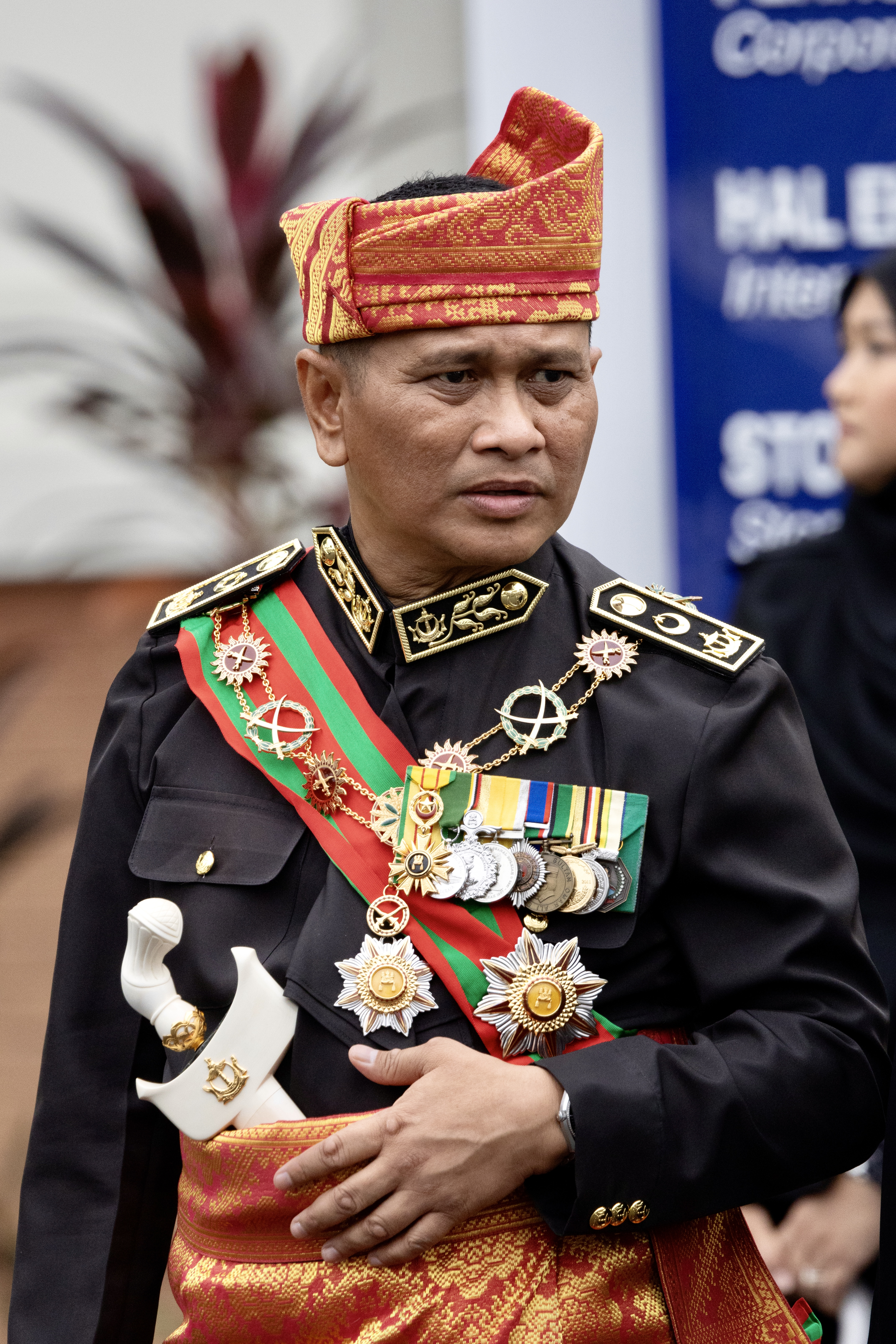
Alirupendi wearing his sash in 2024

- Unknown – Field Marshal Hassanal Bolkiah – Sultan of Brunei
- Unknown – General Omar Ali Saifuddien III – Sultan of Brunei
- Unknown – Major General Husin – Commander of the Royal Brunei Armed Forces
- Unknown – Major General Ibnu – Deputy Minister of Defence
- Unknown – Colonel Kefli – Commander of the Royal Brunei Navy
- Unknown – George Edwin Coster – Assistant Commissioner in the Special Branch
- 1971 – Lieutenant Colonel John Simpson – Commander of the Royal Brunei Malay Regiment
- 1971 – James Richard Henry Burns – Commissioner of Police
- 1976 – Pengiran Umar – Commissioner of Police
- 1976 – Lieutenant Colonel Pengiran Ibnu Basit – Formation of RBLF Second Battalion
- 1976 – Lieutenant Colonel Mohammad – Member of Legislative Council
- 2005 – Mohd Bakri Omar – Inspector-General of Police
- 2008 – Police-General Sutanto – Chief of the Indonesian National Police
- 2008 – Musa Hassan – Inspector-General of Police
- 2011 – First Admiral Abdul Aziz – Commander of Joint Force Headquarters
- 2011 – First Admiral Abdul Halim – Commander of the Royal Brunei Navy
- 2011 – Brigadier General Yusof – Commander of the Royal Brunei Land Forces
- 2011 – Brigadier General Jofri – Commander of the Royal Brunei Air Force
- 2011 – Major General Tawih – Commander of the Royal Brunei Armed Forces
- 2012 – Bahrin Mohd Noor – Deputy Commissioner of Police
- 2014 – Brigadier General Wardi – Commander of the Royal Brunei Air Force
- 2015 – Major General Pengiran Aminan – Commander of the Royal Brunei Armed Forces
- 2015 – Major General Hamzah – Commander of the Royal Brunei Armed Forces
- 2015 – First Admiral Pengiran Norazmi – Commander of the Royal Brunei Navy
- 2015 – Jammy Shah Al-Islam – Commissioner of Police
- 2016 – Brigadier General Shahril Anwar – Commander of the Royal Brunei Air Force
- 2018 – Irwan Hambali – Commissioner of Police
- 2018 – Brigadier General Khairul – Commander of the Royal Brunei Land Forces
- 2019 – Brigadier General Sharif – Commander of the Royal Brunei Air Force
- 2019 – First Admiral Othman – Commander of the Royal Brunei Navy
- 2021 – Major General Haszaimi – Commander of the Royal Brunei Armed Forces
- 2021 – First Admiral Spry – Commander of the Royal Brunei Navy
- 2021 – Brigadier General Abdul Razak – Deputy Minister of Defence
- 2022 – Brigadier General Saifulrizal – Commander of the Royal Brunei Land Forces
- 2022 – Sulaiman Alidin – Deputy Commissioner of Police
- 2022 – Brigadier General Alirupendi – Joint Force Commander

=== Second Class ===
- 1963 – Pengiran Jaya – Commissioner of Police

=== Third Class ===
- Unknown – Pengiran Mohammed Abdul Rahman Piut – Member of Privy Council
- 1963 – Pengiran Mokhtar Puteh – Member of Privy Council
- 1963 – Ali Ghani – killed during Brunei revolt in 1962 (posthumous)

=== Fourth Class ===
- 1963 – Mohamed Tahir – killed during Brunei revolt in 1962 (posthumous)
- 1963 – Selasa Othman – killed during Brunei revolt in 1962 (posthumous)
