= Abdul Aziz Mohd Tamit =

9th Commander of the Royal Brunei Navy, 4th Deputy Minister of Defence (born 1966)

First Admiral (Retired) Dato Seri Pahlawan Abdul Aziz Mohd Tamit PSPNB SMB
- عبدالعزيز محمد تاميت
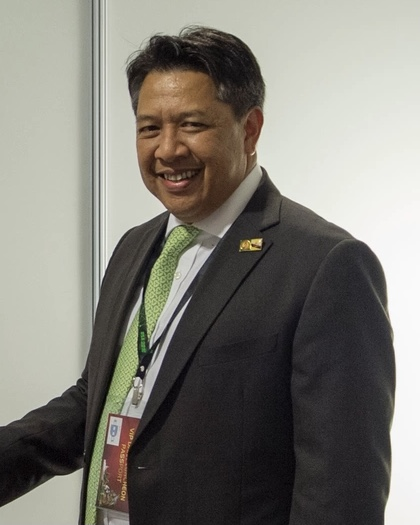
- Deputy Minister Abdul Aziz in 2016

4th Deputy Minister of Defence
- In office 22 October 2015 – 30 January 2018
- Monarch: Hassanal Bolkiah
- Minister: Hassanal Bolkiah; Halbi Mohammad Yussof
- Preceded by: Mustappa Sirat
- Succeeded by: Office abolished

9th Commander of the Royal Brunei Navy
- In office 28 February 2014 – 13 March 2015
- Deputy: Pengiran Norazmi; Othman Suhaili
- Preceded by: Abdul Halim
- Succeeded by: Pengiran Norazmi

Personal details
- Born: 23 September 1966 (age 60) Brunei
- Education: Universiti Brunei Darussalam; University of Oxford; Harvard Kennedy School
- Profession: Military officer; politician

Military service
- Allegiance: Brunei
- Branch/service: Royal Brunei Navy
- Years of service: 1984–2015
- Rank: First Admiral
- Unit: KDB Perwira; KDB Pejuang; KDB Waspada
- Commands: Royal Brunei Navy; Joint Force Commander

Abdul Aziz bin Haji Mohd Tamit (born 23 September 1966) is a retired Bruneian military officer and politician. He previously served as the ninth Commander of the Royal Brunei Navy (RBN) from 2014 to 2015. He was also the Deputy Minister of Defence from 2015 to 2018.

== Military career ==
In January 1984, Abdul Aziz enlisted into the Royal Brunei Armed Forces (RBAF). Following his initial officer training at the Britannia Royal Naval College at Dartmouth in the United Kingdom, he graduated as a midshipman in 1985, and selected the Royal Brunei Navy (RBN) as his operational service branch. Abdul Aziz was promoted to the rank of lieutenant junior grade in 1986, and later lieutenant in 1990. He was further promoted to lieutenant commander and commander, in 1994 and 2002 respectively.

During his service with the RBN, Commander Abdul Aziz held several positions; including gunnery officer, navigation officer, and executive officer of several ships; KDB Perwira, KDB Pejuang, and KDB Waspada.

Several other notable positions held by Abdul Aziz include the RBN's Fleet Commander twice from 9 March 2003 to 22 December 2005, and 29 June 2006 to 1 April 2007. Upon his promotion to the rank of captain in 2006, he was appointed as; the SO3 Doctrine and Staff Duties in Directorate of Training, the Head of Naval Project in Directorate of Operations in 2007, the Head of Special Project in Deputy Minister of Defence Secretariat, the Director of Force Capability Development and Director of Operations on 14 November 2007.

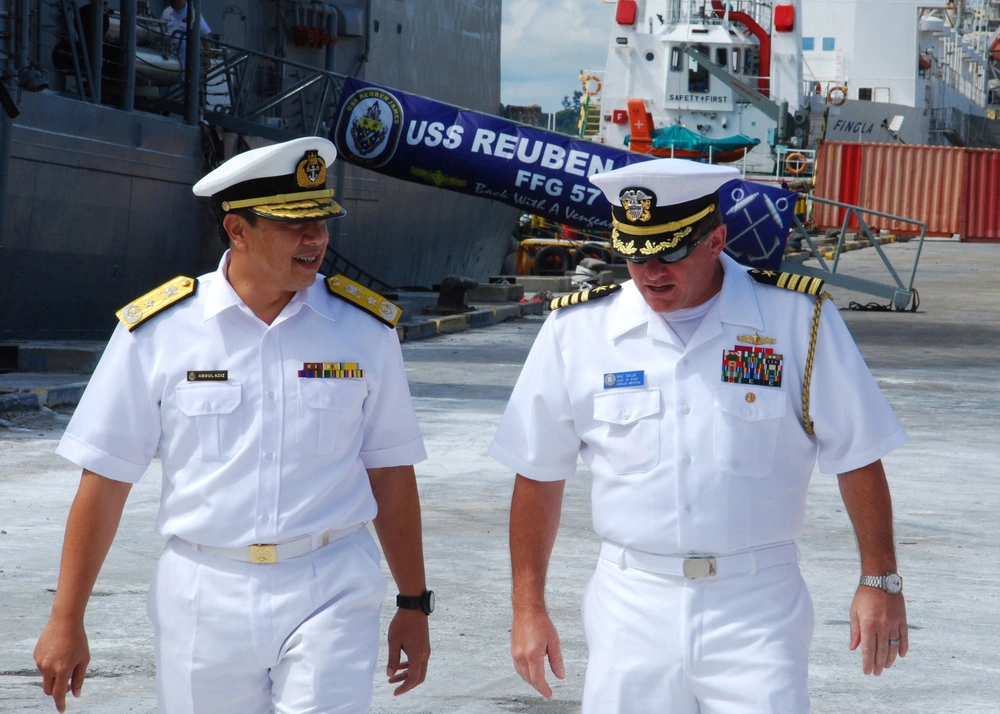
First Admiral Abdul Aziz during CARAT 2012.

Before being finally promoted to First Admiral in 2011, Captain Abdul Aziz was the RBAF's Joint Force Commander on 23 November 2009. Later appointed as the ninth Commander of RBN on 28 February 2014. Not long after his appointment, the RBN would reach another milestone by joining the Multilateral Maritime Exercise (MMEx) and International Fleet Review (IFR) for the first time.The exercise, hosted by the People's Liberation Army Navy, would be joined by KDB Darulehsan (07) in Qingdao, China from 20 to 24 April 2014. Later that year on 9 September, him alongside Commander Mohammad Tawih and Sultan Hassanal Bolkiah attended the commissioning ceremony of the newly acquired KDB Daruttaqwa (09) at the Muara Naval Base.

Another Navy milestone was achieved during RIMPAC's SINKEX on 18 July 2014, when KDB Darussalam (06) and KDB Darulaman (08) successfully launched their Exocet MM40 missiles. On 13 March 2015, the handover ceremony of the command of the Royal Brunei Navy was held between Abdul Aziz and Norazmi Muhammad.

=== Military education ===
Throughout his career, Abdul Aziz attended several institutes and training overseas: the Britannia Royal Naval College at Dartmouth in the United Kingdom in 1985; the International Sub Lieutenant, International Communication and Electronic Warfare, International Principal Warfare Officer Courses in United Kingdom; the Naval Junior Staff Course in Australia; the Naval Staff Course at Naval War College, Newport, United States in 1999; the National Security Staff Course at Canadian Forces College, Toronto, Canada in 2006; the Executive Development Programme at Universiti Brunei Darussalam in 2002; the Negotiation Programme at Said Business School, University of Oxford, England in 2007; and the Senior Executives in National and International Security at Harvard Kennedy School, Cambridge, United States in 2013.

== Political career ==
During a cabinet reshuffle on. 22 October 2015, Abdul Aziz was appointed as the Deputy Minister at the Ministry of Defence. To improve understandings on naval aviation and carrier strike group operations, Ambassador Craig B. Allen and Deputy Minister Abdul Aziz visited the USS John C. Stennis (CVN-74), hosted by Rear Admiral Marcus A. Hitchcock on 18 May 2016. On 16 November 2017, he became the guest of honour during the decommissioning ceremony of his previous ship, KDB Perwira. After a cabinet reshuffle on 30 January 2018, Halbi bin Mohammad Yussof would replace him as the new Second Minister of Defence after the 2018 cabinet reshuffle, hence the deputy minister of defence's office was abolished.

== Personal life ==
Abdul Aziz is married to Sakdiah binti Haji Mohd Noor, they have three children together. In his spare time, he is a keen golfer and enjoys reading.

== Honours ==
=== National ===
- Order of Pahlawan Negara Brunei First Class (PSPNB; 16 July 2011) – Dato Seri Pahlawan
- Order of Seri Paduka Mahkota Brunei Third Class (SMB; 15 July 2006)
- Long Service Medal and Good Conduct (PKLPB)
- Sultan of Brunei Silver Jubilee Medal (5 October 1992)
- General Service Medal (Armed Forces)
- Royal Brunei Armed Forces Silver Jubilee Medal (31 May 1986)
- Royal Brunei Armed Forces Golden Jubilee Medal (31 May 2011)

=== Foreign ===
- Singapore:
  - Pingat Jasa Gemilang (Tentera) (PSG; 11 June 2015)

Military offices
Preceded by Abdul Halim	9th Commander of the Royal Brunei Navy; 28 February 2014 – 13 March 2015	Succeeded by Pengiran Norazmi
Preceded by Rosli Chuchu	Joint Force Commander of the Royal Brunei Armed Forces; 23 November 2009 – 19 December 2014	Succeeded by Hamzah Sahat
Political offices
Preceded by Mustappa Sirat	4th Deputy Minister of Defence; 22 October 2015 – 30 January 2018	Succeeded by office abolished
