= Abdul Halim Hanifah =

Bruneian naval officer (born 1965)

First Admiral (Retired) Dato Seri Pahlawan Abdul Halim Hanifah PSPNB SMB
- عبدالحاليم حنيفه
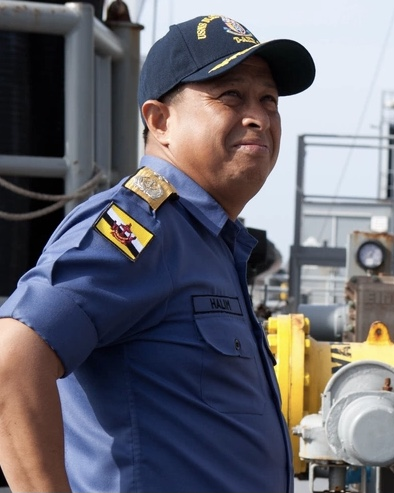
- First admiral Abdul Halim in 2013

8th Commander of the Royal Brunei Navy
- In office 16 May 2008 – 28 February 2014
- Monarch: Hassanal Bolkiah
- Deputy: Aznan Julaihi; Pengiran Norazmi
- Preceded by: Joharie Matussin
- Succeeded by: Abdul Aziz

Personal details
- Born: 24 January 1965 (age 61) Brunei
- Spouse: Umiyati Noor
- Relations: Hisham (brother); Mohamad Azmi (brother); Wafi Aminuddin (nephew); Afi Aminuddin (nephew)
- Children: 5
- Profession: Military officer

Military service
- Allegiance: Brunei
- Branch/service: Royal Brunei Navy
- Years of service: 1983–2014
- Rank: First Admiral
- Unit: KDB Pejuang (P-03); KDB Seteria (P-04)
- Commands: Royal Brunei Navy; Naval Training

Abdul Halim bin Haji Mohd Hanifah (born 24 January 1965) is a retired Bruneian military officer who served as the 8th commander of the Royal Brunei Navy (RBN) from 2008 to 2013.

== Early life and education ==
Abdul Halim was born on 24 January 1965. Throughout his career, he attended several institutes and training overseas including the International Cadet Fund Accounting Services, Maritime Surveillance, International Long Navigation, Advance Military Command and Staff Course, completed Britannia Royal Naval College, Devon, United Kingdom in 1985, obtained Master of Arts (MA) and Master of Science (MS) in Defence Studies and Strategic Studies.

== Military career ==
On 24 July 1982, he enlisted into the RBAF and commissioned as an officer cadet in 1983. Abdul Halim advanced in rank starting from Sub-lieutenant in 1985, Junior Lieutenant in 1987, Lieutenant in 1990, Lieutenant Commander in 1994, Commander in 2004, Captain in 2007. The Commander-in-chief, Sultan Hassanal Bolkiah appointed him as the 8th commander of the Royal Brunei Navy in 2008. The handover ceremony from his predecessor, Joharie Matussin, was held at Muara Naval Base, Muara on 16 May 2008. Prior to the commencing of the annual naval bilateral exercise, Exercise Pelican 2010, the opening ceremony was held at Changi Naval Base and Abdul Halim commented on the relationship between Singapore and Brunei,

The warm and friendly defence relations between the two navies reaffirm the commitment of both nations towards strengthening defence cooperation for peace and stability in the region. We highly value the long-standing and excellent cooperation between the two navies, and look forward to maintaining and expanding traditions of trusted and mutually advantageous cooperation between the Republic of Singapore and Brunei Darussalam.

— Abdul Halim Mohd Hanifah, MINDEF Singapore, 21 June 2010

Commander Abdul Halim received a call from Rear Admiral Orwen J. Cortez, Philippines Ambassador Nestor Z. Ochoa, Commander Leofilo G. Pulmano to commence the bilateral naval exercise between Brunei and Philippines, named Maritime Training Activity (MTA) SEAGULL 05/12, which would last from 19 to 25 November 2012 and involved four ships; KDB Syafaat (19) and KDB Afiat (20), BRP Artemio Ricarte (PS-37) and BRP Mariano Alvarez (PS-38). Brunei hosted the Association of Southeast Asian Nations Humanitarian Assistance/Disaster Relief and Military Medicine Exercise which lasted from 17 to 20 June 2013, he welcomed the crew and captain of the recently arrived USNS Matthew Perry (T-AKE-9) at Muara Port on 18 June. During BRIDEX 2013, he signed a Memorandum of Understanding (MoU) with the Commander of the Vietnam People's Navy, Admiral Nguyễn Văn Hiến.

== Personal life ==
Abdul Halim is married to Umiyati binti Mohammad Noor and they have five children together. In addition, he enjoys playing association football and golf. His brothers, Hisham and Azmi are also high-ranking government officials. His nephews Afi Aminuddin and Wafi Aminuddin are Brunei international footballers.

== Honours ==
=== National ===
- Order of Pahlawan Negara Brunei First Class (PSPNB; 15 July 2011) – Dato Seri Pahlawan
- Order of Seri Paduka Mahkota Brunei Third Class (SMB)
- Long Service Medal and Good Conduct (PKLPB)
- Sultan of Brunei Golden Jubilee Medal (5 October 2017)
- Sultan of Brunei Silver Jubilee Medal (5 October 1992)
- General Service Medal (Armed Forces)
- Royal Brunei Armed Forces Silver Jubilee Medal (31 May 1986)
- Royal Brunei Armed Forces Golden Jubilee Medal (31 May 2011)

=== Foreign ===
- Singapore:
  - Pingat Jasa Gemilang (Tentera) (PJG; 27 January 2011)
- Pakistan:
  - Hilal-i-Imtiaz (18 October 2012)
- Indonesia:
  - Bintang Jalasena Utama (11 March 2013)

Military offices
Preceded by Joharie Matussin	8th Commander of the Royal Brunei Navy; 16 May 2008 – 28 February 2014	Succeeded by Abdul Aziz
