= Alirupendi =

Bruneian military officer (born 1973)

Brigadier General (Retired) Dato Seri Pahlawan Alirupendi PSPNB PSB PIKB
- اليروڤندي
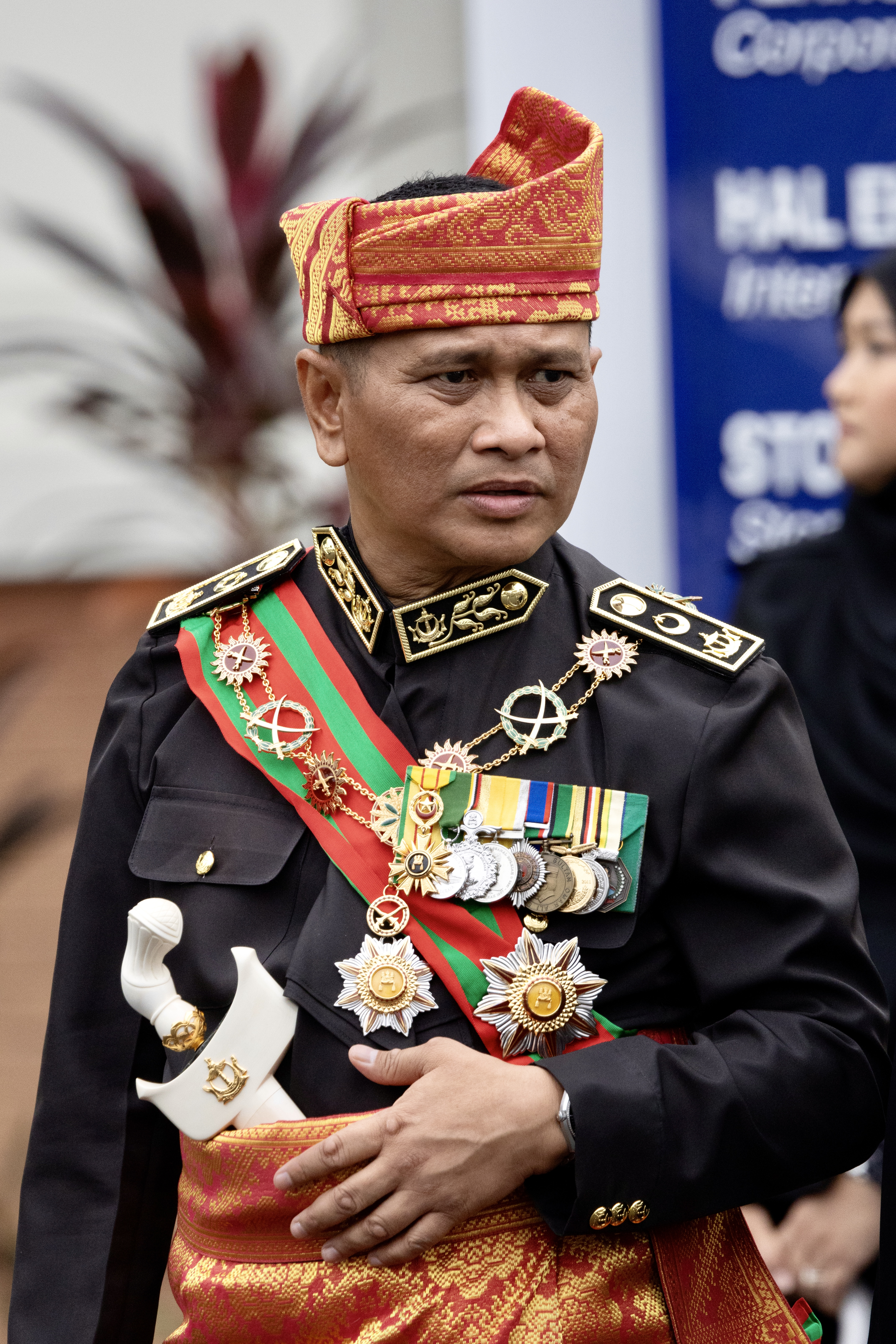
- Alirupendi in 2024
- Born: Alirupendi bin Haji Perudin; June 1973 (age 53)
- Education: University of Madras; National University of Malaysia
- Military career
- Allegiance: Brunei
- Branch: Royal Brunei Air Force
- Service years: 1992–2022
- Rank: Brigadier General
- Service number: 412
- Units: aide-de-camp to the Commander of the Royal Brunei Armed Forces defence attaché of Brunei to the Philippines
- Commands: Base Defence Squadron; Air Regiment Training; No. 33 Squadron; Deputy Commander of the RBAirF; Joint Force Commander

Alirupendi bin Haji Perudin (born June 1973) is a Bruneian civil servant and retired military officer who served as the Permanent Secretary, Ministry of Defence (MINDEF) since 2023. He was formerly the Deputy Commander of the Royal Brunei Air Force (RBAirF) from 2020 to 2022.

== Military career ==
In September 1992, Alirupendi enlisted in the Royal Brunei Armed Forces (RBAF). After earning his degree from the Royal Air Force College Cranwell, United Kingdom, in 1994, he started his professional growth. After that, he participated in a number of domestic and international professional development courses in the UK, Malaysia, Singapore, and India. He received a psc from Defence Services Staff College in India in 2008, then in 2016 he graduated from the Malaysian Armed Forces Defence College. His master's degrees in defence and strategic studies from the University of Madras, India, and defence studies from the National University of Malaysia were awarded to him.

Alirupendi had a number of positions throughout his time in the military, including second-in-command of the Air Regiment, officer commanding (OC) of the Base Defence Squadron, Air Regiment Training Officer, No. 33 Squadron, and Air Regiment. He held positions as the Commander of the Royal Brunei Armed Forces' (RBAF) aide-de-camp, Brunei's defence attaché to the Philippines, the Commander of the RBAF' military assistant, and Staff Officer Grade 1 Personnel Director of Personnel at the MINDEF. From 24 December 2020 to 24 February 2022, he held the position of Deputy Commander of the RBAirF. At Dewan Punai, Rimba Air Force Base, on 24 December 2020, the RBAirF hosted the handover ceremony between Colonel Alirupendi, the newly appointed Deputy Commander, and Abdul Rahman Durahman, the departing Deputy Commander.

On 25 February 2022, Colonel Alirupendi was elevated to the rank of brigadier general with the approval of Sultan Hassanal Bolkiah. The emblem was given to him during an event in the Officers' Mess, Bolkiah Garrison, by Major General Hamzah Sahat, the Commander of the RBAF. He was also appointed as the Joint Force Commander of the RBAF on the same day. On 2 May, Ikmal Hisham Abdul Aziz and Brigadier General Alirupendi paid a two-day working visit to Malaysia Battalion (MALBATT) 850–9 at UNP 2-1 Marakah Camp, South Lebanon.

With an emphasis on strengthening bilateral relations, Brunei's Lieutenant Colonel Aldi Hassan and Brigadier General Alirupendi co-chaired the opening and closing ceremonies of the Indo Pacific Endeavour 2022 (IPE 02/2022), Australia's annual defence-led engagement that aimed to strengthen partnerships in the Indo-Pacific. After a 13-month deployment with UNIFIL, thirty RBAF personnel from MALBATT 850-9 were welcomed back to Brunei by Alirupendi at a ceremony on 13 December 2022.

Alirupendi and his spouse were honoured with a Regimental Dinner by the RBAirF on 21 October 2023, at the Officers' Mess, Berakas Garrison. Brigadier General Mohammad Sharif Ibrahim was the guest of honour. During his speech, Mohammad Sharif urged the next generation of leaders to look up to Alirupendi. He highlighted the latter's noteworthy contributions to the RBAF, such as his establishment of the Disciplinary Review Authority (DRA), improvement of the RBAF Welfare Fund, and efficient use of the Tabung Surau.

== Later career ==
On 26 September 2023, Alirupendi was named Permanent Secretary at the MINDEF at the orders of Sultan Hassanal Bolkiah. Later on 25 October, Secretary of Defence, Hamood Uz Zaman Khan, and Alirupendi sign the Memorandum of Understanding (MoU).

On 7 December 2023, Lieutenant General Stephen Sklenka welcomed Alirupendi to USINDOPACOM headquarters for the 16th Joint Defence Working Committee meeting and the Section 505 Agreement signing. The objectives of this collaborative partnership are to reinforce USINDOPACOM's dedication to advancing an open, free, and prosperous Indo-Pacific region, formalise the exchange of diplomatic notes and assets, and improve collaboration and integration between the two nations.

Following a delegation of senior officials from MINDEF's visit to the Department of National Defense (DND) headquarters at Camp Aguinaldo on 19 June 2024, the Philippines reiterated its dedication to fortifying bilateral defence relationships with Brunei. Brunei's delegation, led by Alirupendi, was in Manila from 18 to 20 June in order to hold the 9th Joint Defense Working Committee (JDWC) Meeting involving Manila and Bandar Seri Begawan.

The Sultan Haji Hassanal Bolkiah Institute of Defence and Strategic Studies (SHHBIDSS) in Bolkiah Garrison hosted the 19th Executive Development Programme (EDP) for Senior Government Officers on Public Policy and Management on 10 July 2024, with an opening ceremony hosted by the MINDEF. Alirupendi stressed the program's emphasis on modern policies, which gives learners a thorough grasp of public policy in a dynamic setting. He mentioned how different people participated and worked together with the Lee Kuan Yew School of Public Policy faculty, which improved policy insights.

== Personal life ==
Alirupendi was born in June 1973, and he has five children from his marriage to Datin Hajah Azizah binti Haji Miramit. He enjoys reading, playing soccer and golf.

== Honours ==
Alirupendi has earned the following honours:

- Order of Pahlawan Negara Brunei First Class (PSPNB; 15 July 2022) – Dato Seri Pahlawan
- Order of Setia Negara Brunei Fourth Class (PSB; 2016)
- Excellent Service Medal (PIKB)
- Sultan of Brunei Golden Jubilee Medal (5 October 2017)
- Sultan of Brunei Silver Jubilee Medal (5 October 1992)
- General Service Medal (Armed Forces)
- Long Service Medal and Good Conduct (PKLPB)
- Royal Brunei Armed Forces Golden Jubilee Medal (31 May 2011)
- Royal Brunei Armed Forces Diamond Jubilee Medal (31 May 2021)

Military offices
Preceded by Abdul Razak	Joint Force Commander of the Royal Brunei Armed Forces; 25 February 2022 – 26 September 2023	Succeeded by Mohammad Zouhdy
Preceded by Abdul Rahman Durahman	Deputy Commander of the Royal Brunei Air Force; 24 December 2020 – 24 February 2022	Succeeded by Haszahaidi Ahmad Daud
