= Hamzah Sahat =

Commander of the Royal Brunei Armed Forces and the Royal Brunei Air Force

Major General (Retired) Dato Seri Pahlawan Hamzah Sahat PSPNB SMB PIKB
- حمزه سهات
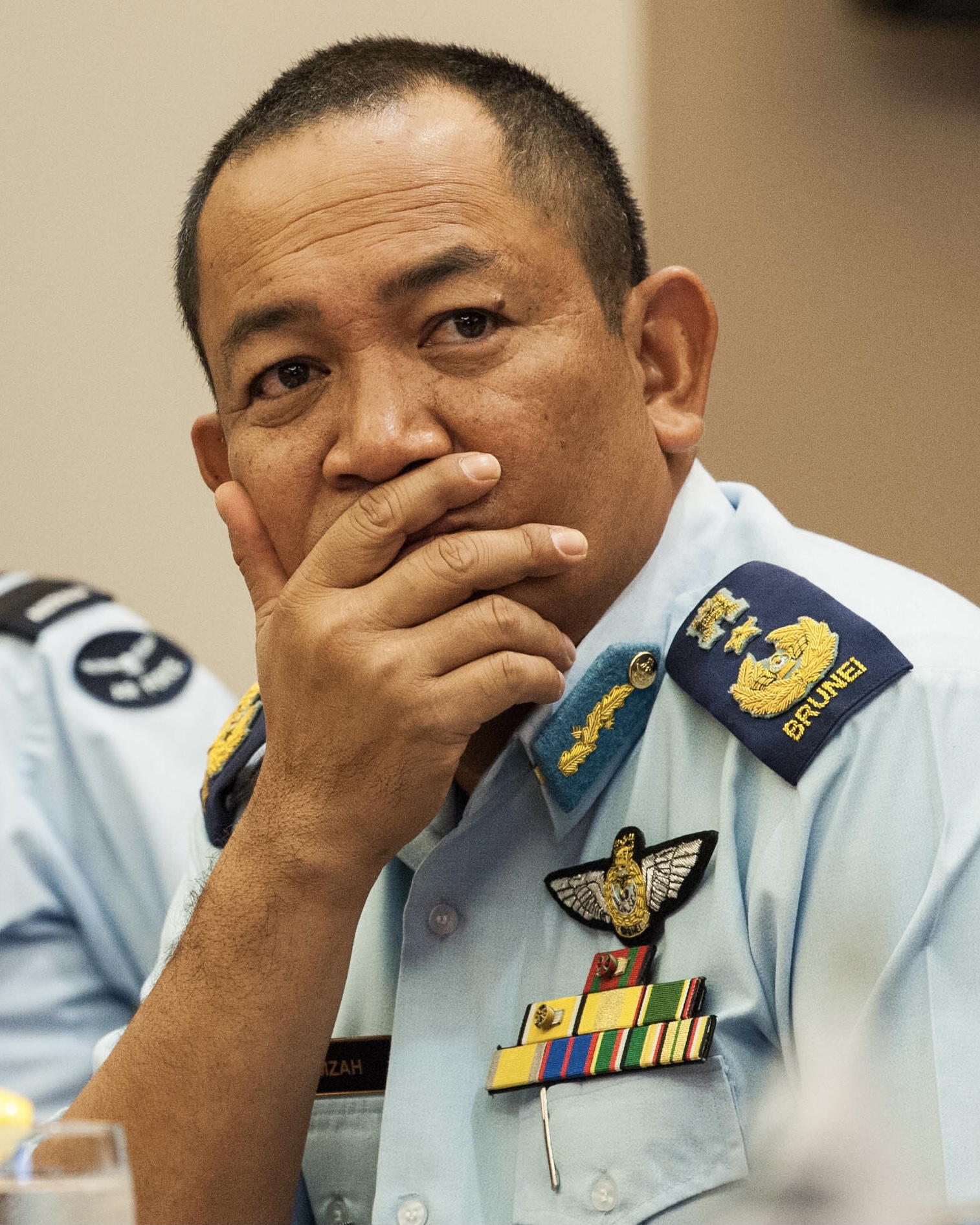
- Brigadier general Hamzah in 2022

11th Commander of the Royal Brunei Armed Forces
- In office 1 September 2020 – 1 March 2022
- Monarch: Hassanal Bolkiah
- Preceded by: Pengiran Aminan
- Succeeded by: Haszaimi Bol Hassan

7th Commander of the Royal Brunei Air Force
- In office 18 August 2018 – 28 August 2020
- Deputy: Abdul Rahman Durahman; Alirupendi
- Preceded by: Shahril Anwar
- Succeeded by: Mohammad Sharif

Personal details
- Born: Brunei
- Spouse: Anita Binurul Zahrina
- Education: King's College London (MA); University of Madras (MPhil)
- Profession: Military officer; pilot; flight instructor

Military service
- Allegiance: Brunei
- Branch/service: Royal Brunei Air Force
- Years of service: 1988–2022
- Rank: Major General
- Unit: No. 2 Squadron (BO105); No. 5 Squadron (CN 235); Training Wing (PC-7 Mk.II)
- Commands: Flight Commander Fixed Wing; Flying Training School; Joint Force Commander; Operation Wing

Hamzah bin Haji Sahat is a retired Bruneian airman and the 11th Commander of the Royal Brunei Armed Forces (RBAF) who served in post from September 2020 until his retirement in March 2022. He previously held the position as the commander of the Royal Brunei Air Force (RBAirF) from 2018 to 2020.

== Education ==
Throughout his career, he was sent to several training institutes, which include the Initial Officer Training (IOT) and Basic Flying Training (BFT) at the Royal Air Force College Cranwell near Cranwell in Lincolnshire, England in 1989; the Advanced Flying Training (AFT) at RAF Valley, Isle of Anglesey, North Wales in 1990; Tactical Weapon Unit (TWU) at RAF Chivenor in Devon, England from 1990 to 1991; Qualified Flying Instructor (QFI) course at RAF Topcliffe and RAF Linton-on-Ouse in Yorkshire, England in 1997; 6th Advanced Command and Staff Course (ACSC) at Joint Services Command and Staff College in Oxfordshire, England; and graduated from King's College London with Master of Arts (MA) in 2002; attended National Defence College (NDC) at New Delhi in India; and graduated from University of Madras, the Master of Philosophy (MPhil) with First Class in Defence and Strategic Studies in 2010.

== Military career ==
On 12 September 1988, Hamzah enlisted in the Royal Brunei Armed Forces (RBAF) and subsequently graduated with the rank of second lieutenant on 27 July 1989. From 1992 to 1997, he flew Bolkow BO105 helicopters, before returning from the United Kingdom to be an instructor for the Pilatus PC-7 MkII trainer aircraft in 1997. Hamzah later held the positions of Flight Commander Fixed Wing (Flt Comd FW) and Officer Commanding (OC) at the Flying Training School (FTS) in 2000.

He became a Staff Officer Grade 2 (SO2) Operation after returning to Brunei from the UK in 2003. Later assigned as a Staff Officer Grade 1 (SO1) Operation to the RBAF's Directorate of Operation at the Ministry of Defence in 2005, he returned to RBAirF's Commanding Officer (CO) of Operation Wing in 2007. He held another important position as the Chief of Staff (COS) of Joint Force Headquarters (JFHQ) from 2010 to 2012, before being assigned to the role of Deputy Commander of the RBAirF. Hamzah was appointed as the Joint Force Commander of the RBAF on 19 December 2014.

On 17 August 2018, the role of Commander of the RBAirF was succeeded by him, and he held that position until 28 August 2020, his successor Brigadier General Mohammad Sharif would then take on his role. He attended the 15th ASEAN Air Chief Conference (AACC) hosted by the Republic of Singapore Air Force (RSAF) on 1 September of that same year, and also attended RSAF's 50th anniversary parade at Tengah Air Base. During his time in command, he saw the introduction of a new grey Digital Disruptive Pattern (D2P) design fabric for the RBAirF's uniform in 2019.

The handover ceremony between Hamzah and Mohammad Sharif was held at Royal Brunei Air Force Base, Rimba, in Bandar Seri Begawan on 28 August 2020. On 1 September 2020, Hamzah officially became the 11th Commander of the RBAF, and succeeded Aminan Mahmud. The handover ceremony was held on 1 March 2022; 4 years ago, between him and his successor, Muhammad Haszaimi.

== Personal life ==
Hamzah is married to Hajah Anita Binurul Zahrina, daughter of Pehin Dato Abdul Aziz, and together they have two children. When spare time allows, he enjoys reading, and playing volleyball and golf.

== Honours ==
=== Things named after him ===
- Hamzah Loop, road name within the Royal Brunei Air Force Base, Rimba, officiated on 22 April 2022.

=== National ===
- Order of Pahlawan Negara Brunei First Class (PSPNB; 15 August 2015) – Dato Seri Pahlawan
- Order of Seri Paduka Mahkota Brunei Third Class (SMB)
- Excellent Service Medal (PIKB)
- Sultan of Brunei Golden Jubilee Medal (5 October 2017)
- Sultan of Brunei Silver Jubilee Medal (5 October 1992)
- General Service Medal
- Long Service Medal and Good Conduct (PKLPB)
- Royal Brunei Armed Forces Golden Jubilee Medal (31 May 2011)

=== Foreign ===
- Singapore:
  - Pingat Jasa Gemilang (Tentera) (PJG; 8 December 2020)
  - Darjah Utama Bakti Cemerlang (Tentera) (DUBC; 12 July 2022)

Military offices
| Preceded by Pengiran Aminan | 11th Commander of the Royal Brunei Armed Forces; 1 September 2020 – 1 March 2022 | Succeeded by Haszaimi Bol Hassan |
| Preceded by Shahril Anwar | 7th Commander of the Royal Brunei Air Force; 18 August 2018 – 28 August 2020 | Succeeded by Mohammad Sharif |
| Preceded by Abdul Aziz | Joint Force Commander of the Royal Brunei Armed Forces; 19 December 2014 – 19 April 2019 | Succeeded by Mohammad Sharif |
