= Mohammad Sharif Ibrahim =

15th Commander of the Royal Brunei Air Force

Brigadier General Dato Seri Pahlawan Mohammad Sharif Ibrahim PSPNB SMB PSB PIKB
- محمد شريف إبراهيم
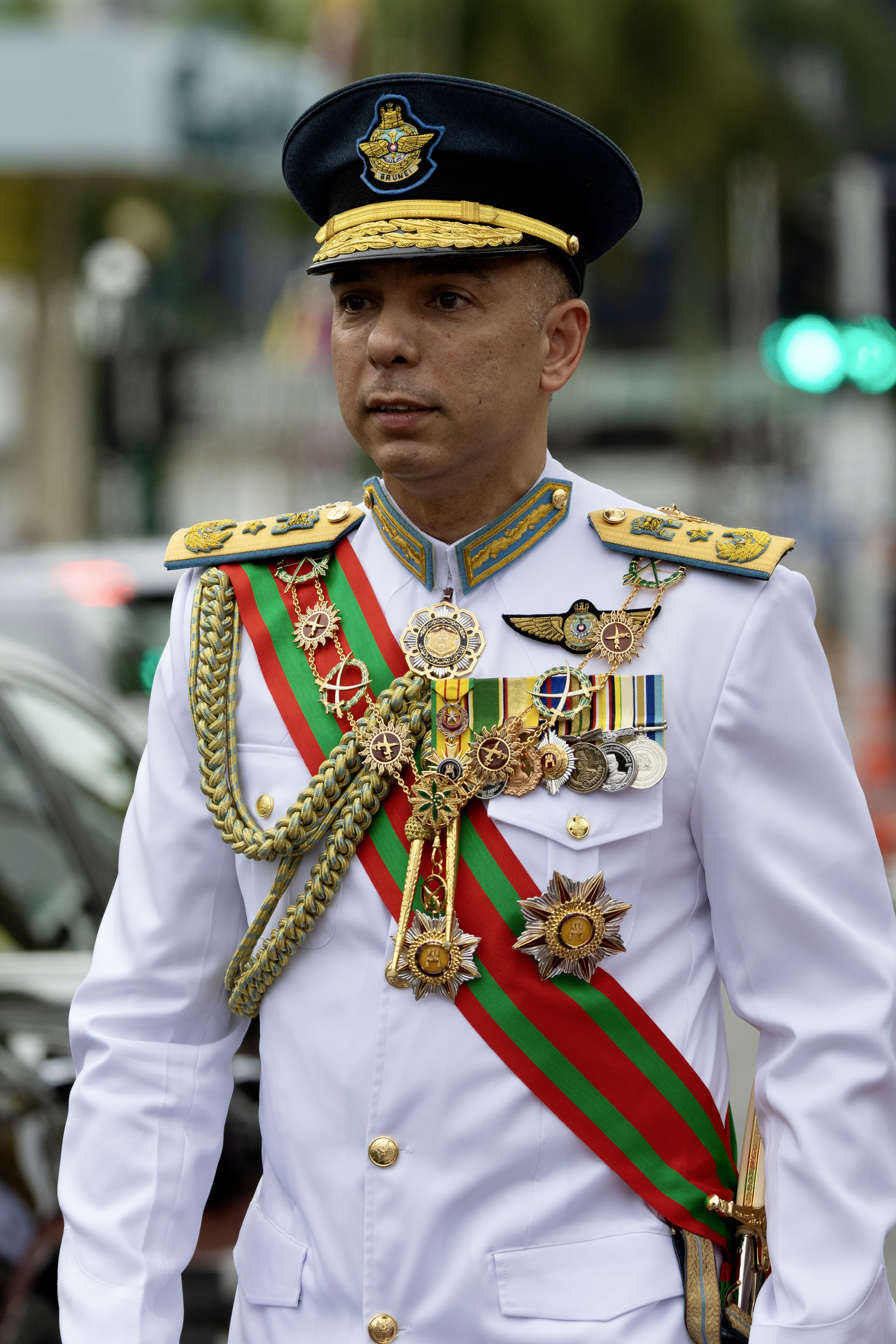
- Brigadier general Mohammad Sharif in 2024

Deputy Commander of the Royal Brunei Armed Forces
- Incumbent
- Assumed office 2 January 2025
- Monarch: Hassanal Bolkiah
- Commander: Haszaimi Bol Hassan

15th Commander of the Royal Brunei Air Force
- In office 28 August 2020 – 10 January 2025
- Deputy: Haszahaidi Ahmad Daud
- Preceded by: Hamzah Sahat
- Succeeded by: Haszahaidi Ahmad Daud

Personal details
- Born: Brunei
- Spouse: Noraidah Ibrahim
- Education: King's College London (MA); University of Madras (MPhil)
- Profession: Military officer; pilot; flight instructor

Military service
- Allegiance: Brunei
- Branch/service: Royal Brunei Air Force
- Years of service: 1993–present
- Rank: Brigadier General
- Unit: No. 5 Squadron (CN 235); Training Wing (PC-7 Mk.II)
- Commands: Royal Brunei Air Force; Operations Group RBAirF; Joint Force Commander

Mohammad Sharif bin Haji Ibrahim is a Bruneian airman who is the deputy commander of the Royal Brunei Armed Forces (RBAF) since 2025. He was the former commander of the Royal Brunei Air Force (RBAirF) from 2020 to 2025. He became the first commanding officer (CO) of the Officer Cadet School (OCS), Defence Academy Royal Brunei Armed Forces (DA RBAF), programme manager at the Centre of Science and Technology Research and Development (CSTRAD), and the country's first defence attaché in Washington, D.C. in the United States.

== Military career ==
In February 1993, Mohammad Sharif enlisted into the Royal Brunei Air Force (RBAirF), being assigned 413 as his service number. He subsequently commissioned in February 1994, after finishing the Initial Officer Training at the Royal Air Force College Cranwell near Cranwell in England, United Kingdom. During his time at RAF Cranwell, he attended basic flying training and multi-engine flying, which would go on to allow him to fly the IPTN CN 235, a twin-engined transport aircraft. In 1999, Mohammad Sharif went to Singapore to attend the Flying Instructor's Course, in return be able to instruct pilots in the IPTN CN 235 and Pilatus PC-7 Mk.II back in Brunei.

Mohammad Sharif was appointed as the Director of Intelligence in the Ministry of Defence on 19 March 2018, and later became the Joint Force Commander of the RBAF on 19 April 2019. He succeeded Hamzah Sahat as the 15th commander of the RBAirF on 28 August 2020. The handover ceremony between the two was held at Royal Brunei Air Force Base, Rimba, near Bandar Seri Begawan.

During the Royal Brunei Air Force's 55th anniversary ceremony parade at the Air Movement Centre (AMC), Royal Brunei Air Force Base, Rimba, on 24 June 2021, he made a statement to Borneo Bulletin,

The Royal Brunei Air Force (RBAirF) strives to always continue its role and duties effectively.

— Mohammad Sharif Ibrahim, Borneo Bulletin, 24 June 2021

Mohammad Sharif oversaw the decommissioning of the RBAirF No. 1 Squadron's entire Bolkow BO105 helicopter fleet after 41 years of service. The retirement ceremony was held at the Air Movement Centre (AMC), Royal Brunei Air Force Base, Rimba, on 5 February 2022. On 2 January 2025, he was appointed as deputy commander of the RBAF, followed by the ending of his RBAirF commander on 10 January 2025.

=== Military education ===
Throughout his career, Mohammad Sharif attended several institutes and training overseas, including the Royal New Zealand Air Force (RNZAF) Junior Staff Course at the New Zealand Defence College, Upper Hutt in 2001; the Joint Services Command and Staff College, Shrivenham, United Kingdom in 2008; the National Defence College, New Delhi, India in 2014; and the Higher Defence Course in Spain in 2016. From 2008 to 2014, he also obtained Master of Arts (MA) in Defence studies from King's College London, United Kingdom, and a Master of Philosophy (MPhil) in Defence and Strategic Studies from Madras University, Chennai, India.

== Personal life ==
Mohammad Sharif is married to Noraidah binti Haji Ibrahim, and together they have two children. In addition, he enjoys running and cycling.

== Honours ==
National

- Order of Pahlawan Negara Brunei First Class (PSPNB; 15 July 2019) – Dato Seri Pahlawan
- Order of Setia Negara Brunei Fourth Class (PSB)
- Order of Seri Paduka Mahkota Brunei Third Class (SMB; 19 August 2017)
- Excellent Service Medal (PIKB)
- Sultan of Brunei Golden Jubilee Medal (5 October 2017)
- General Service Medal (Armed Forces)
- Royal Brunei Armed Forces Golden Jubilee Medal (31 May 2011)
- Royal Brunei Armed Forces Diamond Jubilee Medal (31 May 2021)

Foreign

- France:
  - Recipient of the National Defence Medal (Gold Grade) (27 February 2026)
- Malaysia:
  - Courageous Commander of the Most Gallant Order of Military Service (PGAT; 2024)
- Singapore:
  - Pingat Jasa Gemilang (Tentera) (PJG; 11 May 2022)
  - RSAF Honorary Wings (11 May 2022)
- United Kingdom:
  - Royal Air Force College Cranwell Student Medal
- United States:
  - Commander of the Legion of Merit (5 February 2026)

Military offices
Preceded by Hamzah Sahat	15th Commander of the Royal Brunei Air Force; 28 August 2020 – 10 January 2025	Succeeded by Haszahaidi Ahmad Daud
Preceded by Hamzah Sahat	Joint Force Commander of the Royal Brunei Armed Forces; 19 April 2019 – 28 August 2020	Succeeded by Abdul Razak
