= Pengiran Aminan =

Bruneian military officer (born 1968)

Major General (Retired) Pengiran Dato Paduka Seri Pengiran Aminan PSPNB DPKT DPMB PSB PGAT GCCT
- ڤڠيرن امينان
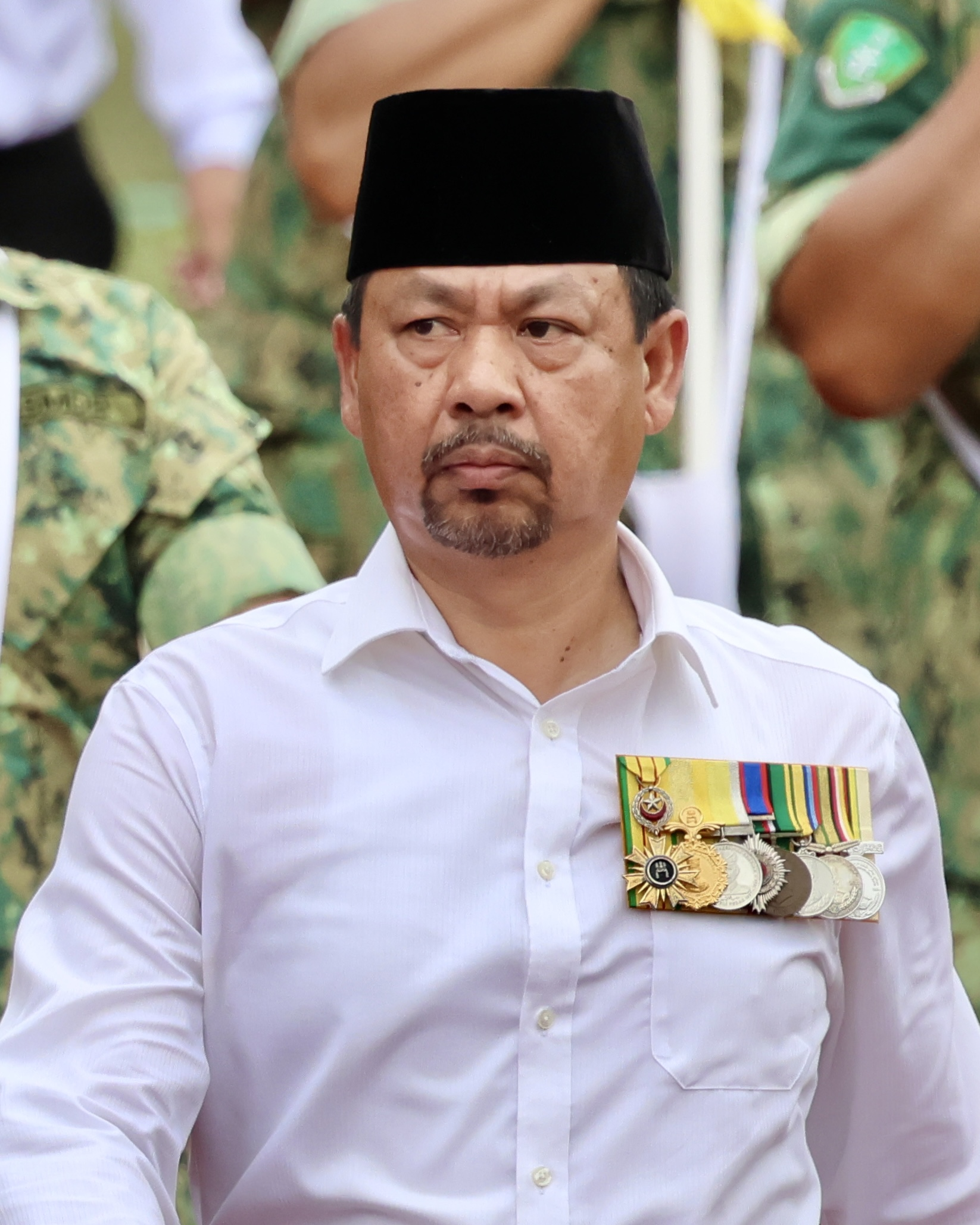
- Pengiran Aminan in 2024

10th Commander of the Royal Brunei Armed Forces
- In office 31 January 2018 – 1 September 2020
- Monarch: Hassanal Bolkiah
- Preceded by: Mohammad Tawih
- Succeeded by: Hamzah Sahat

9th Commander of the Royal Brunei Land Force
- In office 1 December 2014 – 31 January 2018
- Deputy: Haszaimi Bol Hassan
- Preceded by: Yussof Abdul Rahman
- Succeeded by: Khairul Hamed

Personal details
- Born: 9 June 1968 (age 58) Brunei
- Spouse: Rasidah Brahim
- Education: Training Institute Royal Brunei Armed Forces; Royal College of Defence Studies
- Occupation: Military officer

Military service
- Allegiance: Brunei
- Branch/service: Royal Brunei Land Force
- Years of service: 1985–2020
- Rank: Major General
- Commands: Directorate of Strategic Planning; Royal Brunei Land Force; Royal Brunei Armed Forces

Pengiran Aminan bin Pengiran Haji Mahmud (born 9 June 1968) is a Bruneian nobleman and military officer, who previously served as the tenth Commander of the Royal Brunei Armed Forces (RBAF) from 2018 until 2020. He was previously the ninth Commander of the Royal Brunei Land Force (RBLF).

== Military career ==
Pengiran Aminan enlisted with the Royal Brunei Armed Forces (RBAF) on 9 December 1985 and was assigned 286 as his service number. Subsequently, upon completion of his initial officer training, he graduated from the Training Institute Royal Brunei Armed Forces at Penanjong Garrison as a second lieutenant on 20 December 1987. He then attended the Officer Cadet Course in Singapore. During his time in service, he was appointed to several positions; which include: infantry platoon commander, technical instructor at Training Institute (TI RBAF), SO2 G1 of Royal Brunei Service Force, SO2 and military assistant to Commander of the RBAF, and senior management officer at the Office of Strategy Management Ministry of Defence (MINDEF). From 2007 until 2009, he was the aide-de-camp to the Sultan of Brunei, and later in 2010, he became the director at Directorate of Strategic Planning. On 7 February 2014, Aminan began his duty as the acting Deputy Commander of Royal Brunei Land Force (RBLF). That same year on 1 December, he became the 9th commander of the RBLF.

Pengiran Aminan was promoted to brigadier general on 6 February 2015, and to major general upon his appointment as Commander of the Royal Brunei Armed Forces on 31 January 2018. Pengiran Aminan retired from the armed forces on 1 September 2020. His position as Commander of RBAF was succeeded by Hamzah Sahat.

=== Military education and training ===
Aminan obtained a National Diploma Engineering, and Foundation Degree of Engineering in Mechanical Engineering in 1989 in the United Kingdom, Junior Officer Management Course in 1994, Unit Security Officers in 1994, and Combat Intelligence Officer in 1995 in Singapore, Bachelor of Engineering in 1997 in the United Kingdom, All Arms Tactics in 1999 in Malaysia, Command and Staff Course in 2000 in Singapore, Royal College of Defence Studies in 2010 in United Kingdom, and Leaders in Development in 2012 in United States.

=== Effective dates of promotion ===
Aminan Mahmud promotions
insignia	rank	date
	Second Lieutenant	20 Dec 1987
	Lieutenant Colonel	1 Jan 2009
	Colonel	5 Feb 2010
	Brigadier General	6 Feb 2015
	Major General	31 Jan 2018

== Personal life ==
Aminan is married to Rasidah binti Brahim. They have three daughters together.

== Honours ==
=== National ===
- Order of Paduka Keberanian Laila Terbilang First Class (DPKT; 15 July 2018) – Dato Paduka Seri
- Order of Pahlawan Negara Brunei First Class (PSPNB; 15 August 2015) – Dato Seri Pahlawan
- Order of Seri Paduka Mahkota Brunei Second Class (DPMB; 15 July 2012) – Dato Paduka
- Order of Setia Negara Brunei Fourth Class (PSB)
- Sultan of Brunei Silver Jubilee Medal (5 October 1992)
- Sultan of Brunei Golden Jubilee Medal (5 October 2017)
- General Service Medal (Armed Forces)
- Long Service Medal and Good Conduct (PKLPB)
- Royal Brunei Armed Forces Golden Jubilee Medal (31 May 2011)
- Royal Brunei Armed Forces Diamond Jubilee Medal (31 May 2021)

=== Foreign ===
- Malaysia:
  - Courageous Commander of The Most Gallant Order of Military Service (PGAT)
  - Honorary Airborne Wing of the 10th Paratrooper Brigade (10th PARA)
- Philippines:
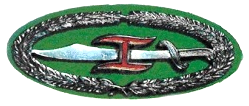
  - Philippine Army Combat Commander's Badge
- Singapore:
  - Darjah Utama Bakti Cemerlang (Tentera) (DUBC)
  - Pingat Jasa Gemilang (Tentera) (PJG)
- Thailand:
  - Knight Grand Cross of the Order of the Crown of Thailand (PM (GCCT); 10 April 2021)
  - Royal Thai Army Jump Wings

Military offices
Preceded by Yussof Abdul Rahman	9th Commander of the Royal Brunei Land Force; 1 December 2014 – 31 January 2018	Succeeded by Khairul Hamed
Preceded by Mohammad Tawih	10th Commander of the Royal Brunei Armed Forces; 31 January 2018 – 1 September 2020	Succeeded by Hamzah Sahat
Preceded by Zainal Ariffin	Acting Deputy Commander of the Royal Brunei Land Force; 7 February 2014 – 1 December 2014	Succeeded by Haszaimi Bol Hassan
