= George Edwin Coster =

British aviator and police officer

Yang Dimuliakan Pehin Datu Permakawi Diraja Flight Lieutenant Dato Seri Pahlawan George Edwin Coster OBE CPM PSPNB DSNB DPMB PHBS PJK PIKB PKL
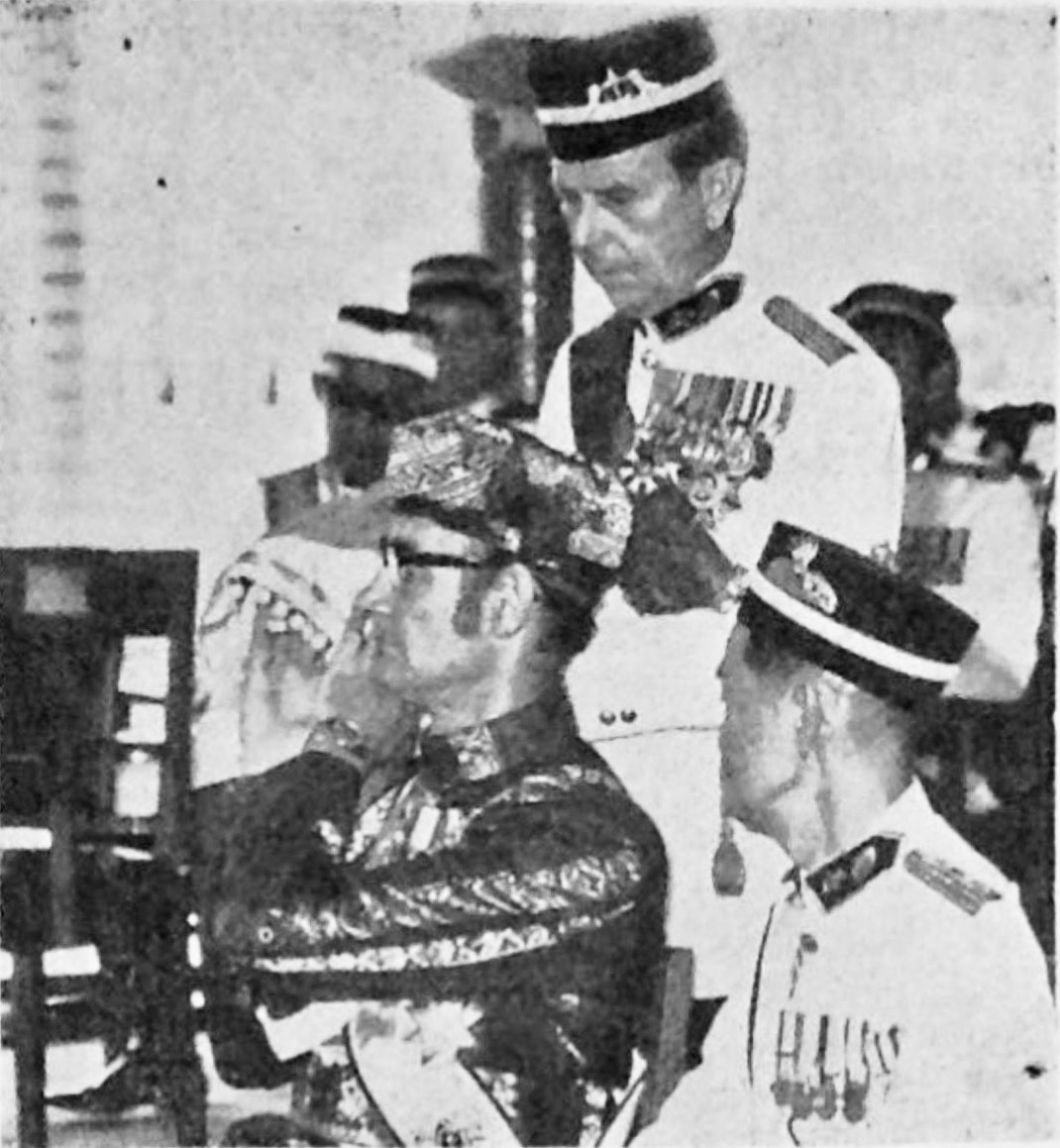
- Coster (standing) at Lapau in 1973
- Born: 9 January 1924; Hendon, Middlesex, England
- Died: October 2014 (aged 90)
- Education: Wadham College
- Occupations: Aviator; police officer
- Known for: Member of Privy Council for Sultan Omar Ali Saifuddien III
- Military career
- Allegiance: United Kingdom
- Branch: Royal Air Force
- Rank: Flight lieutenant
- Units: Home Guard; Transport Command
- Conflicts: World War II; Burma Campaign

Flight Lieutenant George Edwin "Peter" Coster OBE (9 January 1924 – October 2014) or also referred to as G.E. Coster, was a British aviator and police officer from England who served in several high-ranking positions which included being a member of the Brunei Privy Council and Assistant Brunei Police Commissioner.

== Military career ==
Born in Hendon, Middlesex on 9 January 1924, Coster received his education at St Marylebone Grammar School in St John's Wood. Along with his classmates, he was evacuated to Redruth, at the start of World War II. There, he was billeted by the Portreath bank manager and enlisted in the local Home Guard. Coster attended Wadham College in Oxford, where he excelled in languages and modern history, before receiving a commission in the Royal Air Force. Coster finished his training in Canada and went back to flying Bristol Beaufighters in the European Theatre, but after the Third Reich fell, he was sent to Transport Command in India, where he flew Douglas DC-3s and trained on glider tugs as the war was coming to a conclusion in the Pacific War. Repatriating prisoners of war from Burma and bringing them back to Singapore was one of his last tasks.

== Law enforcement career ==
After taking a break, Coster launched a tiny commercial airline from Hong Kong, but it never really got off the ground. Shortly after, in time for the emergency, he accepted a position in the Federation of Malaya Police's Special Branch. Numerous opportunities arose from this job, one of which was a Commendation for his assistance in recovering the remains of Sir Henry Gurney, the British High Commissioner who was killed in an ambush on Peter's Hill on 6 October 1951.

In 1963, Coster signed a contract with the Royal Brunei Police and was first assigned as an Assistant Commissioner in the Special Branch. He completely revolutionised and reorganised the force in this capacity, eventually rising to the position of Head of Intelligence and Security for Sultan Omar Ali Saifuddien III. The Sultan was obviously pleased with Coster's performance since he bestowed upon him several honours and appointed him to the Privy Council on 2 July 1973.

In June 1969, a news conference was convened after special agents seized more than 700 items from Chinese propaganda that had been brought in from Hong Kong over the previous two months. During the conference, which was attended by local traders (among others), Coster advised local vendors to exercise caution when importing products to Brunei. He stated that there was a legal ban in Brunei on activities that provoked strong emotions, particularly those that supported communists or communist ideology, because they jeopardized the interest and security of the country.

In the wake of the 1975 flight of some former Brunei rebels to Malaysia, Sultan Omar Ali Saifuddien III implemented a number of security measures. The sultan then proposed that intelligence from the British should compensate for any information lost due to the split with the east Malaysian Special Branches. Coster, supported by the Commissioner of Police, declined the Sultan's proposal, citing Brunei's potential loss of intelligence services from such connections.

Coster retired in 1989 and died in October 2014.

== Titles, styles and honours ==
Coster was bestowed the Manteri title of Yang Dimuliakan Pehin Datu Permakawi Diraja by Sultan Omar Ali Saifuddien III on 20 April 1973. He earned the following honours;

National

- Order of the British Empire Officer (OBE; 1969)
- Colonial Police Medal (CPM; 1966) for Meritorious Service
- 1939–1945 Star
- War Medal 1939–1945
- Burma Star
- Defence Medal
- General Service Medal (1918 GSM) with Malaya clasp

Foreign

- Brunei:
  - Order of Pahlawan Negara Brunei First Class (PSPNB) – Dato Seri Pahlawan
  - Order of Setia Negara Brunei Second Class (DSNB) – Dato Setia
  - Order of Seri Paduka Mahkota Brunei Second Class (DPMB) – Dato Paduka
  - Sultan Hassanal Bolkiah Medal First Class (PHBS; 12 February 1969)
  - Meritorious Service Medal (PJK)
  - Excellent Service Medal (PIKB)
  - Long Service Medal (PKL)
  - Coronation Medal (1 August 1968)
  - Royal Police Medal 1965
- Malaysia:
  - Active Service Medal (PKB)
