= Pengiran Norazmi =

Bruneian naval officer and diplomat

His Excellency First Admiral (Retired) Dato Seri Pahlawan Pengiran Norazmi PSPNB
- ڤڠيرن نورازمي
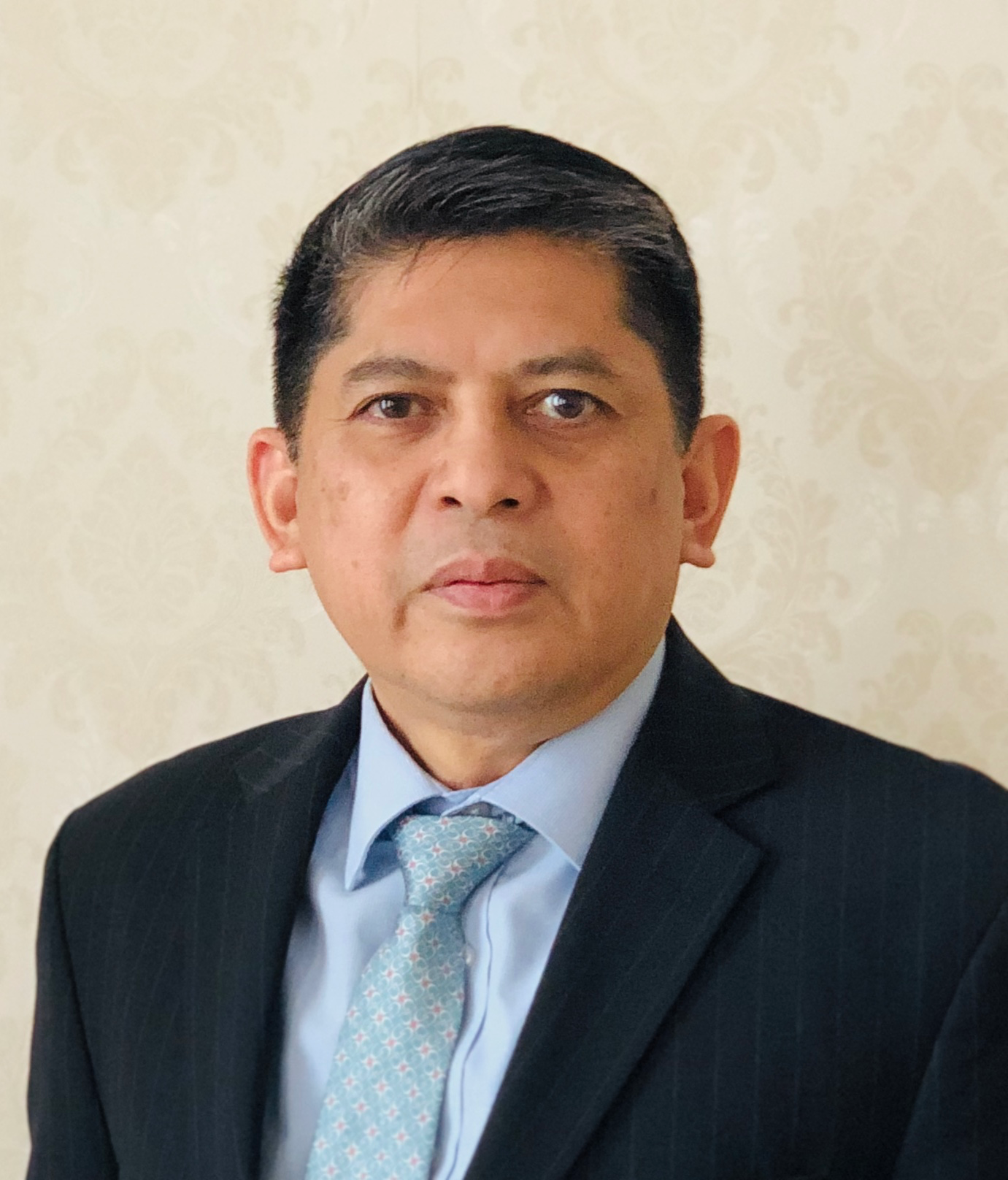
- Pengiran Norazmi in 2025

High Commissioner of Brunei to the United Kingdom
- Incumbent
- Assumed office 20 June 2020
- Preceded by: Rooslina Weti

10th Commander of the Royal Brunei Navy
- In office 13 March 2015 – 19 April 2019
- Monarch: Hassanal Bolkiah
- Deputy: Othman Suhaili
- Preceded by: Abdul Aziz
- Succeeded by: Othman Suhaili

Personal details
- Born: Brunei
- Spouse: Noralam Kahar
- Children: 6
- Education: Britannia Royal Naval College; Malaysia Armed Forces Defense College; Naval War College; Harvard Kennedy School
- Profession: Military officer and diplomat

Military service
- Allegiance: Brunei
- Branch/service: Royal Brunei Navy
- Years of service: 1987–2019
- Rank: First Admiral
- Unit: Missile Gunboats; Offshore patrol vessels
- Commands: Royal Brunei Navy Fleet; Royal Brunei Navy

Pengiran Dato Norazmi bin Pengiran Haji Muhammad, also referred to as Pg Norazmi, is a Bruneian military officer and diplomat who is the current High Commissioner of Brunei Darussalam to the United Kingdom since 2020. Additionally, he formerly took office as the tenth commander of the Royal Brunei Navy (RBN) from 2015 to 2019.

== Education ==
Pengiran Norazmi is a 2011 National University of Malaysia Master of Social Science (Defence Studies) alumnus of the Malaysian Armed Forces Defense College. During his time in Malaysia, he had made a name for himself by being the college's hall of fame and as their 8th member. He has taken a variety of courses both domestically and overseas throughout his career, including International Sub Lieutenant, International Long Navigation, and International Principle Warfare Officer in the United Kingdom. He completed the Junior Staff Course for the Royal New Zealand Air Force in 1996, the Naval Staff Course at the Naval War College in the United States in 2003, and the Senior Executives in National and International Security program at the Harvard Kennedy School in December 2014.

== Military career ==
Pengiran Norazmi graduated as a midshipman from the Britannia Royal Naval College in the United Kingdom in 1989 before joining the Royal Brunei Armed Forces (RBAF) in September 1987. He was appointed as the deputy commander of the RBN in November 2012 and promoted to captain in the following year. He held this position until 6 March 2015, when he was appointed as the commander of the RBN. On 29 May 2015, he was elevated to the rank of first admiral with the approval of Sultan Hassanal Bolkiah.

During an introduction trip to the Philippines, Pengiran Norazmi spoke with his colleague about measures to improve bilateral relations and cooperation. From 8 to 9 June 2015, he led a trip to the Philippines with his spouse at his side. He received a guard of honour during his visit and was cordially welcomed by Vice Admiral Jesus C. Milan at the Philippine Navy Headquarters. The two navy leaders had amicable conversations about expanding their countries' exchanges and cooperation. Vice Admiral Milan honored him by giving him the Flag Rank Command Badge for his visit.

Historically close bilateral relations between the Republic of Singapore Navy (RSN) and RBN further developed under Norazmi's direction. Both fleets celebrated the 35th iteration of Exercise Pelican and remembered 40 years of defense cooperation in 2016. With improved naval combat and the incorporation of naval aviation, Exercise Pelican expanded in scale and complexity. Norazmi also supported the Western Pacific Naval Symposium Multilateral Sea Exercises in 2015 and 2017, as well as Singapore's first-ever International Maritime Review in 2017.

Pengiran Norazmi invited Admiral Yutaka Murakawa, Chief of Staff of the Japanese Maritime Self Defence Force (JMSDF), to Brunei from 31 January to 2 February 2019. They expressed their appreciation for the cordial and amicable relationships between the two nations' fleets during the phone chat. On 19 April that year, the handover ceremony of First Admiral Othman Suhaili from Pengiran Norazmi was held at the Muara Naval Base. The inspection of the guard of honor, a march parade, a goodbye address by the departing RBN commander, a signing ceremony for the handover certificates, and blessings for the ceremony were among the several events that took place.

== Diplomatic career ==
On 20 June 2020, His Excellency Pengiran Norazmi was appointed as the new High Commissioner for Brunei Darussalam in London. On 17 September 2020, alongside Hairy Erwandy Raya, the Defense Advisor, paid a visit to the Headquarters Brigade of Gurkhas at Camberley. On 10 December 2020, via video link, Queen Elizabeth II received His Excellency Pengiran Norazmi and gave him his own Letters of Commission as High Commissioner as well as the Letters of recall of his predecessor. Along with Pengiran Dato Yusof Sepiuddin, Special Duty Officer, and Fahmi Abas, Religious Officer, Norazmi visited the London Islamic Cultural Centre on 22 February 2023. The Brunei National Day was celebrated in the center by the delegation headed by His Excellency.

== Personal life ==
Pengiran Norazmi is married to Pengiran Datin Noralam binti Pengiran Haji Kahar, and together they have six children; 4 sons and 2 daughters. He enjoys jogging, mountain biking, and golf.

== Honours ==
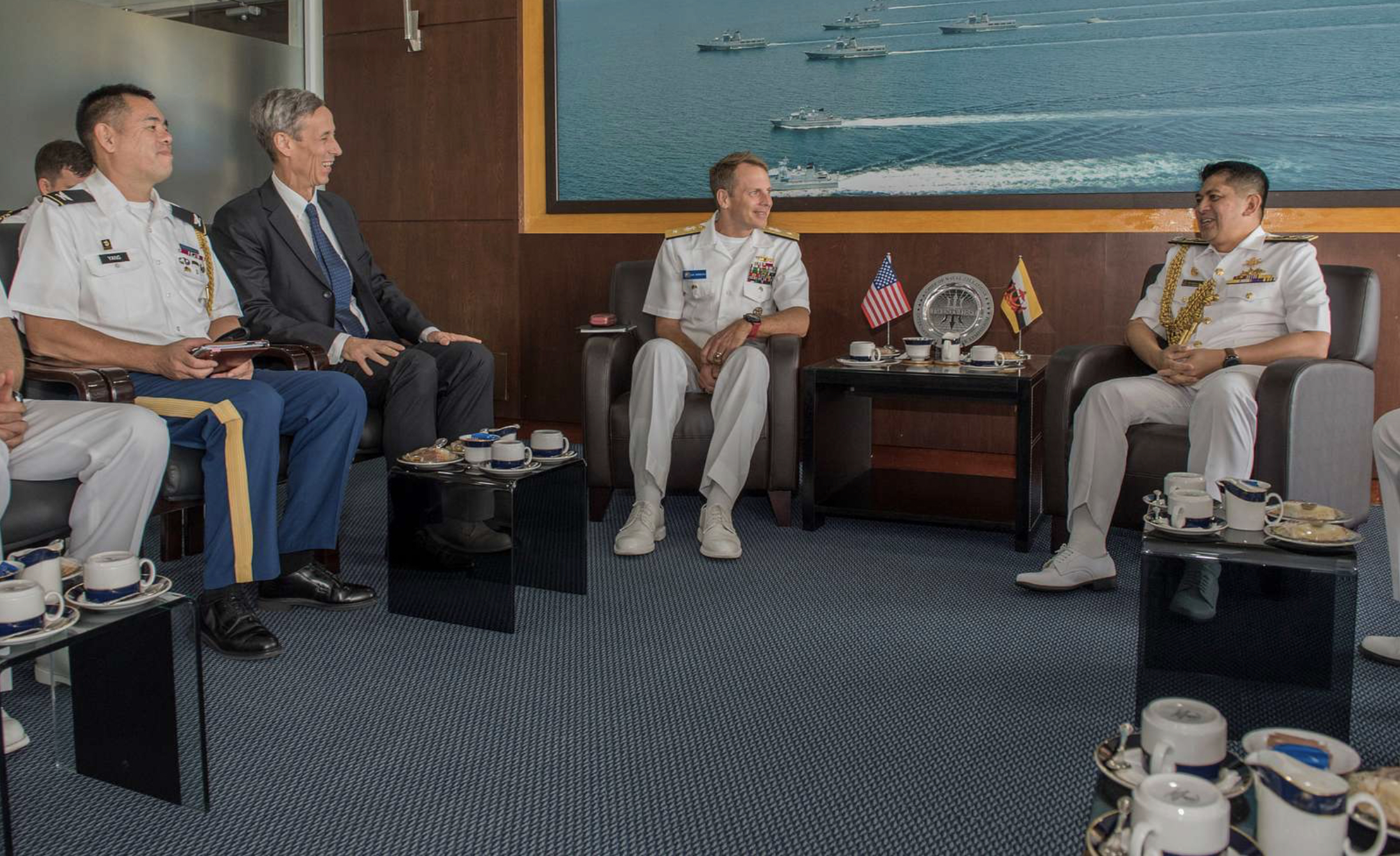
Pengiran Norazmi, Rear Adm. Don Gabrielson, and Craig B. Allen hold a meeting at his office during CARAT 2017

Pengiran Norazmi has earned the following honours;

=== National ===
- Order of Pahlawan Negara Brunei First Class (PSPNB; 15 August 2015) – Dato Seri Pahlawan
- Sultan of Brunei Silver Jubilee Medal (5 October 1992)
- Sultan of Brunei Golden Jubilee Medal (5 October 2017)
- National Day Silver Jubilee Medal (23 February 2009)
- General Service Medal (Armed Forces)
- Royal Brunei Armed Forces Golden Jubilee Medal (31 May 2011)

=== Foreign ===
- Singapore:
  - Pingat Jasa Gemilang (Tentera) (PJG; 10 October 2017)
- Philippines:
  - Flag Rank Command Badge (June 2015)

Diplomatic posts
Preceded by Rooslina Weti	High Commissioner of Brunei to the United Kingdom; 20 June 2020 – present	Succeeded by Incumbent
Military offices
Preceded by Abdul Aziz	10th Commander of the Royal Brunei Navy; 13 March 2015 – 19 April 2019	Succeeded by Othman Suhaili
