= Mohammad Tawih =

Bruneian military officer (born 1964)

Yang Dimuliakan Pehin Datu Pekerma Jaya Major General (Retired) Dato Paduka Seri Mohammad Tawih PSPNB DPKT SMB PGAT GCCT
- محمد تاويه
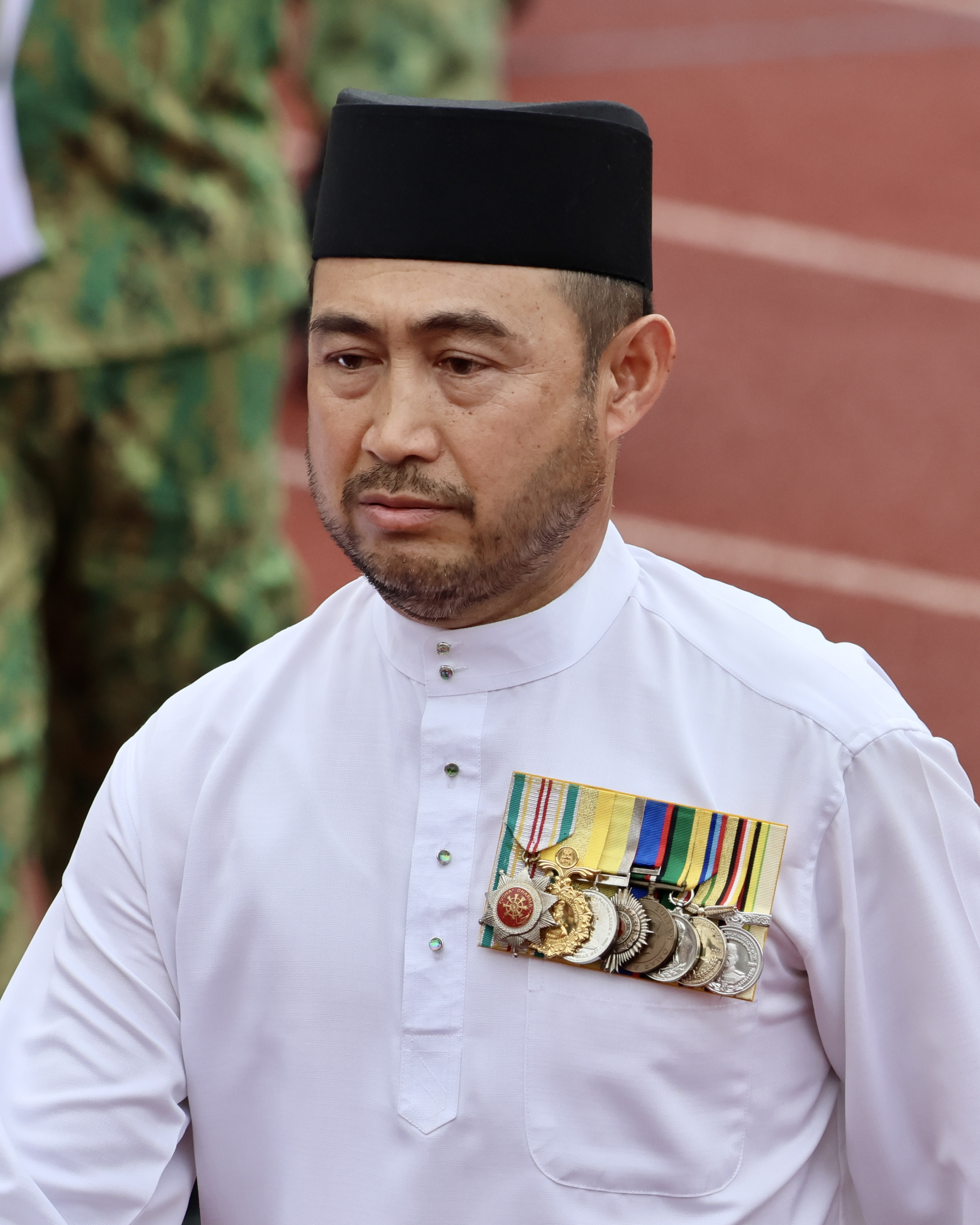
- Pehin Tawih in 2024

9th Commander of the Royal Brunei Armed Forces
- In office 30 February 2014 – 31 January 2018
- Monarch: Hassanal Bolkiah
- Deputy: Yussof Abdul Rahman
- Preceded by: Aminuddin Ihsan
- Succeeded by: Pengiran Aminan

Personal details
- Born: 9 June 1964 (age 62) Brunei
- Spouse: Zulia Basman
- Education: Deakin University (MA)
- Profession: Military officer

Military service
- Allegiance: Brunei
- Branch/service: Royal Brunei Land Force
- Years of service: 1982–2018
- Rank: Major General
- Commands: 'D' Company 1st Battalion RBLF; Training Institute RBAF

Mohammad Tawih bin Abdullah (born 9 June 1964) is a Bruneian aristocrat and retired military officer who became the ninth Commander of the Royal Brunei Armed Forces (RBAF) who serves from 2014 until 2018.

== Education ==
From January until December 1984, he underwent training at the Officer Cadet School, Portsea, Australia. Throughout his career, he was sent to several training institutes which include the Platoon Commander Course at Army Combat Training Centre (PULADA), Johor Bahru, Malaysia in 1985, Royal School of Military Engineering, Kent, England, from 1987 until 1988, Company Tactic Course and Battalion Tactic Course in Singapore and the Intermediate Operation Course at the Land Warfare Centre, Canungra, Australia, Command and Staff Course at the Malaysian Armed Forces Staff College, Kuala Lumpur, Malaysia, in 1997, Australian Centre for Defence and Strategic Studies (ACDSS) at Weston Creek, Canberra, Australia in 2007 and obtained a Master of Arts (MA) in Strategic studies from Deakin University, Australia.

== Military career ==
On 6 December 1982, he enlisted as a potential officer cadet in the RBAF and later underwent basic training at the Recruit Training Centre, Bolkiah Camp. Appointed as an officer cadet with service number 235 after training completion on 1 July 1983. Upon completing his training at the Officer Cadet School in Australia, he was promoted to second lieutenant. He was later assigned as the Rifle Platoon Commander with 'D' Company 1st Battalion RBLF. Pehin Tawih became an Engineer Field Troop Commander in 1986 and he would then be upgraded to a captain in 1990.

Pehin Tawih holds the position of a Staff Officer Grade 3 G1 and Company Commander of Command Company 2nd Battalion RBLF, respectively in 1990 and from 1993 until 1996. He became a major in 1994, and a Staff Officer Grade 2 to the RBAF commander from 1998 before being redirected to Operations and Training at Headquarters RBLF in 1999. From 2000 until 2001, he was the deputy commander of the 3rd Battalion RBLF before being the commander of the same battalion until 2003.

In 2002, Pehin Tawih was promoted to a lieutenant colonel and assigned to the Directorate of Operations Ministry of Defence as Staff Officer Grade 1 Operations from 2003 until 2005. The title of Yang Dimuliakan Pehin Datu Pekerma Jaya was bestowed to him with the consent of Sultan Hassanal Bolkiah in 2004. He was assigned to the Director of Personnel at the Ministry of Defence in early 2006 and became the Acting Deputy Commander of RBLF in February of that same year. In October 2008, he was promoted to the rank of colonel and became commander of Training Institute Royal Brunei Armed Forces (TI RBAF). He achieved the rank of brigadier general on 25 May 2011.

On 30 January 2014, He succeeded Aminuddin Ihsan and became the 9th Commander of the RBAF. In 2016, Edmundo R. Pangilinan, commander of the 6th Infantry Division, welcomed Mohammad Tawih and Police Commissioner Mohammad Jammy at the Cotabato Airport, Maguindanao, Philippines. They were making an annual visit to Brunei UN peacekeepers in Mindanao. Few days later on 31 January 2018, Pehin Tawih officially retires from military service and his position succeeded by Aminan Mahmud. Commander of U.S. Pacific Command, Admiral Harry B. Harris Jr. awarded the Legion of Merit to Pehin Tawih at the residence of U.S. Ambassador Craig B. Allen on 21 February 2018.

== Personal life ==
Mohammad Tawih is married to Zulia binti Basman and has four children together. He enjoys playing association football and golf.

== Honours ==
Mohammad Tawih was bestowed the Manteri title of Yang Dimuliakan Pehin Datu Pekerma Jaya on 1 April 2004. Additionally he has earned the following honours:

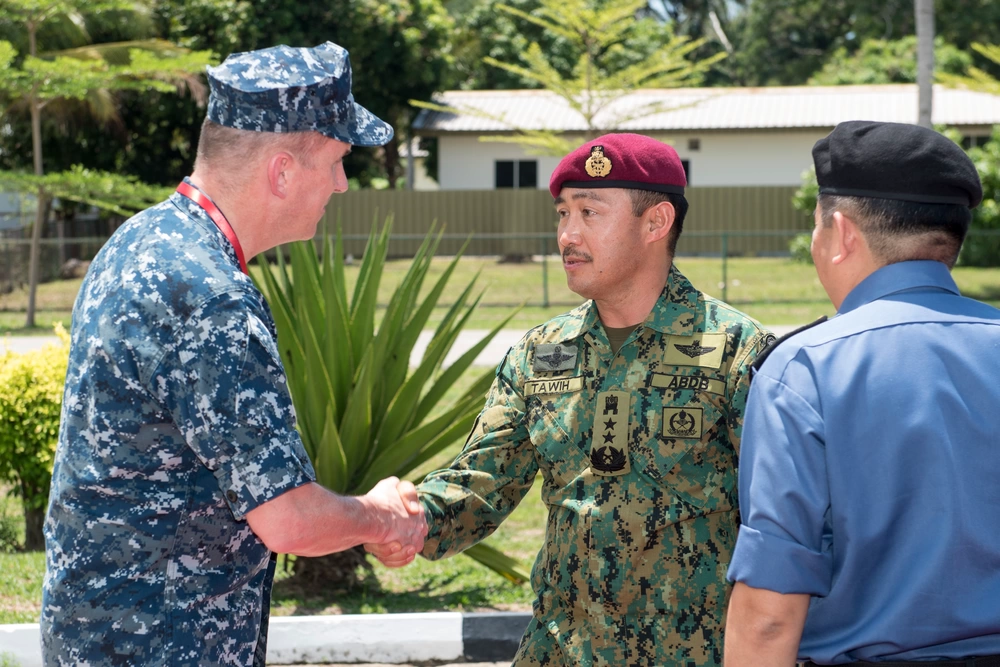
Tawih meeting Rear Adm. Charles Williams during the opening ceremony of ADMM Plus Maritime Security and Counterterrorism Field Training Exercise in 2016

National

- Order of Pahlawan Negara Brunei First Class (PSPNB; 15 July 2011) – Dato Seri Pahlawan
- Order of Paduka Keberanian Laila Terbilang First Class (DPKT) – Dato Paduka Seri
- Order of Seri Paduka Mahkota Brunei Third Class (SMB)
- Sultan of Brunei Golden Jubilee Medal (5 October 2017)
- Sultan of Brunei Silver Jubilee Medal (5 October 1992)
- General Service Medal
- Long Service Medal and Good Conduct (PKLPB)
- Royal Brunei Armed Forces Silver Jubilee Medal (31 May 1986)
- Royal Brunei Armed Forces Golden Jubilee Medal (31 May 2011)
- Royal Brunei Armed Forces Diamond Jubilee Medal (31 May 2021)
- Honorary Member of the Special Forces Regiment (12 February 2016)

Foreign

- United States:
  - Commander of the Legion of Merit (21 February 2018)
- Singapore:
  - Darjah Utama Bakti Cemerlang (Tentera) (DUBC; 21 April 2015)
- Thailand:
  - Knight Grand Cross of the Order of the Crown of Thailand First Class (PM (GCCT))
- Malaysia:
  - Courageous Commander of The Most Gallant Order of Military Service (PGAT)
- Indonesia:
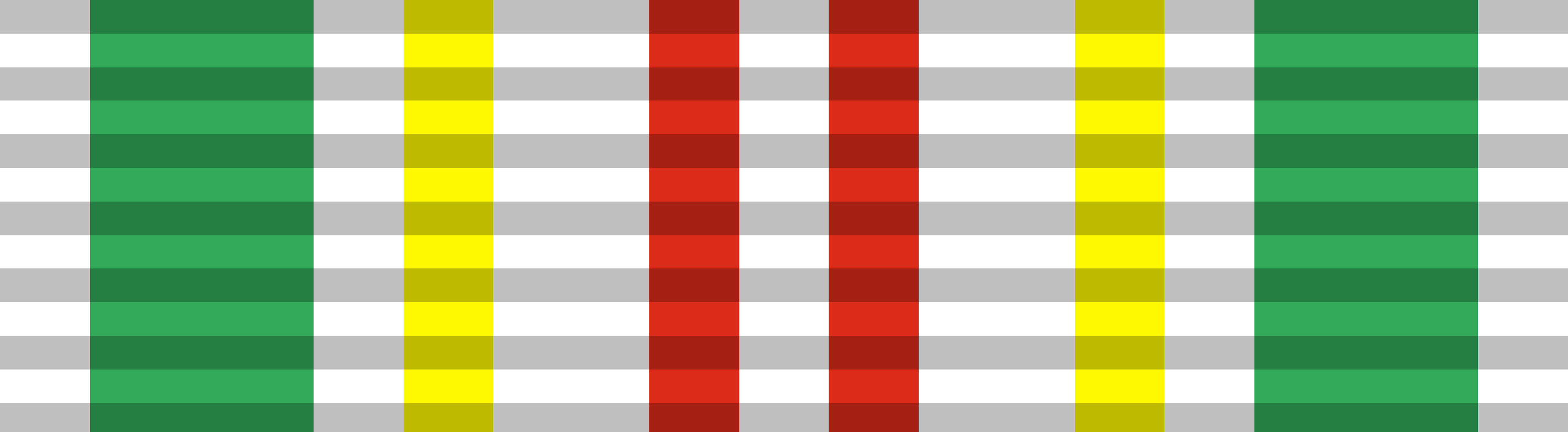
  - Bintang Yudha Dharma Utama (BYD)

Military offices
Preceded by Aminuddin Ihsan	9th Commander of the Royal Brunei Armed Forces; 30 February 2014 – 31 January 2018	Succeeded by Pengiran Aminan
Preceded by Said Puteh	17th Commander of the Training Institute; 1 December 2008 – 24 May 2011	Succeeded by Zulkifli bin Ismail
