= Othman Suhaili =

Bruneian naval officer (born 1970)

First Admiral (Retired) Dato Seri Pahlawan Othman Suhaili PSPNB SMB PSB
- عثمان سوهايلي
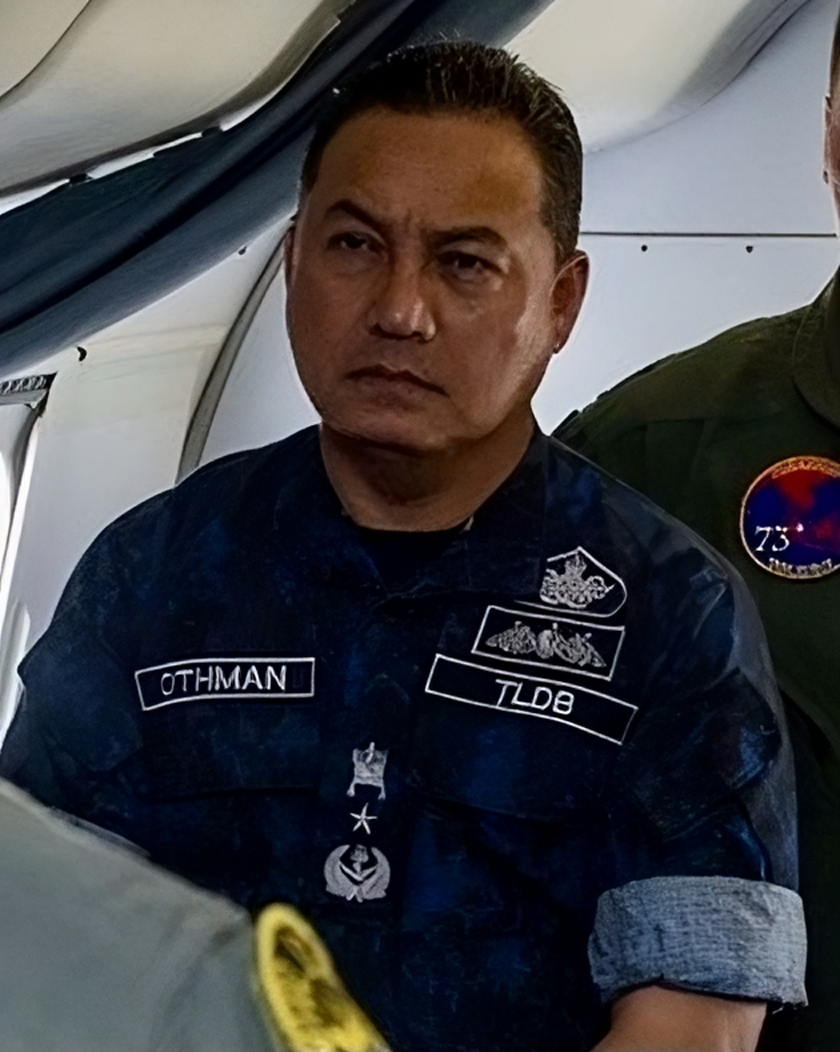
- First admiral Othman during CARAT 2019

11th Commander of the Royal Brunei Navy
- In office 19 April 2019 – 31 December 2020
- Monarch: Hassanal Bolkiah
- Deputy: Mohamad Damit
- Preceded by: Pengiran Norazmi
- Succeeded by: Spry Serudi

Personal details
- Born: 19 April 1970 (age 56) Brunei
- Spouse: Nazatulshima C.A. Mohamed
- Children: 4
- Education: Britannia Royal Naval College; Malaysia Armed Forces Defense College; National University of Singapore
- Profession: Naval officer

Military service
- Allegiance: Brunei
- Branch/service: Royal Brunei Navy
- Years of service: 1989–2020
- Rank: First Admiral
- Unit: HMAS Ipswich (FCPB 209)
- Commands: KDB Pemburu (P-15); KDB Penyerang (P-16); KDB Perwira (P-14); KDB Seteria (P-04); Royal Brunei Navy Fleet; Royal Brunei Navy

Othman bin Haji Suhaili @ Suhaily (born 19 April 1970), also referred to as Dato Othman, is a Bruneian military officer who formerly took office as the eleventh commander of the Royal Brunei Navy (RBN) from 2019 to 2020.

== Education ==
Othman had the chance to take a number of courses abroad while serving in the Royal Australian Navy Training Detachment on board HMS Ipswich (FCPB 209), the Republic of Singapore Navy's Midshipman Sea Training Deployment in 1990, the United Kingdom's International Sub-Lieutenant Course in 1991, Malaysia's Ship Diver Course in 1994, the United Kingdom's International Principle Warfare Officer course in 2000, Pakistan's Staff Course and other courses notably Executive Development Programme (EDP) in Public Policy and Management Course in National University of Singapore in 2009 and attended the Malaysian Armed Forces Defence College Course 34/2014 with Masters of Social Science in Malaysia.

== Military career ==
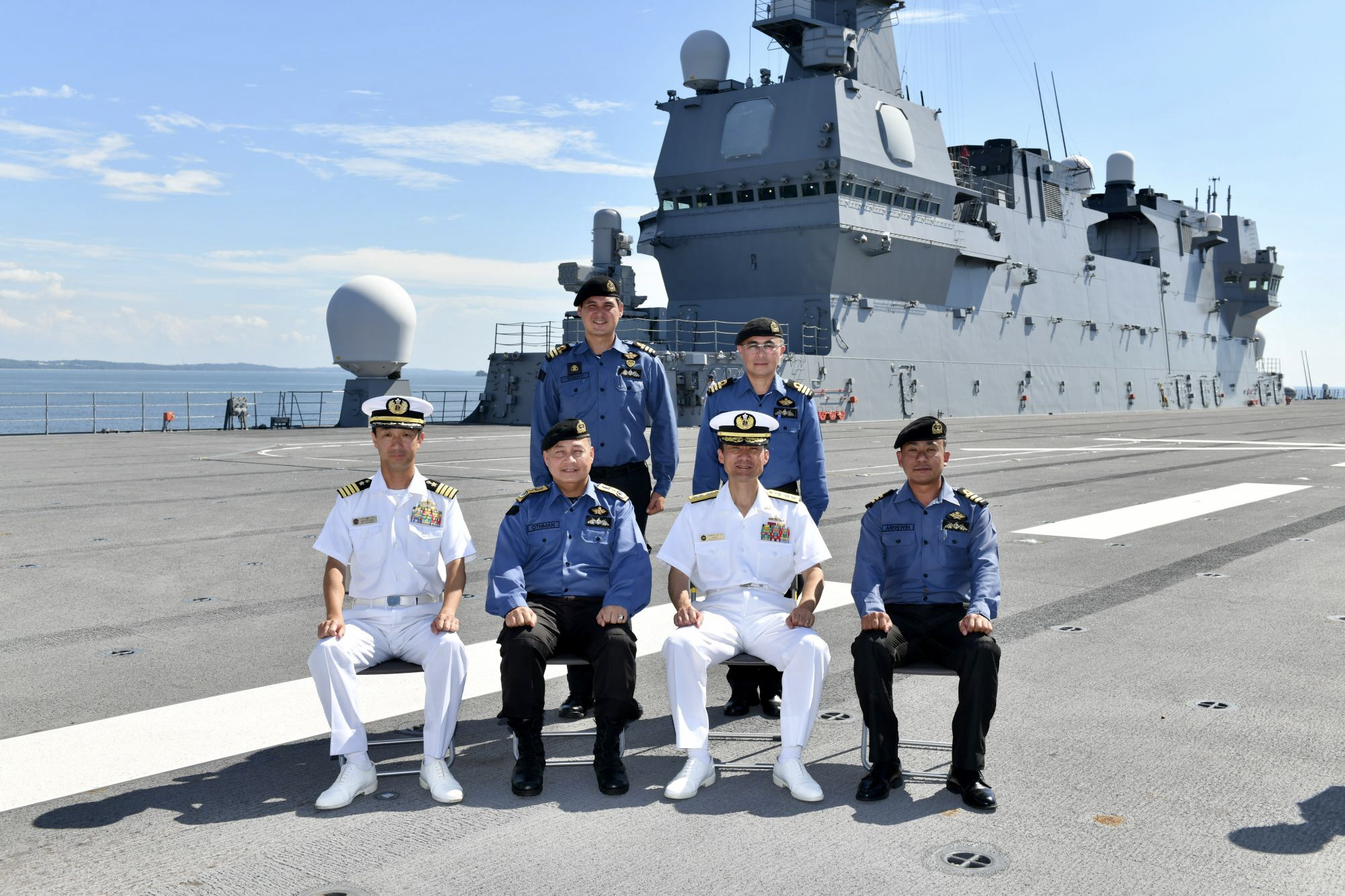
Othman onboard JS Izumo (DDH-183) off Muara Port in 2019

Othman enlisted as a recruit in September 1988, was sent to the RBN as a naval cadet on 17 March 1989, and completed the Britannia Royal Naval College, Dartmouth's International Midshipman Course in 1990. He has held a number of command positions, including KDB Pemburu (P-15), KDB Penyerang (P-16), KDB Perwira (P-14) and KDB Seteria (P-04). Among the other appointments made was diving officer. He was appointed RBN Fleet Commander in 2011. His staff officer positions were Base Commander in 2010, Defence Advisor of Brunei Darussalam to Malaysia from 2012 to 2013, Military Assistant to Commander Royal Brunei Armed Forces (RBAF) from 2007 to 2009, and Head of Capability Development Cell in 2015.

Together with New Zealand, Othman served as co-chairman of the ADMM-Plus Expert Working Group (EWG) on maritime security from 2015 to 2017. In 2016, RBN had the honor of hosting the Field Training Exercise on Maritime Security and Counter Terrorism while he served as chairman. Prior to assuming his present position as commander of RBN on 19 April 2019, he was appointed as the Deputy Commander of RBN on 6 March 2015.

Dato Othman traveled to Russia from 28 to 30 July 2019 to take part in Russian Navy Day festivities and the Main Navy Parade in Saint Petersburg. Admiral Nikolai Yevmenov, the commander-in-chief of the Russian Navy, was visited by Dato Othman. In acknowledgment of his efforts to strengthen ties between the Republic of Singapore Navy (RSN) and RBN, RADM Aaron Beng was also given the RBN Command Badge by Dato Othman during his visit to Brunei from 8 to 10 December 2020. Beng also joined Dato Othman in attending a United States Navy Pacific Fleet virtual leadership engagement program. At the Handover Ceremony Ceremony in Muara Naval Base on 1 January 2021, First Admiral Spry Serudi succeeded Dato Othman as the commander of the RBN, per the directive of Sultan Hassanal Bolkiah.

== Personal life ==
Othman is married to Datin Nazatulshima binti Haji C.A. Mohamed, and together they have four children; 3 sons and 1 daughter. He enjoys jogging, swimming, and reading.

== Honours ==
Othman has earned the following honours;

- Order of Pahlawan Negara Brunei First Class (PSPNB; 15 July 2019) – Dato Seri Pahlawan
- Order of Setia Negara Brunei Fourth Class (PSB; 2008)
- Order of Seri Paduka Mahkota Brunei Third Class (SMB; 2015)
- Sultan of Brunei Silver Jubilee Medal (5 October 1992)
- National Day Silver Jubilee Medal (23 February 2009)
- General Service Medal (Armed Forces)
- Long Service Medal and Good Conduct (PKLPB)
- Royal Brunei Armed Forces Golden Jubilee Medal (31 May 2011)

Military offices
Preceded by Pengiran Norazmi	11th Commander of the Royal Brunei Navy; 19 April 2019 – 31 December 2020	Succeeded by Spry Serudi
