= Commander of the Royal Brunei Armed Forces =

Professional head of the military of Brunei Darussalam

- Pemerintah Angkatan Bersenjata Diraja Brunei
- Flag of the Royal Brunei Armed Forces

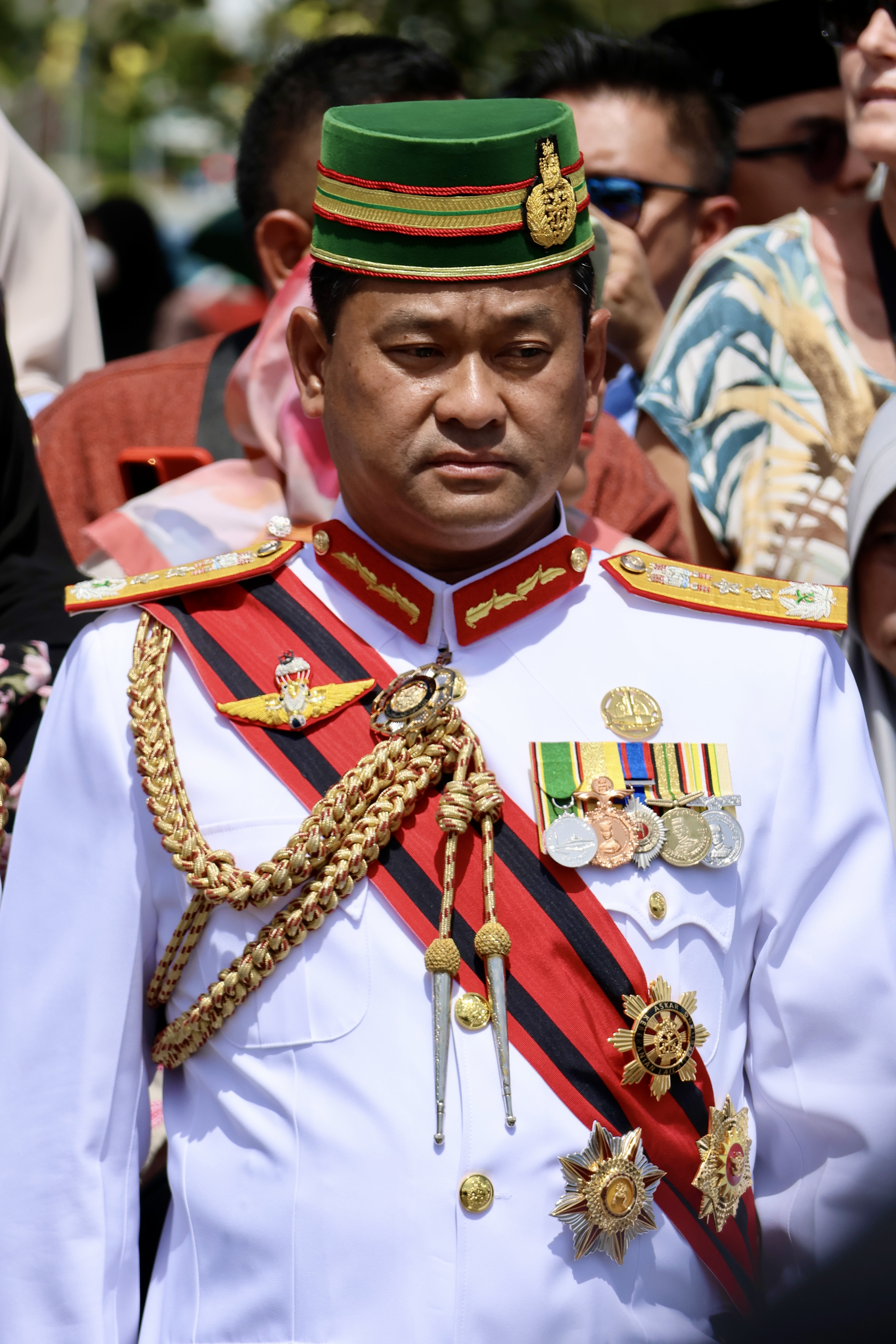
- Incumbent; Major General; Dato Paduka Seri Haszaimi Bol Hassan since 1 March 2022; 4 years ago
- Royal Brunei Armed Forces
- Type: Armed forces commander
- Status: Major general
- Reports to: Minister of Defence
- Seat: Bolkiah Garrison, Bandar Seri Begawan, Brunei BB3510
- Appointer: Sultan of Brunei
- Term length: No fixed length
- Formation: 1 January 1986; 40 years ago
- First holder: Mohammad Daud
- Website: Official website

The Commander of the Royal Brunei Armed Forces (Malay: Pemerintah Angkatan Bersenjata Diraja Brunei) is the professional head of the Royal Brunei Armed Forces (RBAF). He is responsible for the overall management, administration, and the operational control of the entire military of Brunei. The current commander is Major general Dato Paduka Seri Haji Muhammad Haszaimi bin Bol Hassan.

== Early history ==
Lieutenant Colonel Tengku Ahmad bin Tengku Besar Barhanuddin, seconded from the Royal Malay Regiment, served as the first commanding officer of the Brunei Malay Regiment (BMR) from June 1961 to April 1964. He was followed by Lieutenant Colonel Donald Murray Fletcher, who became the first and last British officer commanding the regiment from April 1964 to May 1965 and later the first officer commanding the Royal Brunei Malay Regiment (RBMR) until 25 July 1966. From 25 July 1966 until 1 March 1969, Major Henry Fairbridge Burrows (later Lieutenant Colonel) replaced him as Commander. On 1 March 1969, John Simpson was appointed to lead the RBMR, quickly promoted to Colonel and assumed control of the air and naval wings.

Colonel Bertram Francis Louis Rooney served as commander of the RBMR from 4 December 1971 to 18 July 1975, followed by Colonel Norman Roberts, who held the position from 18 July 1975 until 1982. Brigadier General John Friedberger succeeded Roberts, serving as the last British military commander of Brunei from 1982 until 1 January 1986. As the first local commander, 42-year-old Brigadier General Mohammad Daud ushered in a new era for the Royal Brunei Armed Forces (RBAF).

== Appointees ==
No.	Portrait	Name (birth–death)	Term of office			Ref.
No.	Portrait	Name (birth–death)	Took office	Left office	Time in office	Ref.
Brunei Malay Regiment
1		Lieutenant colonel Tunku Ahmad (1924–1999)	June 1961	April 1964	2 years, 10 months	
2		Lieutenant colonel Donald Murray Fletcher (1922–2010)	April 1964	31 May 1965	1 year, 1 month	
Royal Brunei Malay Regiment
1		Lieutenant colonel Donald Murray Fletcher (1922–2010)	31 May 1965	25 July 1966	1 year, 55 days	
2		Lieutenant colonel Henry Fairbridge Burrows (1923–2015)	25 July 1966	1 March 1969	2 years, 219 days	
3		Colonel; John Simpson (1927–2007)	1 March 1969	4 December 1971	2 years, 278 days	
4		Colonel; Bertram Francis Louis Rooney (1922–2018)	4 December 1971	18 July 1975	3 years, 226 days	
5		Colonel; Norman Roberts (1922–2018)	18 July 1975	1982	6–7 years	
6		Brigadier general John Friedberger (born 1937)	1982	1 January 1986	3–4 years	
Royal Brunei Armed Forces
1		Major general Mohammad Daud (born 1943)	1 January 1986	9 August 1990	4 years, 220 days	
2		Major general Sulaiman Damit (1941–2016)	10 August 1990	29 September 1994	4 years, 50 days	
3		Major general Husin Ahmad (born 1944)	30 September 1994	29 September 1997	2 years, 364 days	
4		Major general Pengiran Abidin	30 September 1997	3 July 1999	1 year, 276 days	
5		Major general Shari Ahmad	31 August 1999	2 April 2001	1 year, 214 days	
6		Major general Jaafar Abdul Aziz	2 April 2001	27 March 2003	1 year, 359 days	
7		Major general Halbi Mohammad Yussof (born 1956)	28 March 2003	31 December 2009	6 years, 278 days	
8		Major general Aminuddin Ihsan (born 1966)	31 December 2009	29 January 2014	4 years, 29 days	
9		Major general Tawih Abdullah (born 1964)	30 January 2014	31 January 2018	4 years, 1 day	
10		Major general Pengiran Aminan	31 January 2018	1 September 2020	2 years, 214 days	
11		Major general Hamzah Sahat	1 September 2020	1 March 2022	1 year, 181 days	
12		Major general Haszaimi Bol Hassan	1 March 2022	Incumbent	4 years, 243 days	
