= Ministry of Defence (Brunei) =

Government ministry of Brunei

Ministry of Defence Brunei Darussalam
- Kementerian Pertahanan
- Ministry of Defence badge

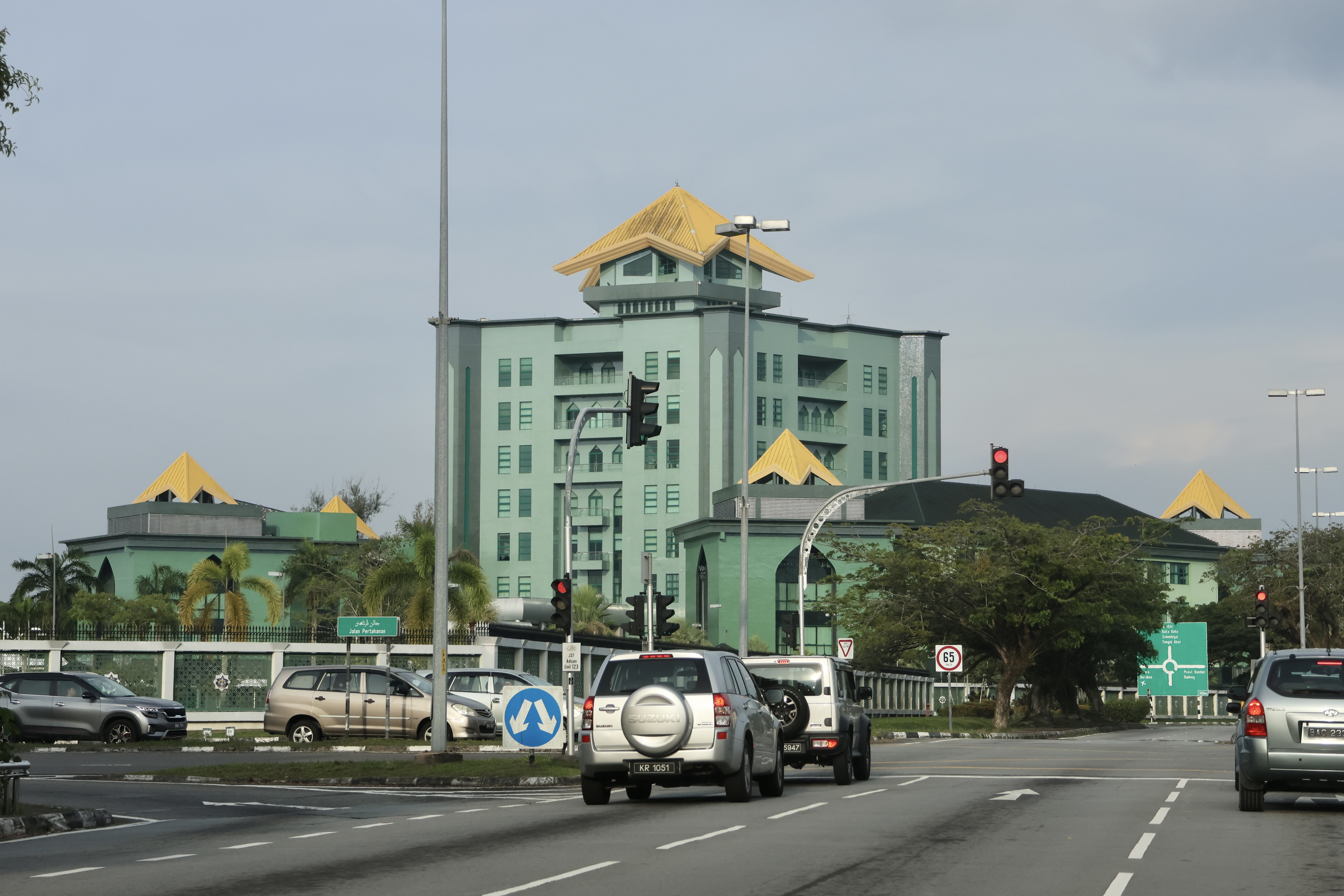
- Ministry of Defence building

Ministry overview
- Formed: 1 January 1984; 41 years ago
- Jurisdiction: Government of Brunei
- Headquarters: Bolkiah Garrison, Bandar Seri Begawan, Brunei-Muara District, BB3510, Brunei Darussalam; 04°55′34″N 114°56′07″E
- Employees: 1,728 (2024)
- Annual budget: $796.3 million BND (2024)
- Ministers responsible: Sultan Hassanal Bolkiah, Minister of Defence; Halbi Mohd Yussof, Minister of Defence II; Alirupendi, Permanent Secretary
- Key document: Defence White Paper 2021
- Website: MinDef.gov.bn

Map
- Location in Brunei

The Ministry of Defence Brunei Darussalam (Malay: Kementerian Pertahanan), officially abbreviated as MinDef, is a cabinet-level ministry of the Government of Brunei. It is responsible for the national security and its military forces within the sultanate of Brunei Darussalam; the latter collectively known as the Royal Brunei Armed Forces (RBAF); Angkatan Bersenjata Diraja Brunei, (ABDB). MinDef is Brunei's ministry of defence; and was established on 1 January 1984; 41 years ago, when Brunei Darussalam achieved independence from the United Kingdom. The Ministry of Defence leadership presently consists of a minister (First Minister); its incumbent is the Sultan of Brunei, Hassanal Bolkiah, who is also the Supreme Commander of the RBAF / ABDB. A deputy minister (Second Minister, officially styled Minister of Defence II) is second-in-command at the Ministry of Defence.

The Ministry of Defence is headquartered within Bolkiah Garrison in Bandar Seri Begawan, the capital of Brunei Darussalam, in the Brunei-Muara District, with the postcode BB3510. In late 1986, the Ministry of Defence was restructured and reorganised; it currently manages the Royal Brunei Armed Forces, the Royal Brunei Malay Reserve Unit, and also the Gurkha Reserve Unit. The ministry is sub-divided into two divisions; Civilian Staff (headed by a Permanent Secretary), and Military Staff (headed by Commander of Royal Brunei Armed Forces).

== Leadership ==
The First Minister of Defence (Menteri Pertahanan) upon the inception of the ministry was Sultan Omar Ali Saifuddien III, who was the late father of the current Sultan, Hassanal Bolkiah, and had been the preceding Sultan of Brunei until his abdication in 1967. Upon the death of Sultan Omar Ali Saifuddien III in 1986, Sultan Hassanal Bolkiah assumed the position, and has remained the First Minister to the present day.

The Second Minister of Defence (Menteri Pertahanan Kedua) portfolio was established in 2018 as a result of a cabinet reshuffle, and was held by Halbi Mohd Yussof. (Note: The official Malay name upon the appointment was Pehin Datu Lailaraja Mejar Jeneral (Bersara) Dato Paduka Seri Haji Awang Halbi bin Haji Mohd. Yussof.)

The Deputy Minister of Defence (Timbalan Menteri Pertahanan) portfolio first appeared in the cabinet assembly in 1986. The position of Deputy Minister of Defence was abolished when the cabinet reshuffle in 2018 established the portfolio of Second Minister of Defence. However, in 2022, there was no longer a Second Minister at the defence ministry, and the portfolio of Deputy Minister of Defence reappeared as a result of cabinet reshuffle. The incumbent was Abdul Razak Abdul Kadir, (Note: The official Malay name upon the appointment was Brigadier Jeneral Dato Seri Pahlawan Awang Haji Abdul Razak bin Haji Abdul Kadir.) who took office from 7 June 2022 until his termination, alongside the abolishment of its office on 27 February 2023. Following the termination, Halbi Mohd Yussof was appointed temporarily as the current Second Minister of Defence, in addition to his present appointment as Minister at the Prime Minister's Office.

== Budget ==
The allocated budget for the fiscal year 2022–23 was 597.67 million Brunei dollar (B$ or BND), an increase of two percent from the previous year. The fiscal year 2024–25 seen a 28% increase in defence spending over the 2023–24 figures, with a record spending of B$796.3 million being announced. (Note: ≈ GB£469 million / €546 million / US$588 million as of May 2024.)

== List of ministers ==
First minister
No.	Portrait	Name (born–died)	Term of office			Ref.
No.	Portrait	Name (born–died)	Took office	Left office	Time in office	Ref.
1		Omar Ali Saifuddien III (1914–1986)	1 January 1984	7 September 1986 †	2 years, 189 days	
2		Hassanal Bolkiah (born 1946)	7 September 1986	Incumbent	39 years, 42 days	

Second minister
No.	Portrait	Name (born–died)	Term of office			Ref.
No.	Portrait	Name (born–died)	Took office	Left office	Time in office	Ref.
1		Halbi Mohammad Yussof (born 1956)	30 January 2018	7 June 2022	4 years, 128 days	
1		Halbi Mohammad Yussof (born 1956)	27 February 2023	Incumbent	2 years, 234 days	

Deputy minister
No.	Portrait	Name (born–died)	Term of office			Ref.
No.	Portrait	Name (born–died)	Took office	Left office	Time in office	Ref.
1		Ibnu Basit Apong (born 1942)	20 October 1986	24 May 2005	18 years, 216 days	
2		Yasmin Umar (born 1956)	24 May 2005	29 May 2010	5 years, 5 days	
3		Mustappa Sirat (born 1957)	29 May 2010	22 October 2015	5 years, 146 days	
4		Abdul Aziz Tamit (born 1966)	22 October 2015	30 January 2018	2 years, 100 days	
5		Abdul Razak (born 1972)	7 June 2022	27 February 2023	265 days	
Abolished
