= Alap-Alap Formation =

Aerobatic display team of Brunei Darussalam

Alap-Alap Formation (Kestrel Formation)
- Active: 2011 to present
- Country: Brunei Darussalam
- Allegiance: Sultan of Brunei
- Branch: Royal Brunei Air Force; Tentera Udara Diraja Brunei
- Type: military formation aerobatic display team
- Size: 3 aircraft, 3 pilots
- Part of: 73 Squadron, No. 7 Wing RBAirF
- Based at: Royal Brunei Air Force Base, Rimba
- Aircraft livery: white, blue, red, yellow
- Aircraft displayed: 3x Pilatus PC-7 Mk.II

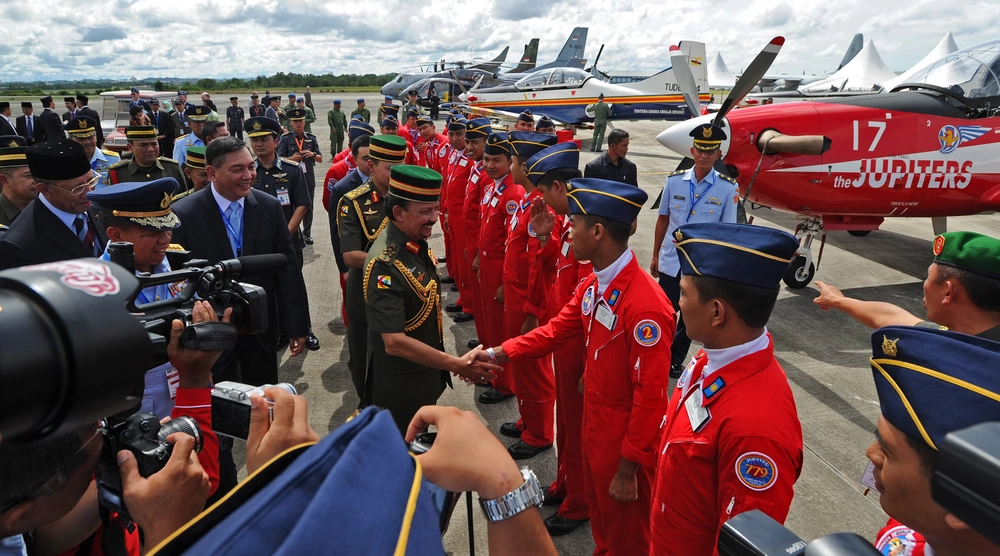
BRIDEX 2013 static display, including one of the Pilatus PC-7 Mk.II (Brunei military registration TUDB 304) as used by the Alap-Alap Formation.

The Alap-Alap Formation (Kestrel Formation) is the official military formation aerobatic display team of Brunei Darussalam, operated by the Royal Brunei Air Force (RBAirF; Malay: Tentera Udara Diraja Brunei – TUDB), part of the Royal Brunei Armed Forces (RBAF / ABDB). The Alap-Alap Formation display team was formed on 7 February 2011; 15 years ago.

== Aircraft ==
The Alap-Alap Formation display team uses three of their four RBAirF / TUDB Pilatus PC-7 Mk.II turboprop trainer aircraft, purchased from Switzerland in 1997, a low-wing tandem-seat full-dual control aircraft powered by a 522 kilowatts (700 shaft horsepower) Pratt & Whitney Canada PT-6A-25C turboprop engine driving a four-blade variable-pitch propeller. All four PC-7 aircraft of the RBAirF are liveried in a white, blue, red, and yellow colour-scheme. The three aircraft used by the Alap-Alap Formation display team (registration numbers and tail codes: TUDB 302 / PB, TUDB 303 / PC, and TUDB 304 / PD) are fitted with two under-wing smoke pods, mounted on external hard-points, which are able to generate white smoke during displays and flypasts.

== Operation ==
Currently the Royal Brunei Air Force have a total of four PC-7 Mk.II aircraft. The aircraft are under the management of No 73 Squadron TUDB (originally known as 63 Squadron ATUDB), a flying squadron of No. 7 Wing RBAirF, part of the Flying Training School (FTS) of the training wing located at the Royal Brunei Air Force Base, Rimba.

== Pilots ==
Identified by their respective 'Eagle' call signs, the display team consists of three pilots. One pilot is local, from the Royal Brunei Air Force, and two remaining pilots are from the British Royal Air Force (RAF), one on loan from the RAF and the other directly contracted to the RBAF. All are Qualified Flying Instructor (QFI) pilots, whilst its team leader achieved the Formation Aerobatic Leader qualification from the Empire Test Pilots' School (ETPS) in the UK.

== Displays ==
Alap-Alap Formation have displayed during the Royal Brunei Armed Forces (RBAF) 50th Anniversary. They are the first team in Brunei Darussalam to carry out formation aerobatics at low level altitudes of 500 feet (150 metres).
