= Shahril =

Shahril is a given name. Notable people with the name include:

- Shahril Alias (born 1984), football player
- Shahril Anwar (died 2021), commander of the Royal Brunei Air Force
- Azi Shahril Azmi (born 1985), Malaysian international footballer
- Shahril Sufian Hamdan (born 1985), Malaysian politician
- Shahril Ishak (born 1984), Singaporean footballer
- Shahril Jantan (born 1980), Singaporean footballer
- Khairul Shahril Mohamed, Malaysian politician
- Shahril Saabah (born 1994), Malaysian field hockey player
- Shahril Sa'ari (born 1990), Malaysian footballer
