= Royal Brunei Air Force =

Aerial warfare branch of Brunei's military

- Malay: Tentera Udara Diraja Brunei; Jawi: تنترا اودارا دراج بروني
- Founded: 1 October 1991 (34 years, 10 months) (in current form) 24 June 1966 (60 years, 2 months) (as the Air Wing)
- Country: Brunei Darussalam
- Type: Air force
- Role: Aerial warfare, air defence, air policing, search and rescue
- Size: 22 manned aircraft, plus 5 UAVs
- Part of: Royal Brunei Armed Forces
- Headquarters: Rimba, Brunei-Muara, Brunei
- Anniversaries: 24 June
- Website: Official website

Commanders
- Commander: Brigadier General (U) Haszahaidi Ahmad Daud
- Deputy commander: Colonel (U) Hismawadi Said
- Chief of Staff: Colonel (U) Mohammad Albadii Shahnoel
- Sergeant major: Warrant Officer 1 (U) Redzaini Ahmad
- Notable commanders: Brigadier General (Rtd) Mahmud Saidin (first Bruneian with fighter pilot's licence)

Insignia
- Fin flash

- Ensign

Aircraft flown
- Multirole helicopter: S-70i, Bell 214ST
- Trainer helicopter: Bell 206
- Reconnaissance: RQ-21
- Trainer: PC-7 Mk.II
- Transport: IPTN CN-235, Airbus C295MW

The Royal Brunei Air Force (RBAirF), natively known as the Tentera Udara Diraja Brunei (TUDB), is the air force of the sultanate of Brunei. It is headquartered and mainly based at the Royal Brunei Air Force Base, Rimba, opposite the Brunei International Airport (BIA). Its role is to defend the national airspace and to provide air policing and surveillance of its land and maritime borders. As of 2024, it operates twenty-two manned aircraft and five unmanned aerial vehicles (UAV).

The RBAirF was formed as an independent air force on 1 October 1991. It was originally created in 1965 as the Air Wing of the Royal Brunei Malay Regiment (Askar Melayu Diraja Brunei; AMDB), the forerunner of today's Royal Brunei Armed Forces (RBAF). The Air Wing had operated helicopters (the Bell 205) since 1966. The annual anniversary ceremony of RBAirF's inception was place on 24 June every year.

== History ==
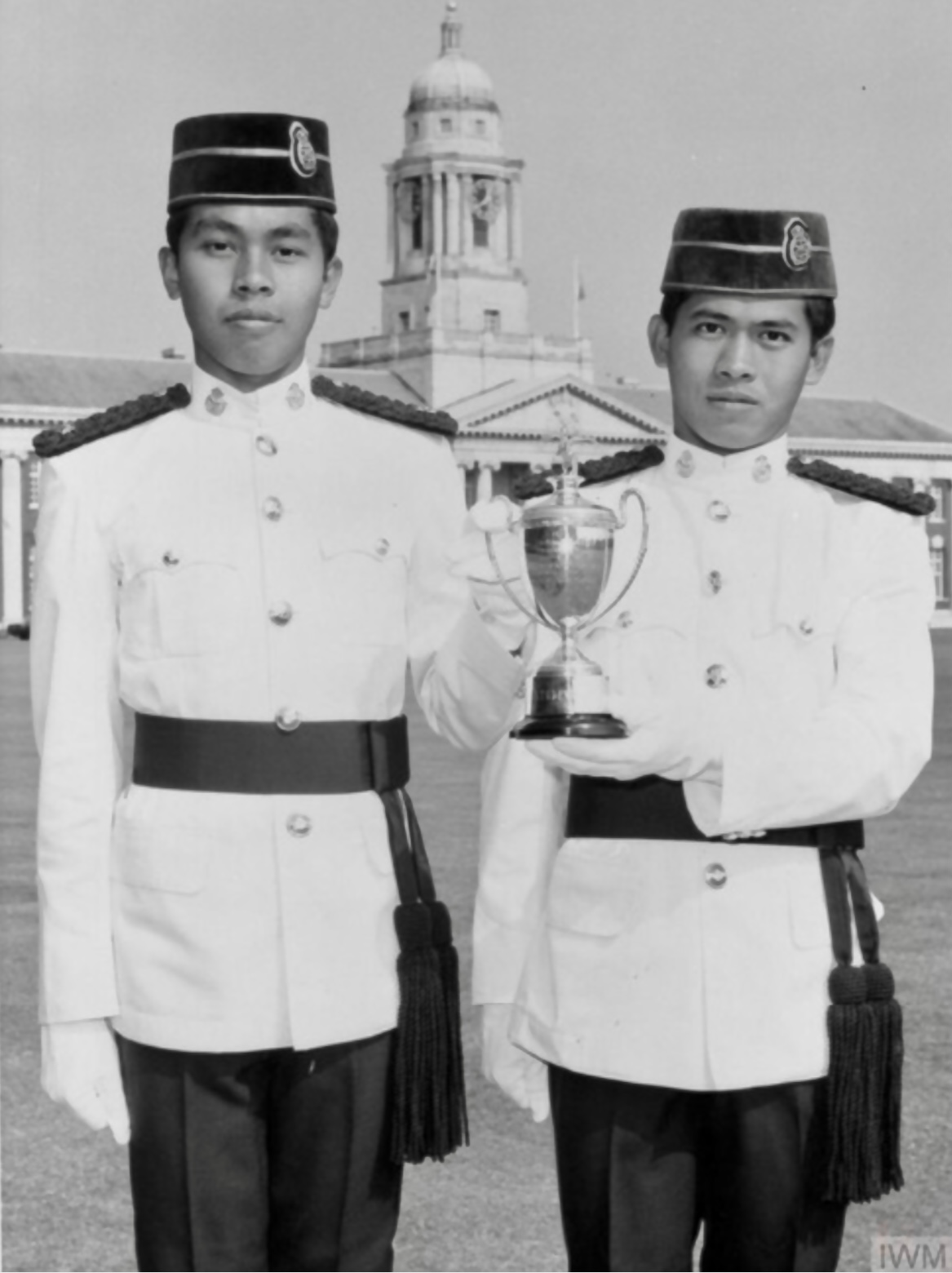
Brunei helicopter trainees with their Overseas Student Prize trophy at the Royal Air Force College Cranwell, 1975.

The Royal Brunei Air Force was established as the Air Wing of the Royal Brunei Malay Regiment (RBMR) in 1965. It was first tasked to fly doctors to rural area with two Sikorsky S-55 aircraft, which was operated by pilots from the Worldwide Helicopter Company. In 1966, the tasks were taken over by three British pilots from the Royal Air Force (RAF) operating three RAF Westland Whirlwind helicopters.

In 1967, the unit was renamed as the Helicopter Platoon, and received five Bell 206 Jet Ranger helicopters. The Air Technical Training School was established in 1980. In 1981, No. 2 Squadron was established and equipped with six Bölkow BO105 helicopters.

No. 3 Squadron was established in 1982 and equipped with SIAI-Marchetti SF260s. On 1 September 1983, the No. 2 Wing was founded at what was previously the Air Defence Battery. When Brunei assumed responsibility for its own defence from the United Kingdom in 1984, the Air Wing was expanded. On 1 October 1991, with the consent of The Sultan, the Air Wing was officially renamed the Royal Brunei Air Force. The Air Defence Battery was transferred to the Royal Brunei Air Force on 24 March 1995, and given the new name Air Defence Squadron.

No. 4 Squadron was established in 1997, and was equipped with the Blackhawk S-70A helicopters. No. 5 Squadron was also established in 1997, and was equipped with a CN-235 fixed-wing aeroplane and the Base Defence Squadron. In the same year, 3 Squadron received the Pilatus PC-7 Mk.II training aircraft. No. 38 Squadron was established in 1999, and is equipped with the Mistral surface-to-air missile, following acquisition of its Mistral System. In the same year, Airfield Ground Defence was transferred from the RBAirF's Administration Wing to the Air Regiment.

A brand-new wing called No. 3 Wing was inaugurated on 27 July 2016. In 2019, the RBAirF unveiled the Digital Disruptive Pattern BDU in digital grey colours at the 58th anniversary celebration at the Bolkiah Garrison. As of 28 August 2020, the commander of the Royal Brunei Air Force is Brigadier General (U) Dato Seri Pahlawan Mohd Sharif bin Dato Paduka Haji Ibrahim.

Following an order made in 2020, the RBAirF acquired five Boeing Insitu RQ-21 Blackjack unmanned aerial vehicles (UAV) from the United States in 2021. They will be used for intelligence, surveillance and reconnaissance (ISR) around Brunei's territorial waters in the South China Sea. The first was unveiled by the Sultan of Brunei, Hassanal Bolkiah, an event held in June 2021 to mark the 60th anniversary of the Royal Brunei Armed Forces.

A parade was held at the Air Movement Centre (AMC) in celebration of the 55th anniversary on 25 June 2021. Of note was the introduction of Integrator into the RBAirF, a drone unmanned aerial system (UAS). In collaboration with the Philippine Air Force (PAF) on 3 December 2021, pilots from the Philippines will carry out their training with the S-70i Blackhawk flight simulator at the Canadian Aviation Electronics (CAE) Brunei Multi-Purpose Training Centre (BMPTC).

The decommissioning ceremony of the RBAirF's Bölkow BO105 fleet was held at the AMC within the Air Force Base, Rimba, on 5 February 2022. First introduced as a fleet of six helicopters into No. 2 Squadron, Air Wing in 1981, administered and maintained by the Royal Electrical and Mechanical Engineers (REME) from the UK until 1993, this ended 41 years' service of the type as latterly operated by No. 1 Wing, Operations Group.

== Organisation ==
The Royal Brunei Air Force is divided into seven (7) Wings:

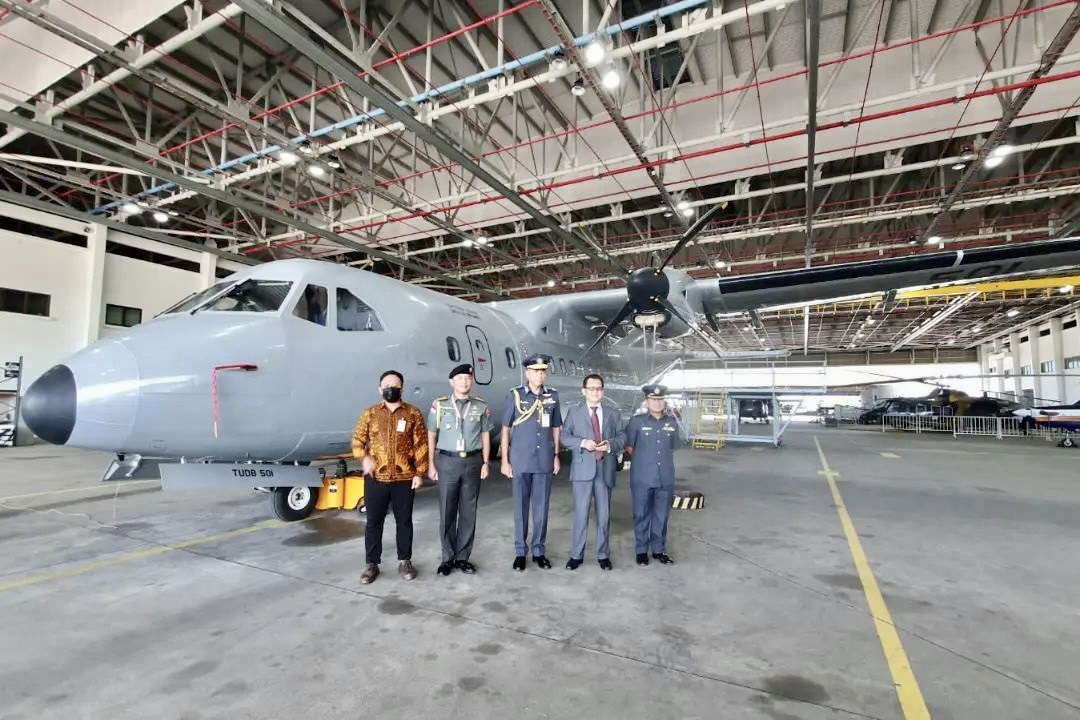
No.15 Squadron's CN-235 at Rimba Air Base.

The Operation Wing consists of four flying wings and three addition units:

- No. 1 Wing consisted of four flying squadrons in it. Each squadron has unique operating requirements for their respective functions with the capability to conduct maritime and border patrol.
  - No. 11 Squadron (formerly No. 1) is equipped with Bell 214ST helicopters. 1 Sqn previously operated the Bell 212 until their retirement in 2013. The primary roles of 11 Squadron are for troop lift, casualty evacuation, medical evacuation, fire suppression, VVIP lift, and search and rescue.
  - No. 12 Squadron (formerly No. 2) was previously equipped with Bölkow BO105 helicopters. The primary roles of 12 Squadron are to provide flying doctor, reconnaissance, surveillance, close air support, VVIP lift, and search and locate services.
  - No. 14 Squadron (formerly No. 4) is equipped with Blackhawk S-70i helicopters. The primary roles of 14 Squadron are special combat squadron operation task, troop lift, casualty evacuation, medical evacuation, fire fighting, VVIP lift, and search and rescue.
  - No. 15 Squadron (formerly No. 5) is equipped with a C295 aircraft. The primary roles of 15 Squadron are to provide troop-lift, surveillance, and search and locate capabilities.
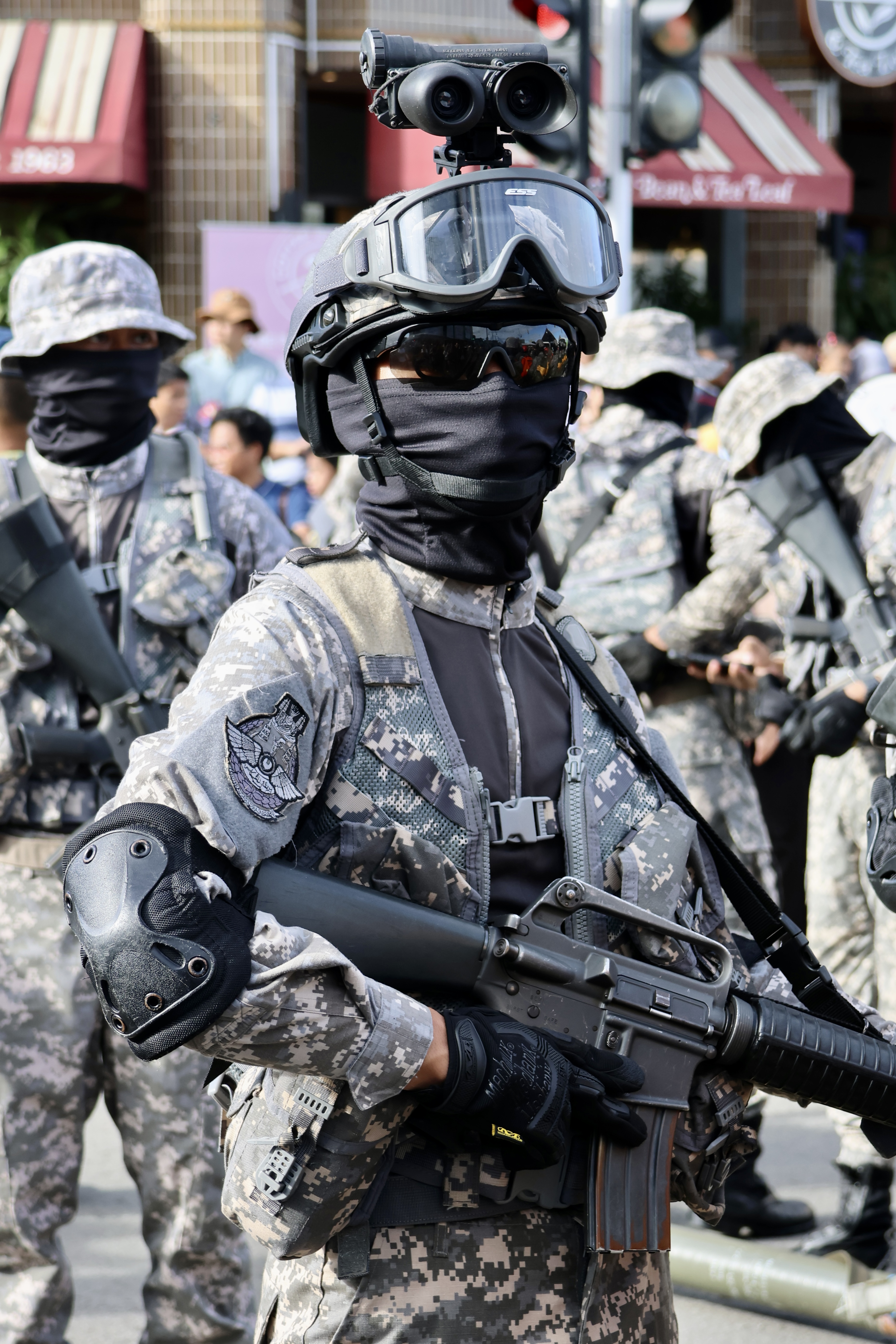
- Soldier from the No. 236 Squadron in full combat dress.
  No. 2 Wing, formerly known as Air Regiment, is responsible for protecting the Royal Brunei Air Force Base and Brunei's airspace against aerial threats.
  - No. 233 Squadron (formerly No. 33 and Air Battery) is equipped with the Rapier FSB1 missile launcher. Its first base of operations was Penanjong Garrison, where Rapier FSB1, a short-range air defense system, was operated. However, in 2010, the system was turned off. In addition to preparation for its new Air Defence System, the squadron became a supporting unit for No. 238 Squadron.
  - No. 236 Squadron (formerly Base Defence Squadron) is responsible for the protection of the Royal Brunei Air Force Base and any Forward Operating Base.
  - No. 238 Squadron (formerly No. 38) is equipped with the VSHORAD (Very Short Range Air Defence System) Mistral missile launcher, based in Berakas Garrison.
  - The Engineering Squadron is situated in Berakas Garison. Via maintenance, the squadron assists in guaranteeing the Air Defence Squadron's operational preparedness.
- No. 3 Wing is tasked in helping with the operational group to carry out its duties and fulfill its mission.
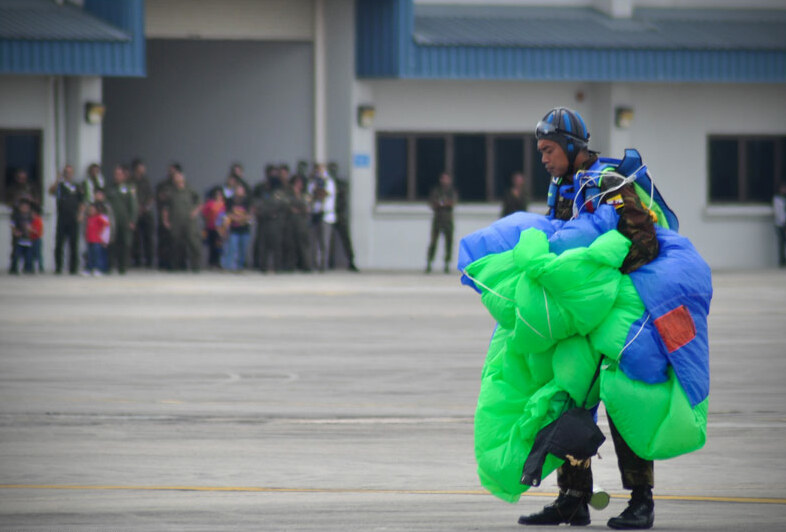
  PATDU during the RBAirF Anniversary 2009.
  - The Parachute Airborne Tactical Delivery Unit (PATDU) provides jungle rescue team, jungle line resupply, multi rope abseil. PATDU are also involved in parachute competitions at the regional and international level.
  - The Fire Brigade Unit (formerly Fire Unit) provides fire and rescue cover of any aircraft during an emergency.
  - The Air Movement Flight supervises all aircraft entering and leaving the RBAirF base, with an addition in dealing with cargo.
  - The Air Space Control assist the Department of Civil Aviation (DCA) in controlling airplanes that fly over our area. Its goal is to find competent Air Traffic Controllers (ATCs).
- No. 4 Wing, also known as the Supply Headquarter, is under the control of the Support Group Commander.
  - Domestic Supply Squadron (DSS) is tasked with providing logistical support and equipment for the personnel.
  - Supply Control and Accounting Flight (SCAF) is made up of five key cells which are the Control Accounting Cell (CAC), the Supply Accounting Cell (SAC), the Supply Control Cell (SCC), Receipt and Despatch (R&D), and the Bulk Fuel Installation Account.
  - Technical Supply Squadron (TSS), formerly known as Technical Supply Flight, is in charge of providing technical assistance to the RBAirF, which keeps its spare parts in the Forward Stores and the Air Force Main Store. The No. 4 Wing Main Building houses the Mainstore, and the Forward Stores, which are currently operational, and are housed within Hangar A, Hangar B, and No. 38 Squadron.
  - Bulk Fuel Installation
- No. 5 Wing, also known as Maintenance Wing, is to make sure that all operating and training requirements are satisfied, as well as to adhere to maintenance deadlines and handle all issues pertaining to aircraft maintenance with extreme care. The S70i Black Hawk, Bo-105, Bell 206 Jet Ranger, S70a Black Hawk, and CN235 are among the aircraft that the engineering squadrons 51, 52, 53, 54, and 55 Squadron are directly in charge of maintaining. This covers the engine, avionics, and airframe of the airplane, among other components.
  - Standard Engineering Cell provide all of the reference material that No. 5 Wing's squadrons and departments.
  - Engineering Control & Planning (EC & P) makes sure that every maintenance activity is correctly documented and updated as necessary.
  - Maintenance Planning Resources Management (MPRM) anticipates all maintenance-related operations and resources.
  - Technical Equipment Maintenance Department (TEMD) is a civilian branch tasked with providing maintenance for the aircraft.
  - No. 51 Squadron
  - No. 52 Squadron
  - No. 53 Squadron
  - No. 54 Squadron
  - No. 55 Squadron
  - Engineering Support Flight provides additional assistance to the squadrons. Ground Support Equipment (GSE) personnel are in charge of providing all necessary equipment for maintenance tasks, Flight Line Mechanics (FLM) personnel are in charge of moving the aircraft on the hangar floor or outside at the apron, and Survival Equipment Section (SES) personnel are in charge of all maintenance and survival equipment provision inside the aircraft.
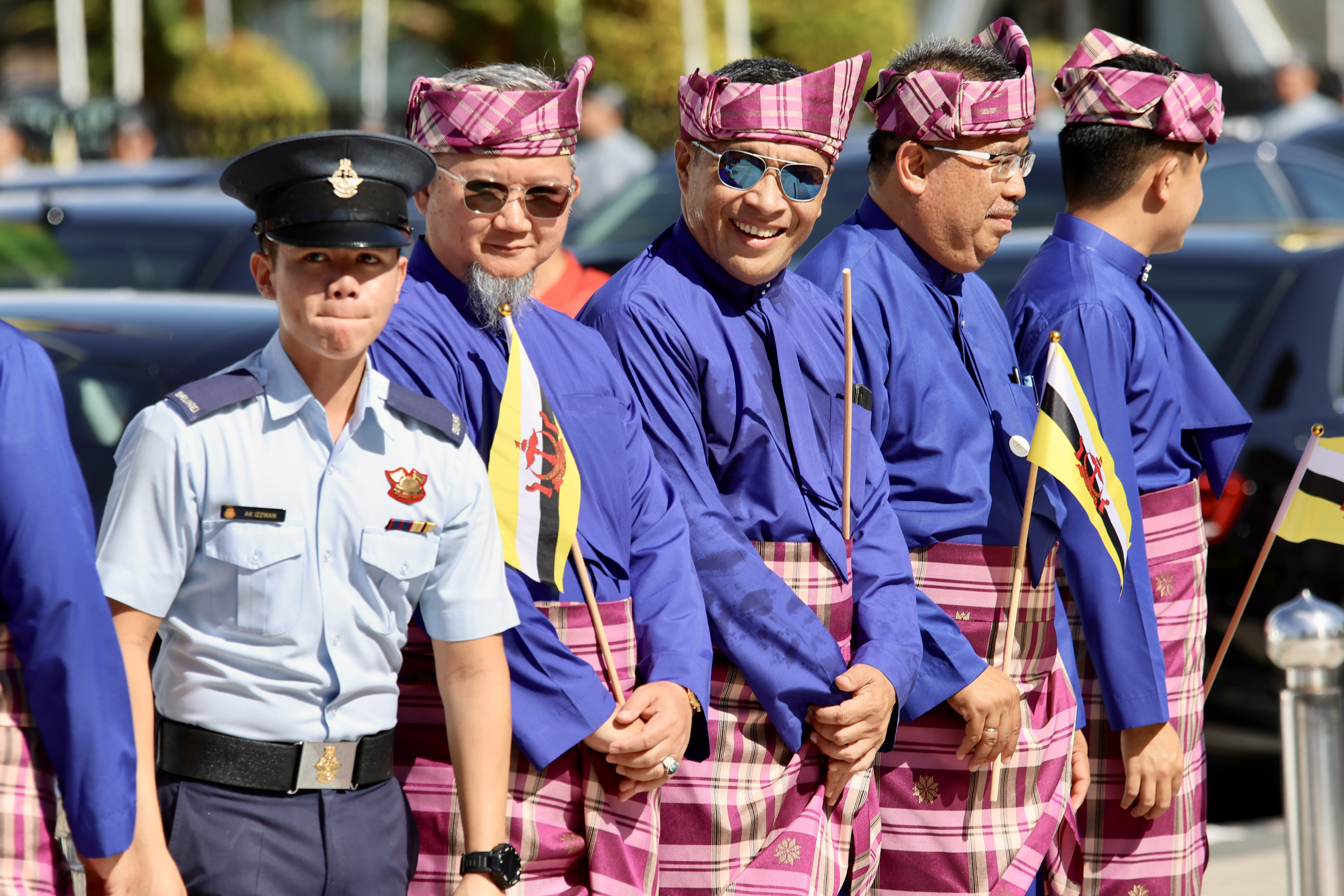
- A member of the RBAirF's Fire Brigade Unit (first from the left).
  No. 6 Wing, formerly known as Administration Wing, is tasked with overseeing personnel welfare as well as administrative concerns and base upkeep related to RBAirF activities.
  - Regimental Police Fleet (RP Flt) is tasked to prevent unauthorized entry to any restricted areas.
  - Pay Fleet safeguard the welfare of all RBAirF personnel, proper procedures for receiving their individual pay and benefits in accordance with the pay manual and financial regulations were followed.
  - Base Maintenance (Base Maint) make sure that all Base requirements from all units are met in accordance with Base procedures.
  - Estate Maintenance Service (EMS) is tasked to do repairs on equipment at Rimba Airbase.
  - Medical Reception Service (MRS) is tasked to provide RBAirF personnel with medical facilities.
  - Light Aid Detachment (LAD) is tasked to maintain the RBAirF's motor transport equipment in working order.
  - Military Transport Fleet (Mt Flt) is tasked to give the RBAirF military land mobility.
  - Dental offer RBAirF members with dental treatment services.
- No. 7 Wing, formerly known as Training Wing, is in charge of managing its staff's administration and wellbeing. The wing also houses a facility for leadership training to meet the requirements of the RBAirF.
  - No. 73 Squadron, also known as Flying Training School (FTS) and formerly No. 3 and No. 63 Squadron, is tasked to give aspiring pilots basic training in both fixed and rotary wings. In addition to training pilots for the RBAirF, it also train crew members. All things considered, the squadron marks the start of a pilot and crewman's career. It is equipped with Bell 206 Jet Ranger helicopters and Pilatus PC-7 Mk.II aircraft.
  - No 75 Squadron, also known as Air Technical Training School (ATTS), to offer fundamental and advanced technical training to all RBAirF technicians in order to create skilled, energetic technicians who can meet operational needs and help the air force realize its aim of being the Center of Excellence in Air Technical Training.
  - No. 77 Squadron is based at Berakas Garrison, and it instructs members of the RBAirF and the No. 2 Wing in air defense.
  - Physical Training Instructor

== Equipment ==
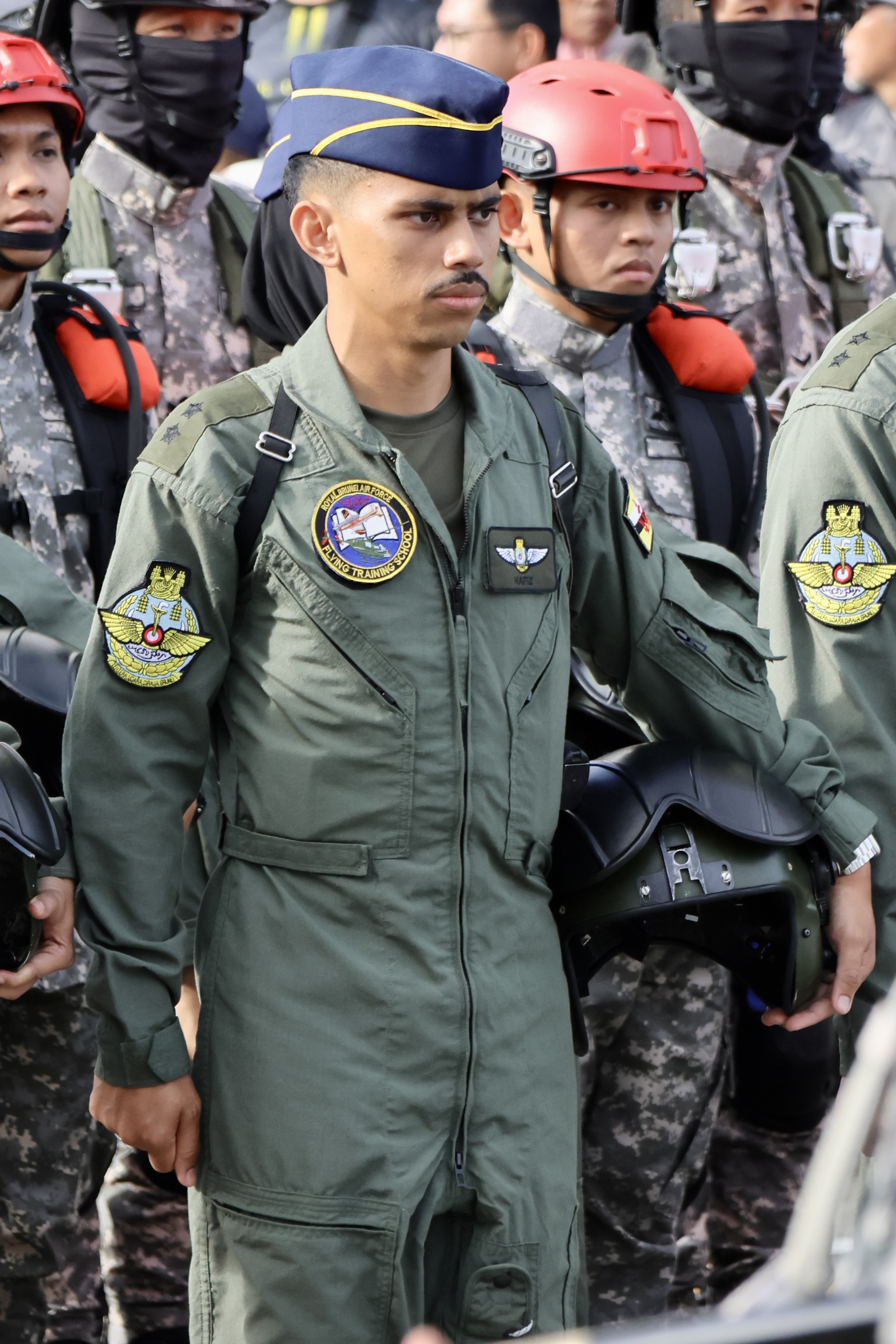
A lieutenant of the Royal Brunei Air Force during the 2023 National Day

In 2015, the Commander of the Air Force, Brigadier General Wardi Abdul Latip, stated that the Air force was actively working with Lockheed Martin to purchase a C-130J Super Hercules, with delivery expected in 2018. As of 2024, this plan is yet to materialize. In January 2015, the RBAirF transferred four of its S-70A Black Hawk’s to the Royal Malaysian Air Force. In 2014, eight Bell 212 helicopters were retired and decommissioned from service.

During Royal Brunei Armed Forces diamond jubilee celebration in 2021, an unmanned aerial system (UAS) programme was launched by the Sultan of Brunei, and a RQ-21 Blackjack model was unveiled by a US company, Insitu to the Sultan. This UAS will be used for maritime security surveillance role. The newly acquired M134D Minigun will be expected to be integrated into the RBAirF later in 2022.

Armaments for the aircraft consist of M134 Minigun's, FZ rockets and unguided air-to-surface SURA rockets. There have been plans to secure fighter capability by purchasing several BAE Hawk aircraft, but these plans have been delayed on several occasions. In November 2011, the White House announced that a deal has been secured by Sikorsky to sell 12 UH-60Ms to the Royal Brunei Air Force.

=== Aircraft ===
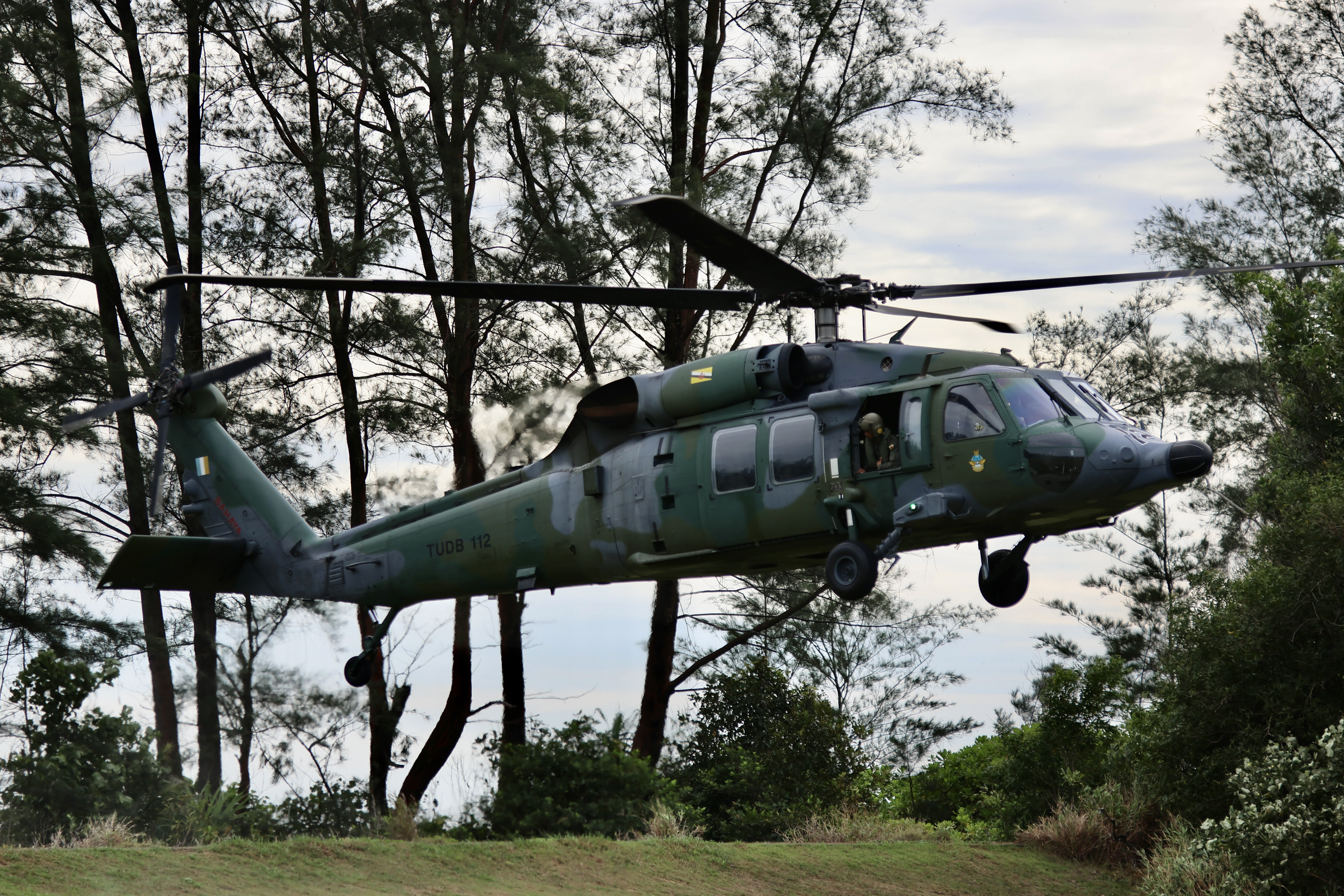
Sikorsky S-70i preparing to land in Kuala Belait, 2023

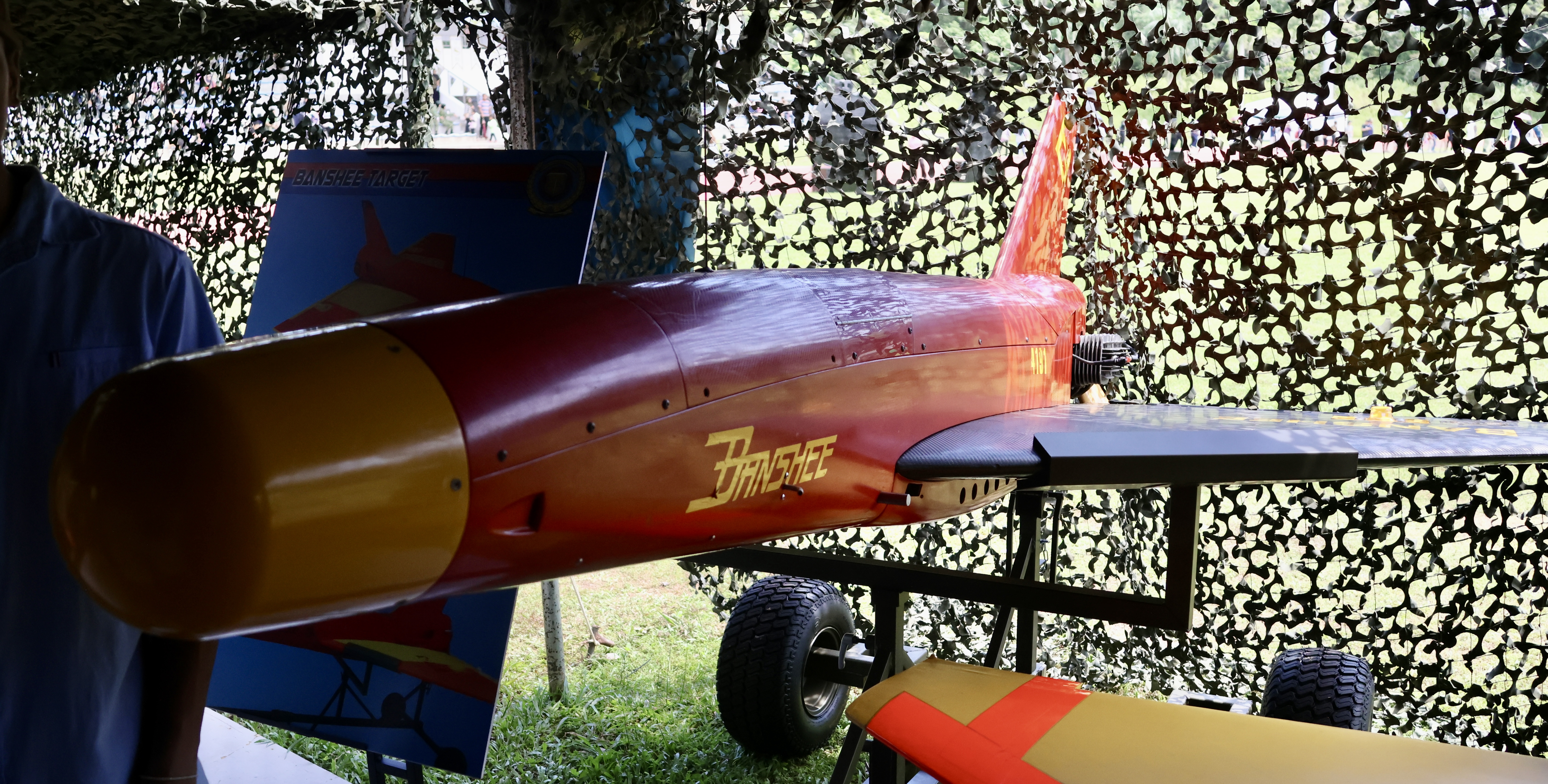
Meggitt Banshee on display in 2024

| Aircraft | Origin | Type | Variant | In service | Notes |
Transport
| CASA/IPTN CN-235 | Indonesia | Transport | | 1 | |
| Airbus C295 | Spain | Transport | C295MW | 4 | |
Helicopters
| Bell 214ST | United States | Utility | | 1 | |
| Airbus H145 | Germany | Multirole | H145M | | 6 on order |
| Sikorsky UH-60 | United States / Poland | Transport / Utility | S-70i | 16 | Produced in Poland |
Trainer aircraft
| Pilatus PC-7 | Switzerland | Trainer | PC-7 Mk II | 4 | |
| Bell 206 | United States | Rotorcraft trainer | | 2 | |
UAV
| Meggitt Banshee | United Kingdom | Target drone | | Unknown | |
| RQ-21 Blackjack | United States | ISTAR | | 5 | |

=== Retired ===
Previous aircraft operated were the Hawker Siddeley HS 748, Bell 212, Sikorsky S-55, MBB Bo 105, SIAI-Marchetti SF.260, Piper PA-28 Cherokee, Westland Wessex, and the Westland Whirlwind.

=== Radar ===
The No. 2 Wing operate the P-STAR ground-based radar which provides a picture of the controlled airspace over Brunei

=== Incidents ===
A Bell 212 operated by the RBAirF crashed in Kuala Belait on 20 July 2012 with the loss of 12 of the 14 crew on board. The cause of the accident has yet to be ascertained. The crash is the worst aviation incident in the history of Brunei.

== Commander ==
| No. | Portrait | Name (born–died) | Term of office | | | Ref. |
| No. | Portrait | Name (born–died) | Took office | Left office | Time in office | Ref. |
Air Wing, Royal Brunei Malay Regiment
| 1 | | Wing commander John Cheshire (born 1942) | 1980 | 1982 | 1–2 years | |
| 2 | | Lieutenant colonel Pengiran Abidin | 1982 | 27 March 1986 | 3–4 years | |
| 3 | | Lieutenant colonel Jocklin Kongpaw | 27 March 1986 | 1990 | 3–4 years | |
Royal Brunei Air Force
| 1 | | Lieutenant colonel Ibrahim Mohammed | 1991 | 1993 | 1–2 years | |
| 2 | | Major general Pengiran Abidin | June 1993 | 1997 | 3–4 years | |
| 3 | | Brigadier general Ibrahim Mohammed | 1997 | 2000 | 2–3 years | |
| 12 | | Brigadier general Mahmud Saidin | 2000 | 2009 | 8–9 years | |
| 13 | | Brigadier general Jofri Abdullah | 21 August 2009 | 7 December 2012 | 3 years, 108 days | |
| 14 | | Brigadier general Wardi Abdul Latip | 7 December 2012 | 25 September 2015 | 2 years, 292 days | |
| 13 | | Brigadier general Shahril Anwar (?–2021) | 26 September 2015 | 18 August 2018 | 2 years, 326 days | |
| 14 | | Major general Hamzah Sahat | 18 August 2018 | 28 August 2020 | 2 years, 10 days | |
| 15 | | Brigadier general Sharif Ibrahim | 28 August 2020 | 10 January 2025 | 4 years, 135 days | |
| 16 | | Brigadier general Haszahaidi Ahmad Daud | 10 January 2025 | Incumbent | 1 year, 228 days | |

== Rank structure ==
=== Commissioned officers ===
The rank insignia for commissioned officers for the Royal Brunei Air Force.

| Rank group | General / flag officers | | | | | Senior officers | | | Junior officers |
|---|---|---|---|---|---|---|---|---|---|---|---|
| Royal Brunei Air Force |
| Royal Brunei Air Force | Marsyal udara | Jeneral (udara) | Leftenan jeneral (udara) | Mejar jeneral (udara) | Brigedier jeneral (udara) | Kolonel (udara) | Leftenan kolonel (udara) | Mejar (udara) | Kapten (udara) | Leftenan (udara) | Leftenan muda (udara) |

=== Enlisted ===
Unlike most Commonwealth armed forces, Brunei has maintained 4 warrant officer ranks, used in conjunction with the standard Commonwealth NCO and enlisted personnel and ratings ranks. The following are the rank insignia for enlisted personnel for the Royal Brunei Air Force.

| Rank group | Senior NCOs | | | | Junior NCOs | | Enlisted |
|---|---|---|---|---|---|---|---|
| Royal Brunei Air Force | | | | | | | No insignia |
| Royal Brunei Air Force | Pegawai waran 1 (udara) | Pegawai waran 2 (udara) | Staf sarjan (udara) | Sarjan (udara) | Koperal (udara) | Lans koperal (udara) | Prebet/Soldadu (udara) |

== See also ==
- Royal Brunei Armed Forces
- Royal Brunei Navy
- Royal Brunei Land Force
- Alap-Alap Formation
- Parachute Airborne Tactical Delivery Unit
- Air Force Special Forces
