= Shahril Anwar =

13th Commander of the Royal Brunei Air Force

Brigadier General (Retired) Dato Seri Pahlawan Shahril Anwar PSPNB SMB PSB
- شهر الأنوار معاوية
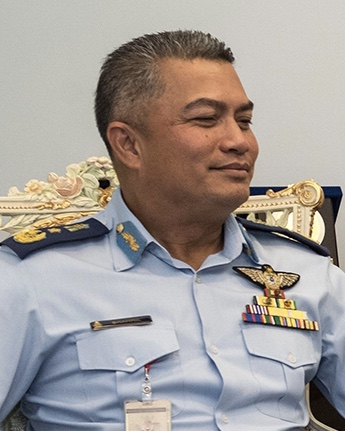
- Brigadier General Shahril Anwar in 2017

6th Commander of the Royal Brunei Air Force
- In office 26 September 2015 – 18 August 2018
- Monarch: Hassanal Bolkiah
- Deputy: Hamsani Abdul Hamid
- Preceded by: Wardi Abdul Latip
- Succeeded by: Hamzah Sahat

Personal details
- Born: Brunei
- Died: 19 November 2021
- Resting place: Kianggeh Muslim Cemetery, Bandar Seri Begawan, Brunei
- Spouse: Noraidah Ibrahim
- Occupation: Military officer

Military service
- Allegiance: Brunei
- Branch/service: Royal Brunei Air Force
- Years of service: 1986–2018
- Rank: Brigadier General
- Unit: No. 1 Squadron (Bell 212); No. 4 Squadron (S70i); Training Wing (PC-7 Mk.II)
- Commands: Royal Brunei Air Force

Shahril Anwar bin Haji Ma'awiah (died 19 November 2021) was a Bruneian military officer who was the commander of the Royal Brunei Air Force (RBAirF) from 2015 to 2018 and thereafter Permanent Secretary at the Ministry of Defence. Prior to this, he was also the defence attaché of Brunei to Malaysia in 2010.

== Military education ==
Throughout his military career, he attended several institutes and training overseas, including the Initial Officer Training (IOT) at the Royal Air Force College Cranwell (RAFC Cranwell), Lincolnshire, England in October 1986, the Qualified Helicopter Instructor (QHI) course in the United Kingdom (UK) in 1999, the 4th Advanced Command and Staff Course (ACSC) at the Joint Services Command and Staff College (JSCSC), United Kingdom in July 2000, the Australia's Centre of Defence and Strategic Studies (ADDSS) at the Australian Defence College, Canberra, Australia in 2012.

== Military career ==
In January 1986, he enlisted into the Royal Brunei Armed Forces (RBAF), and was subsequently commissioned into the Royal Brunei Air Force (RBAirF), joining No. 1 Squadron, Operations Wing (present day No. 11 Squadron, No. 1 Wing). He would then be assigned to the No. 4 Squadron (present day No. 14 Squadron, No. 1 Wing) as the Flight Operations Commander. Upon returning from the United Kingdom, Colonel Shahril became the Squadron Commander of the No. 4 Squadron in August 2001. In 2006, Shahril became the commanding officer (CO) of the Training Wing in the RBAirF, having previously held the position of Staff Officer Grade 2 (SO2).

Returning from Australia in December 2012, the Colonel was assigned to the Directorate of Force Capability Development as their director, and later became the RBAirF's deputy commander on 18 December 2014, under the command of Wardi Abdul Latip. Finally on 25 September 2015, the handover ceremony of the command of RBAirF between Wardi Abdul Latip and Shahril Anwar was held at Royal Brunei Air Force Base, Rimba, near Bandar Seri Begawan. His newly appointed position would only be effective on the following day, and become the thirteenth commander of the branch. The ceremony was attended by service and family members followed by defence advisers of several other countries.

On 9 January 2016, Commander Shahril noted that the RBAirF was lacking in manpower, and required more people to enlist to replace retired or overworked servicemen. He persuaded both men and women to enlist, and announced that flight simulators for the Sikorsky Blackhawk S70i and Pilatus PC-7 Mk.II are expected to arrive in Brunei later that year. Shahril Anwar with the consent of Sultan Hassanal Bolkiah, was promoted to the rank of Brigadier General on 27 May 2016. Commander Shahril handed over the national flag of Brunei to Major Amierul Helpi Talip, CO of No. 238 Squadron, No. 2 Wing, prior to their departure to take part in the 23rd Exercise Airguard from 28 August to 11 September 2017. On 18 August 2018, he would then be succeeded by Hamzah Sahat as the fourteenth commander.

== Later life and death ==
At a request by Sultan Hassanal Bolkiah, Dato Shahril became the permanent secretary of the Ministry of Defence on 10 August 2018. From 2 to 5 April 2019, he represented Brunei during both the ASEAN Defence Senior Officials' Meeting (ADSOM) and ADSOM-Plus. During the 8th Singapore-Brunei Defence Policy Dialogue (DPD) on 15 September 2020, Shahril co-chaired the meeting through video conference. Permanent Secretary Shahril attended the 10th Meeting of the Deputy Ministers of Defense of the Republic of Korea (ROK)–ASEAN and the Seoul Defence Dialogue (SDD) on 8 September 2021.

Dato Shahril died on Friday, 19 November 2021 and left a widow and 2 children. He is laid to rest a Kianggeh Muslim Cemetery.

== Personal life ==
Dato Shahril is married to Noraidah binti Haji Ibrahim, the couple have two children. In addition, he enjoys golf, running and cycling. He attended a MS ABDB association football match during the 2016 Brunei Super League.

== Honours ==
=== Things named after him ===
- Shahril Anwar Loop, road name within Royal Brunei Air Force Base, Rimba, officiated on 22 April 2022.

=== National ===
- Order of Pahlawan Negara Brunei First Class (PSPNB; 15 July 2016) – Dato Seri Pahlawan
- Order of Setia Negara Brunei Fourth Class (PSB)
- Order of Seri Paduka Mahkota Brunei Third Class (SMB; 19 August 2017)
- Long Service Medal and Good Conduct (PKLPB)
- Sultan of Brunei Golden Jubilee Medal (5 October 2017)
- Sultan of Brunei Silver Jubilee Medal (5 October 1992)
- General Service Medal (Armed Forces)
- Royal Brunei Armed Forces Golden Jubilee Medal (31 May 2011)

=== Foreign ===
- Singapore:
  - Pingat Jasa Gemilang (Tentera) (PJG; 27 July 2017)
  - RSAF Honorary Wings (6 May 2016)

Military offices
Preceded by Wardi Abdul Latip	6th Commander of the Royal Brunei Air Force; 26 September 2015 – 18 August 2018	Succeeded by Hamzah Sahat
