= Wardi Abdul Latip =

Bruneian military officer

Brigadier General (Retired) Dato Seri Pahlawan Wardi Abdul Latip PSPNB SMB PSB
- وردي عبد اللطيف
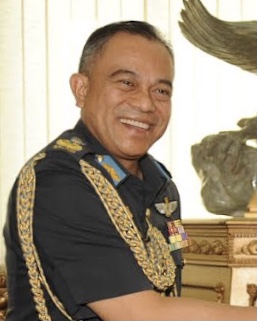
- Brigadier general Wardi in 2015

5th Commander of the Royal Brunei Air Force
- In office 7 December 2012 – 26 September 2015
- Monarch: Hassanal Bolkiah
- Deputy: Hamzah Sahat
- Preceded by: Jofri Abdullah
- Succeeded by: Shahril Anwar

Personal details
- Born: Brunei
- Education: RAF College Cranwell; Massey University; Australian Defence College; Harvard Kennedy School
- Profession: Military officer

Military service
- Allegiance: Brunei
- Branch/service: Royal Brunei Air Force
- Years of service: 1984–2015
- Rank: Brigadier General
- Unit: No. 1 Squadron (Bell 212); No. 5 Squadron (CN-235)
- Commands: Royal Brunei Air Force

Wardi bin Haji Abdul Latip is a Bruneian military officer who became the commander of the Royal Brunei Air Force (RBAirF) from 2012 to 2015. Notably, he was also the Bruneian defence attaché to China in 2007.

== Military career ==
From 1982 to 1983, Wardi served as a pioneer in the Boys Company, before enlisting in the Royal Brunei Armed Forces (RBAF), and assigned his service number 231. After successfully completing his military officer training, he was later appointed as second lieutenant in December 1984. As a student pilot at No. 3 Basic Squadron Flight Training School in the RBAirF's Training Wing from 1984 to 1986, he started his flying career. He became a co-pilot for the Bell 212 helicopter at No. 1 Squadron, after finishing his flight training. He was fully operational as a pilot flying the Bell 212 for three years with No. 1 Squadron, after obtaining combat status six months later.

In 1989, Colonel Wardi was among the tiny group chosen to get training in fighter jets at RAF Church Fenton in Yorkshire, England. Starting with the Refresher Fast Jet Course for 82 flight hours in a BAC Jet Provost Mk5, he underwent training in stages. At RAF Valley on Anglesey, North Wales, he then continued his Advanced Flying Training on the Hawk T Mk1. In addition, he was chosen to be a pilot for the Maritime Reconnaissance Aircraft Programme, and was transferred to Palmerstone North, New Zealand's Massey Air University, School of Aviation, to get a 'Multi-engine Pilot Licence' in 1994. He received the Conversion Flying Training in November 1997, after finishing this training. He founded No. 5 Squadron, which was formally established on 12 December 1997, after bringing the first IPTN CN-235 aircraft to Brunei upon completion of the training.

In 2007, he was appointed to serve as the defence attaché at the Brunei embassy in Beijing, China. From 7 to 9 September 2015, alongside his delegations, he attended a three-day farewell visit to Singapore. The Royal Brunei Air Force has a new commander, with His Majesty the Sultan and Yang Di-Pertuan of Brunei Darussalam's approval. Brigadier General Wardi Abdul Latip and Colonel Shahril Anwar exchanged command during a ceremony for the RBAirF. On 25 September 2015, the Royal Brunei Air Force's headquarters at Royal Brunei Air Force Base, Rimba, hosted a ceremony to mark the handover. On the next day, the new commander was officially appointed.

=== Military education ===
Throughout his career, he attended several institutes and training overseas, including the Initial Officer Training (IOT) at the Royal Air Force College Cranwell in Lincolnshire, England, in December 1984; the Refresher Fast Jet Course at RAF Church Fenton in North Yorkshire, England, in 1989; obtained his Multi-Engine Pilot Licence at the Palmerstone North, New Zealand's Massey Air University, in 1994; completed the Conversion Flying Training in November 1997; SAR Executive Planner Workshops organised by the Civil Aviation Authority Brunei (CAA Brunei); Flight Safety and Flight Supervisor Course at RAF Bentley Priory; Maritime Surveillance Course at the Australian Defence Force Warfare Centre (ADFWC); Maritime Surveillance Course at the SAFTI Military Institute (SAFTI); Malaysian Electronic Warfare Symposium, in 1996; Japanese Multinational Cooperation Assistance Programme, in 2005; Australian Proliferation of Security Initiatives in 2005; and ASEAN+3 workshop on the Participation in International Disaster Relief Operation, China ASEAN Dialogue by Senior Defence Scholars on Regional Security Mechanism and Defence Policy in China between 2007 and 2008. Latterly, he attended the Leadership for the 21st Century: Chaos, Conflict and Courage in Oct 2011 at Harvard Kennedy School, United States.

== Later life ==
2011 saw his appointment as the Ministry of Defence Brunei Darussalam's Director of Personnel. On 26 June 2013, a golf tournament between the services took place at the Royal Brunei Armed Forces Golf Club. Wardi Abdul Latip represented the RBAF Training Institute. Later that year on 30 September, the Royal Brunei Air Force received the new Air Movement Centre (AMC) in a formal handover; he came after the Director of DDWS and before the Permanent Secretary, Azmansham Mohamad. Wardi was appointed as the Director of Aviation under His Majesty at the Aviation Office on 14 October 2017, according to the Department of Public Services (JPA). This follows permission from Sultan Hassanal Bolkiah.

== Honours ==
=== Things named after ===
- Wardi Drive, road name within Royal Brunei Air Force Base, Rimba, officiated on 22 April 2022.

=== National ===
- Order of Pahlawan Negara Brunei First Class (PSPNB; 14 August 2014) – Dato Seri Pahlawan
- Order of Setia Negara Brunei Fourth Class (PSB)
- Order of Seri Paduka Mahkota Brunei Third Class (SMB)
- Long Service Medal and Good Conduct (PKLPB)
- Silver Jubilee Medal (5 October 1992)
- General Service Medal (Armed Forces)
- Royal Brunei Armed Forces Silver Jubilee Medal (31 May 1986)
- Royal Brunei Armed Forces Golden Jubilee Medal (31 May 2011)

=== Foreign ===
- China:
  - Commemorative Medal (PCM)
- Indonesia:
  - TNI AU Honorary Pilot Wings (1997)
- Malaysia:
  - Courageous Commander of The Most Gallant Order of Military Service (PGAT; 4 December 2014)
  - RMAF Honorary Pilot Wings (5 August 2015)
- Singapore:
  - Pingat Jasa Gemilang (Tentera) (PJG; 2014)
  - RSAF Honorary Pilot Wing (2013)
- Thailand:
  - Honorary Pilot Wings (27 July 2015)

Military offices
Preceded by Jofri Abdullah	5th Commander of the Royal Brunei Air Force; 7 December 2012 – 26 September 2015	Succeeded by Shahril Anwar
