= Brunei Darussalam International Defence Exhibition =

Military and security exhibition in Brunei Darussalam

Coordinates: 04°56′59.8″N 114°50′05.9″E

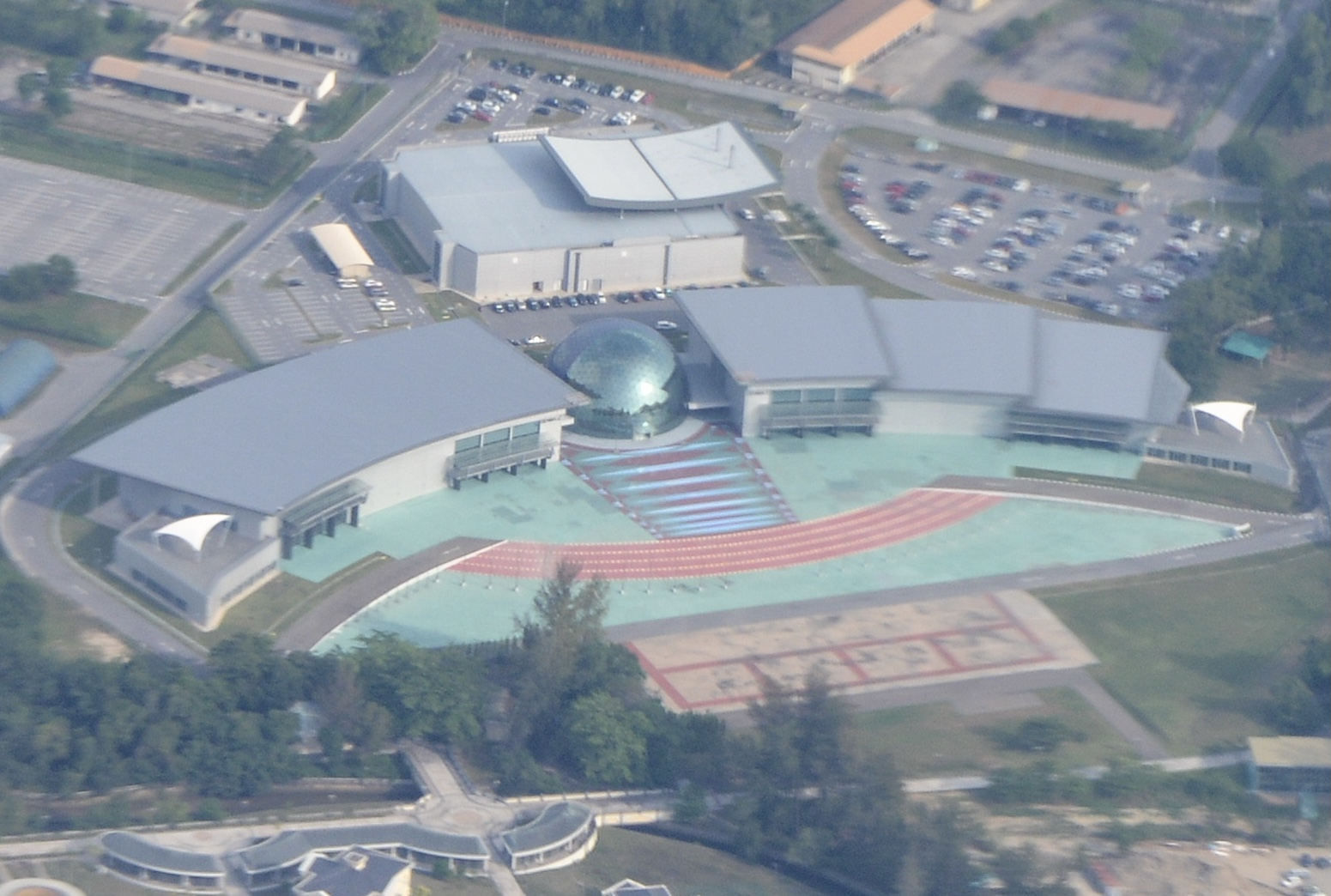
BRIDEX International Conference Centre in 2014

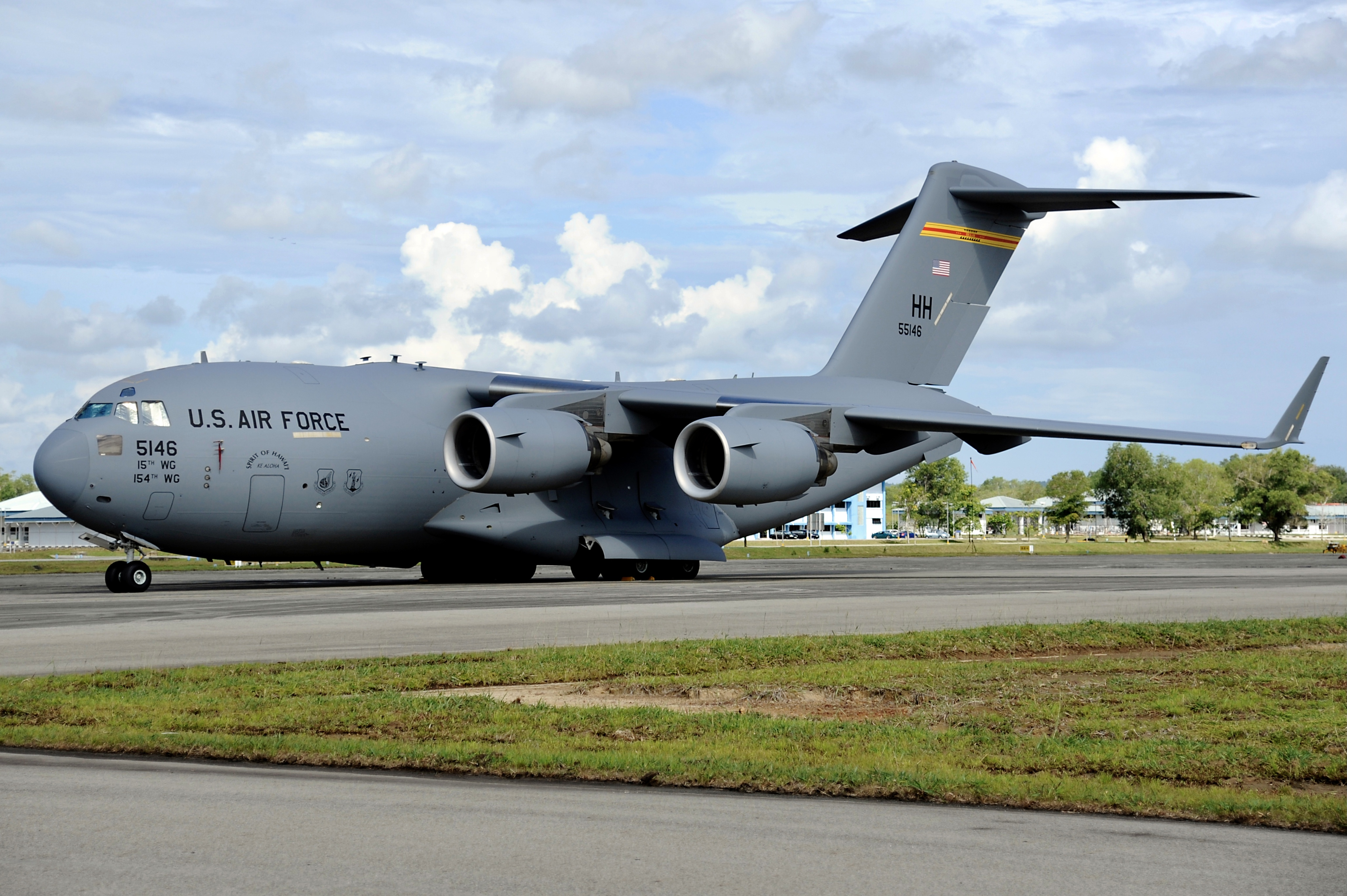
A US Air Force Globemaster III at Royal Brunei Air Force Base, Rimba, for BRIDEX 2011

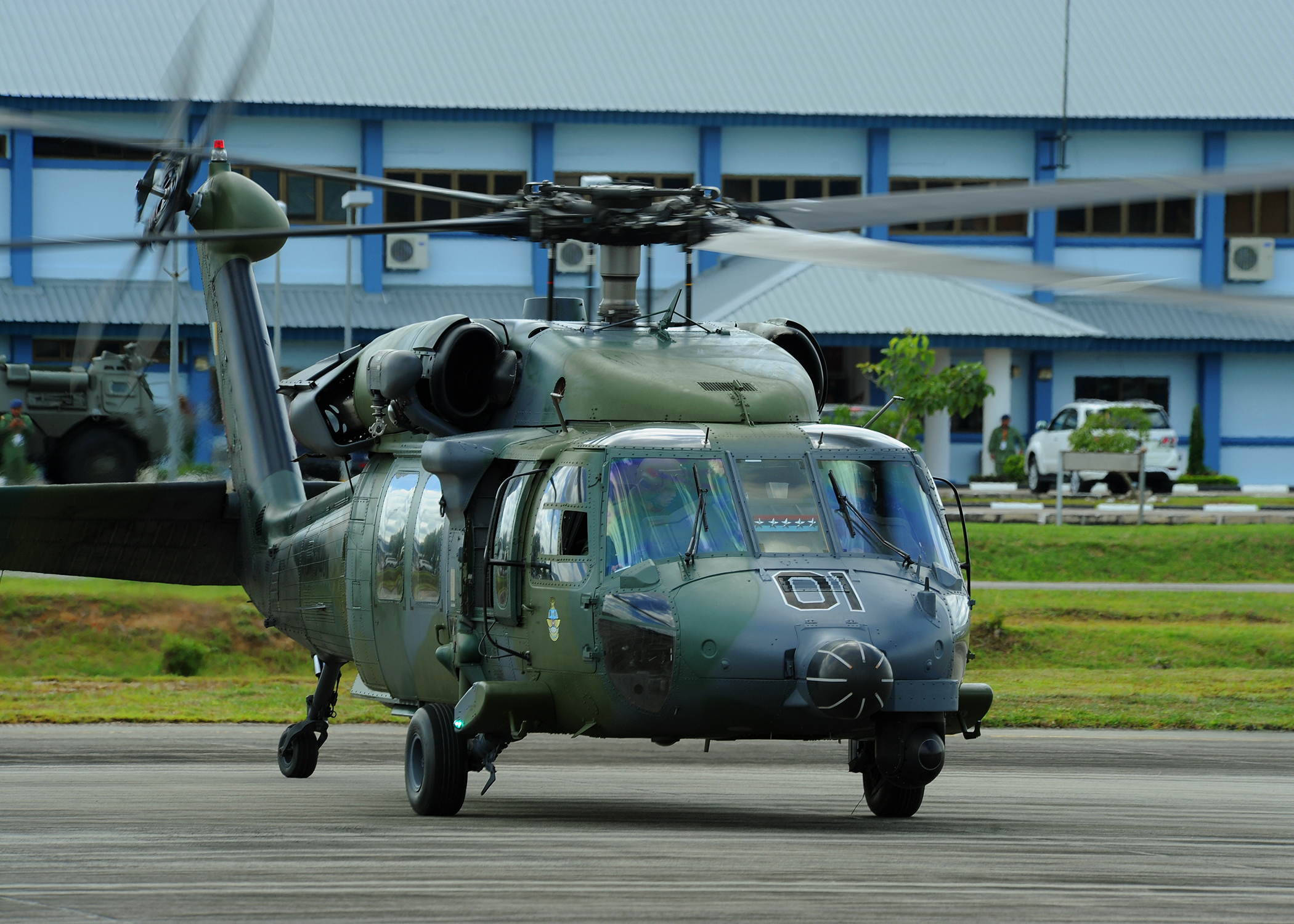
11 Squadron RBAirF S70i Blackhawk static display at Royal Brunei Air Force Base, Rimba during BRIDEX 2013

The Brunei Darussalam International Defence Exhibition and Conference (BRIDEX), originally Brunei Darussalam International Defence Exhibition, was a biennial defence and security exhibition and conference held in Negara Brunei Darussalam. Involving all three service branches of the Royal Brunei Armed Forces (RBAF), it started in 2007, and was launched by the Ministry of Defence (MinDef).

The final BRIDEX event to take place was from 3 to 7 December 2013. The Ministry of Defence appointed Royal Brunei Technical Services (RBTS) as organisers of the event.

== Venue ==
In 2009, the BRIDEX International Conference Centre, Jerudong was purpose-built for BRIDEX events on a 26 acres (11 hectares) site near the Royal Brunei Polo and Riding Club, five minutes from the Empire Hotel and Country Club. Exhibitors and visitors benefit from 10,000 square metres (110,000 square feet) of modern air-conditioned exhibition halls; 5,000 square metres (54,000 square feet) adjoining apron space for static displays; a mobility park and marina for live demonstrations of equipment and systems; chalets, restaurants and hospitality facilities. The conceptual design was conceived within three hours, and the construction was completed within nine months. The building complex was design by its principal architect, Ar. Masri Haji Mohd Taha, a British-trained Bruneian Chartered Architect.

== History ==
=== BRIDEX 2007 ===
The first BRIDEX took place from 31 May to 2 June 2007 at the International Convention Centre, established and organised by the Ministry of Defence, Brunei Darussalam. The event received the participation of 108 companies from sixteen countries, and 11,000 members of the public visited the event during the three-day period.

=== BRIDEX 2009 ===
The second BRIDEX took place from 12 to 15 August 2009. The Ministry of Defence had appointed Royal Brunei Technical Services (RBTS), the solely authorised procurement agency of sensitive and strategic goods for the country, as the organisers of the event, with an increase in exhibitors (approximately 250 companies from twenty-five countries) showcasing their products. There were also rises in the number of visitors from previous event (14,000). On the opening day, Wednesday 12, personnel from the Special Task Force of the Royal Brunei Armed Forces (RBAF) carried out a demonstration of their military skills to commemorate the opening of the then new BRIDEX International Conference Centre.

=== BRIDEX 2011 ===
Its third occurrence, BRIDEX 2011 took place from 6 to 9 July 2011. Following the previous event, exhibitors were again limited to approximately 250 companies, however, the 2011 event held special significance as it coincided with the golden anniversary of RBAF. During BRIDEX 2011, the Royal Brunei Navy (RBN) celebrated its 46th anniversary at the Muara Naval Base, in which twenty-four warships from ten countries were invited. Notably, this was the first time the USA attended BRIDEX, which was co-located at Royal Brunei Air Force Base, Rimba; the United States Air Force (USAF) sent General Dynamics F-16s from Misawa Air Base, Japan to conduct aerial demonstrations. Furthermore, a Boeing CH-47SD/F Chinook from the Republic of Singapore Air Force (RSAF) was sent for static display within Hangar B of the airbase, and the Royal Malaysian Air Force (RMAF) sent a Mikoyan-Gurevich MiG-29N from 19 Squadron.

=== BRIDEX 2013 ===
BRIDEX 2013 was the fourth and final iteration of this event. Originally scheduled to take place from 8 to 12 October 2013, it was deferred and took place from 3 to 7 December 2013. It was again held at the BRIDEX International Conference Centre, and co-located at Royal Brunei Air Force Base, Rimba.

Notably, BRIDEX 2013 seen the introduction of a newer Blackhawk helicopter variant into the Royal Brunei Air Force (RBAirF), the Polish-manufactured Sikorsky S70i Blackhawk, unveiled by His Majesty the Sultan of Brunei. The USA again had participation, sending a single USAF Boeing C-17 Globemaster III of the 545th Airlift Squadron from Joint Base Pearl Harbor–Hickam, Hawaii, a United States Marine Corps (USMC) Bell Boeing MV-22B Osprey, and a Lockheed Martin KC-130J Super Hercules.
