= Royal Brunei Air Force Base, Rimba =

Royal Brunei Air Force military airbase in Rimba, Brunei-Muara, Brunei Darussalam

- Pangkalan Tentera Udara Diraja Brunei, Rimba ڤڠكالن تنترا اودارا دراج بروني، ريمبا
- Rimba, Gadong 'A', Brunei-Muara; Near Bandar Seri Begawan in Brunei Darussalam
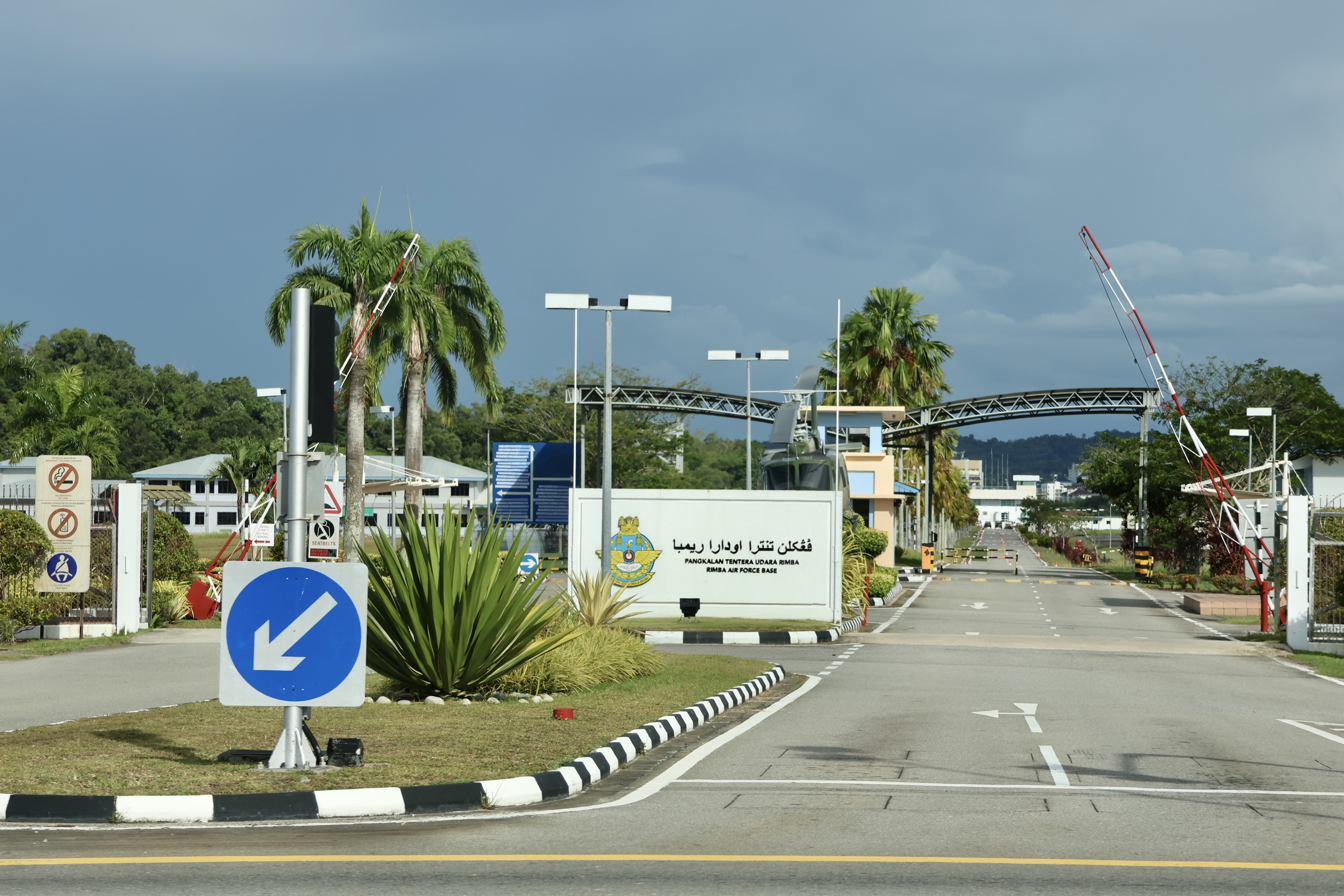
- Royal Brunei Air Force Base, Rimba's main gate in 2023

Site information
- Type: Military airbase and headquarters
- Owner: Ministry of Defence
- Operator: Royal Brunei Air Force
- Condition: Operational
- Website: mindef.gov.bn

Location
- Location in Brunei
- Coordinates: 04°56′54″N 114°55′25″E

Garrison information
- Current commander: Brig Gen Mohammad Sharif Ibrahim
- Past commanders: Brig Gen Mahmud Saidin (first Bruneian with fighter pilots' licence)
- Occupants: see below

Airfield information
- Identifiers: IATA: BWN, ICAO: WBSB
- Elevation: 22 metres (72 feet) AMSL
Runways
Direction	Length and surface
03/21	3,685 m (12,090 ft) asphalt concrete
- Notes: Aerodrome facilities are shared with Brunei International Airport.

Officially known as Royal Brunei Air Force Base, Rimba (Malay: Pangkalan Tentera Udara Diraja Brunei, Rimba), commonly known as Rimba Air Force Base (Pangkalan Tentera Udara Rimba), occasionally known as Rimba Airbase, and informally abbreviated Rimba AFB; it is the military headquarters and main operating airbase of the Royal Brunei Air Force (RBAirF, originally Angkatan Tentera Udara Diraja Brunei - ATUDB; from 2005 to Tentera Udara Diraja Brunei - TUDB). It is located near the Bruneian village of Kampong Rimba, opposite, and sharing its main runway of 3,685 metres (12,090 feet) with the Brunei International Airport (BIA), at Bandar Seri Begawan, in the Brunei-Muara District of the sultanate of Brunei Darussalam.

== History and operations ==
=== 20th century ===
Aviation in the sultanate of Brunei Darussalam arose due to a government desire to provide medical services in the rural areas of its territory. In 1965, two Sikorsky S55 helicopters were contracted from the Worldwide Helicopter Company to fly doctors by helicopter to remote areas, particularly those which were inaccessible by road. In 1966, this service was taken over by three British pilots from the Royal Air Force (RAF), operating three RAF Westland Whirlwind helicopters, thereby signifying the start of military aviation in Brunei, officially becoming a helicopter platoon. In 1967, the Whirlwinds were replaced by a pair of Westland Wessex Mk54 (Bruneian export version of the RAF HC2 variant; construction numbers and registration: wa563 (built 1966) / AMDB-106, and wa695 (1969) / AMDB-101). Three years later, in 1969, it was officially named the Air Wing, and the same year, deliveries of the first of five Bell 206 Jet Ranger helicopters (four 206A, and subsequently two 206B-3; construction numbers and registration: 579 / AMDB-103, 580 / AMDB-104, 110 / AMDB-107, 325 / AMDB-109, 2896 / AMDB-121 [reassigned TUDB-305], and 2898 / AMDB-122 [reassigned TUDB-306]) arrived to enter service. A sixth airframe was later procured to replace a hull loss.

In 1970, prior to Rimba Air Force Base, the military Air Wing of Brunei then started to operate a pair of Bell 205 helicopters from Berakas Garrison, forming No. 1 Squadron. These were subsequently replaced in 1974 by Bell 212 helicopters. No. 2 Squadron was formed in 1981, equipped with six German Bolkow BO105-CBS helicopters (construction numbers and registration: S-408 / 123, S-409 / 124, S-410 / 125, S-411 / 126, S-412 / 127, and S-581 / 100) operating in the close air support (CAS) role. In 1982, No. 3 Squadron was established to operate a pair of SIAI Marchetti SF260W fixed-wing training aircraft.

In 1984, as a result of the independence of Brunei Darussalam from the United Kingdom (UK), the Air Wing came under the official command of Command Task Force, Royal Brunei Armed Forces (RBAF). On 1 October 1991, the Air Wing, Royal Brunei Armed Forces became an independent service (air force) of Royal Brunei Armed Forces, and was officially named the Royal Brunei Air Force (RBAirF), or Angkatan Tentera Udara Diraja Brunei (ATUDB) in Malay. It was also operating from Penanjong Garrison during this period. In 1996 at Penanjong Garrison, the sultan Presented Royal and Service Colours to the Royal Brunei Air Force.

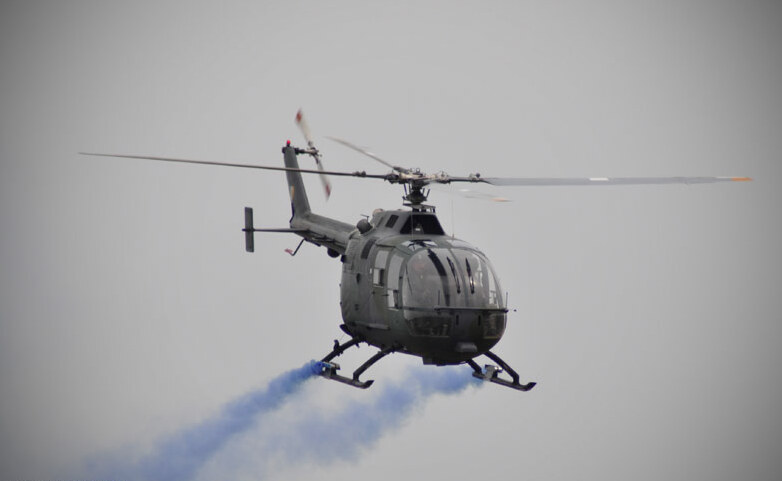
Bolkow BO105-CBS helicopter trails blue smoke during RBAirF / TUDB anniversary display at Royal Brunei Air Force Base, Rimba, 31 May 2009.

At the now established airbase of Royal Brunei Air Force Base, Rimba, 1997 saw the arrival of Sikorsky S70A-14 Blackhawk helicopters, and more significantly, a fixed-wing military transport aircraft, namely the IPTN CN235-110M (construction number: N-033, registration: ATUDB 501, subsequently re-registered TUDB 501). This resulted in the official formation of No. 4 Squadron and No. 5 Squadron on 12 September 1997. Four fixed-wing training aircraft were acquired in 1998, the tandem-seat turboprop Pilatus PC-7 Mk.II, originally operated by No. 3 Squadron. Security of the RBAirF at Rimba was enhanced on 4 January 1999, with the formation of an Air Regiment and a Base Defence Squadron, along with the introduction of the French-made Mistral missile system operated by No. 38 Squadron.

=== 21st century ===
Following the change on 1 January 2005 of the official Malay name of the Royal Brunei Air Force to Tentera Udara Diraja Brunei (TUDB), the first of the three ordered Sikorsky S-92 helicopters by Brunei Shell Petroleum (BSP) arrived at Royal Brunei Air Force Base, Rimba, on 25 February 2007, before being transferred to their scheduled home base at Anduki Airfield (WBAK). These aircraft were transported by an Antonov An-124 from Bradley International Airport, Windsor Locks, Connecticut, USA.

During BRIDEX 2011, the United States Air Force (USAF) made their first ever participation in the event, with General Dynamics F-16s from Misawa Air Base, Japan, conducting aerial demonstrations over Royal Brunei Air Force Base, Rimba. Additionally, the Republic of Singapore Air Force (RSAF) sent a Boeing CH-47SD/F Chinook for static display within Hangar B of the airbase, and the Royal Malaysian Air Force (RMAF, Tentera Udara Diraja Malaysia, TUDM) sent a Mikoyan-Gurevich MiG-29N from 19 Squadron.

On the morning of 20 July 2012, having departing Royal Brunei Air Force Base, Rimba at 08:55, a RBAirF Bell 212 was due to return to the airbase later that same morning, but subsequently was found crashed with the loss of twelve of the fourteen onboard military personnel in Ulu Rampayoh, Mukim Labi. Investigations by the Supreme Board of Inquiry of the Royal Brunei Armed Forces (RBAF) concluded that the crash was caused by human error whilst in flight; specifically 'unauthorised low-level flying' which resulted in a controlled flight into terrain (CFIT). At the time of the crash, believed to be approximately 10:15, the aircraft was being operated by three crew; also on board were two trainers, one staff, and eight officer cadets.

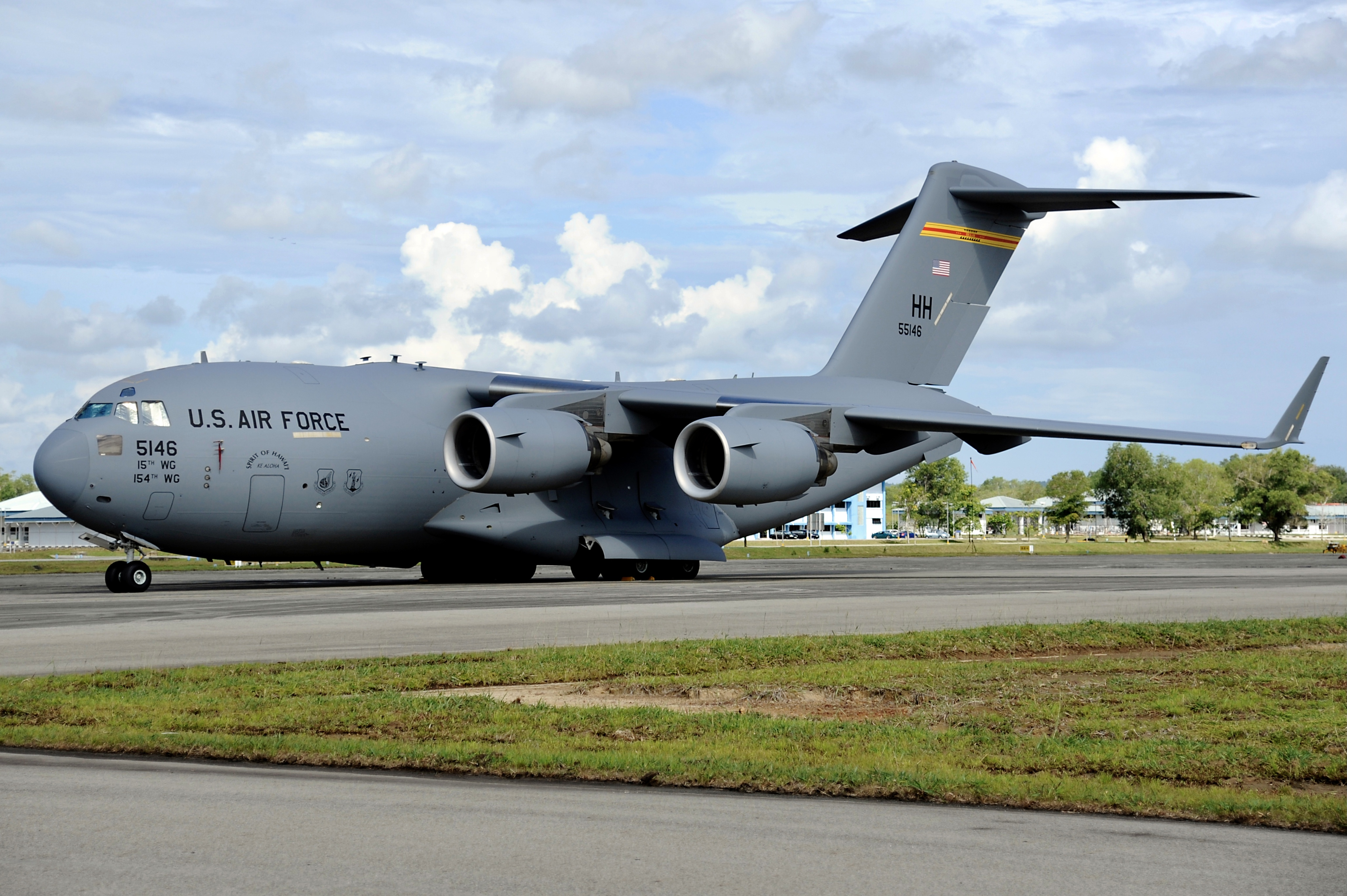
A US Air Force Globemaster III (registration 05–5146) visits Royal Brunei Air Force Base, Rimba, in 2011.

On 30 September 2013, the newly completed Air Movement Centre (AMC) within the airbase was officially handed over to the RBAirF; during the ceremony, the main contractor LSL Sdn Bhd presented a mock key (via a formal chain of Bruneian officials and government ministers) to the then Commander of the Royal Brunei Air Force, Brigadier General Wardi Abdul Latip. Designed by Arkitek KHA, construction of the new AMC began on 29 April 2013, and cost approximately B$3.9 million. The main purpose of the AMC is to provide arrivals and departure facilities for all Royal Brunei Armed Forces (RBAF) personnel transiting to and from Brunei, along with other nations forces, and will also be used for officials using non-commercial flights.

The fourth Brunei Darussalam International Defence Exhibition (BRIDEX) meet in 2013 seen the introduction of the newer Blackhawk variant into the Royal Brunei Air Force, the Polish-manufactured Sikorsky S70i Blackhawk, unveiled by His Majesty the Sultan of Brunei. This new acquisition of the S70i fleet marked the end and retirement of the entire fleet of Bell 212, which spanned forty years service in the RBAirF. BRIDEX 2013 again had participation from the United States of America, by sending a single USAF Boeing C-17 Globemaster III of the 545th Airlift Squadron from Joint Base Pearl Harbor–Hickam, Hawaii, a United States Marine Corps (USMC) Bell Boeing MV-22B Osprey, and a Lockheed Martin KC-130J Super Hercules.

On 24 February 2016, eight Republic of Korea Air Force (RoKAF) KAI T-50B of the 53rd Air Demonstration Group, 'Black Eagles' made a planned refuelling stop at the airbase, and later on 24 June, the RBAirF revealed a 50th anniversary monument at the Air Movement Centre (AMC), Air Force Base, Rimba. Later that year on 16 November 2016, four Royal Air Force (RAF) Eurofighter Typhoon FGR4 multi-role combat fighter jets supported by an RAF Voyager tanker-transport visited the airbase. On 18 July 2017, an RAF A400M Atlas C1 from No. 70 Squadron RAF visited the airbase, and later from 27 until 29 July 2017, a Boeing KC-767J tanker-transport from the 404th Tactical Airlift Tanker Squadron (第404飛行隊) of the Japan Air Self-Defence Force (JASDF) made a goodwill visit to the base.

On 24 September 2019, Royal Brunei Air Force Base, Rimba was one of the locations used as a training area for Exercise Setia Bersama (Loyal Together) 1/2019, the nationwide ten-day military exercise conducted by the Royal Brunei Armed Forces (RBAF / ABDB) in Brunei Darussalam. Military assets from various parts of the RBAF test and assess their level of preparedness at both operational and tactical levels, and cooperated with other agencies and 'grassroots' leaders from all districts of Brunei, and included all military camp bases. A month later, United States and Brunei joint exercise Cooperation Afloat Readiness and Training (CARAT) was held at the base on 22 October 2019. Also noted during CARAT 2019, a USAF Boeing P-8A Poseidon operated by Patrol Squadron (VP) 10 was present at the airbase.

On 2 November 2019 at 16:55, the main gate of Royal Brunei Air Force Base, Rimba was damaged when a man in a hijacked car used it to ram into the main gate "a few times". The car, with a young boy inside, was hijacked by 24 year old Muhammad Firdaus bin Mohammad Salleh, and the impact caused the main gate to fall, which then damaged two cars parked nearby. Muhammad Firdaus failed to enter a plea to the charge of 'committing an act endangering the lives of the public' when appearing at the Magistrates' Court on 4 November 2019. The defendant could face a fine and up to three years imprisonment if convicted; his case was referred to the Deputy Public Prosecutor for a further hearing on 11 November 2019, which was then adjourned by three weeks until 2 December. On 8 February 2021, local man Muhammad Firdaus bin Mohammad Salleh was given a custodial sentence of two years six months imprisonment plus three strokes of the cane after pleading guilty at the High Court. The damage caused to the main gates was assessed to be over BND 8,000. (Note: ≈ £4,800 / €5,500 / US$6,000 as of December 2023.)

On 14 May 2020, medical supplies donated by China to help combat the COVID-19 pandemic in Brunei arrived at Royal Brunei Air Force Base, Rimba, on board an Ilyushin IL-76 from the China's People's Liberation Army Air Force (PLAAF). The Air Movements Centre (AMC) at Rimba processed the 128 boxes of medical equipment; which included laboratory and thermal screening equipment (testing kits and ventilator support equipment), personal protective equipment (PPE), and sanitising and disinfectant products.

From 26 until 28 January 2021, the Royal Brunei Air Force's Fire Service Flight of No. 3 Wing RBAirF completed an Aviation Rescue Fire Fighting (ARFF) exercise at the Royal Brunei Air Force Base, Rimba. Aside from testing the competency and effectiveness of the firefighting crews and associated emergency services, its aim was also to refine and produce an updated Standard Operating Procedure (SOP). On 25 June 2021, a parade was held at the Air Movement Centre (AMC), Rimba, in celebration of the RBAF / ABDB 55th anniversary. Of note was the introduction of Insitu Integrator into the RBAirF, a drone unmanned aerial system (UAS). The decommissioning ceremony of the RBAirF's Bolkow BO105 fleet was held at the AMC within the Air Force Base, Rimba, on 5 February 2022. First introduced as a fleet of six helicopters into No. 2 Squadron, Air Wing in 1981, administered and maintained by the Royal Electrical and Mechanical Engineers (REME) from the United Kingdom until 1993, this ended 41 years' service of the type as latterly operated by No. 1 Wing, Operations Group.

From 24 until 26 January 2023 at Royal Brunei Air Force Base, Rimba, Major (U) Muhammad Isyhak bin Haji Ismail, Acting Commanding Officer of No. 2 Wing RBAirF, took part in a three-day Air Domain Awareness Subject Matter Expert Exchange via video-conference to the Pacific Integrated Air and Missile Defence (IAMD) Centre. On 31 May 2023, Royal Brunei Air Force Base, Rimba was again the host for the grand parade, celebrating the 62nd anniversary of the Royal Brunei Armed Forces. During mid-2023, 606 Squadron of the Royal Auxiliary Air Force (RAuxAF) was deployed from its home base RAF Benson in England to assist the move of Brunei-based Pumas of 230 'Tiger' Squadron from temporary home base in Royal Brunei Air Force Base, Rimba. The flight effectively relocated to its British Forces Brunei permanent home base at Medicina Lines on 1 June 2023.

In December 2022, the Ministry of Defence signed a contract to purchase four new Airbus C295MW tactical transport fixed-wing aircraft from Airbus Defence and Space to replace its ageing CN235-110M. Produced at the Airbus factory in Seville, Spain, the first aircraft was handed over to the RBAirF in Seville late December 2023, and the first two aircraft (TUDB 502 and TUDB 503) arrived at Rimba on 24 January 2024.

== Current units ==
Royal Brunei Air Force Base, Rimba is currently home (or parent) to the following units.

=== No. 1 Wing RBAirF (Operations Group) ===
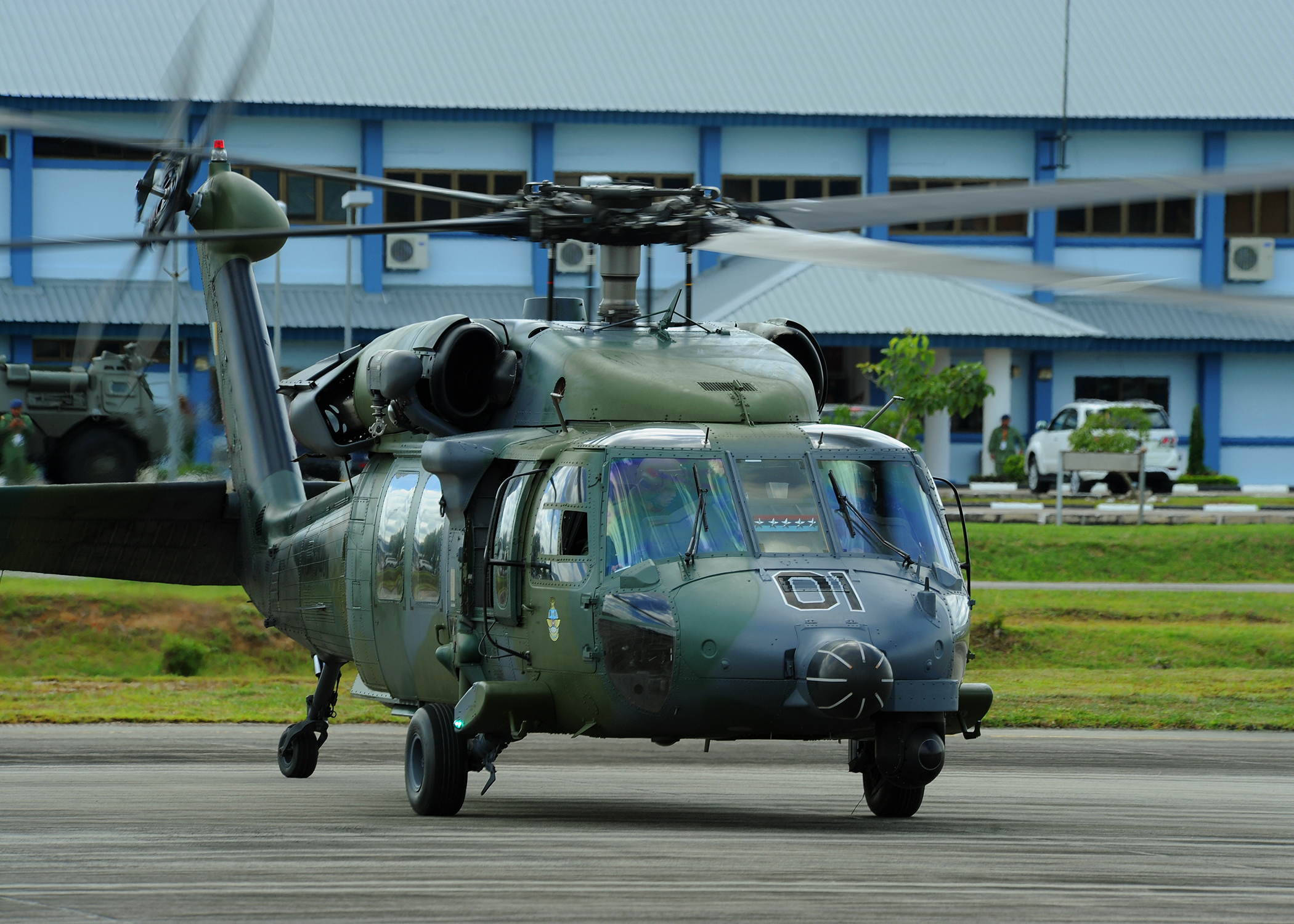
11 Squadron RBAirF / TUDB Blackhawk S70i static display at Royal Brunei Air Force Base, Rimba during BRIDEX 2013

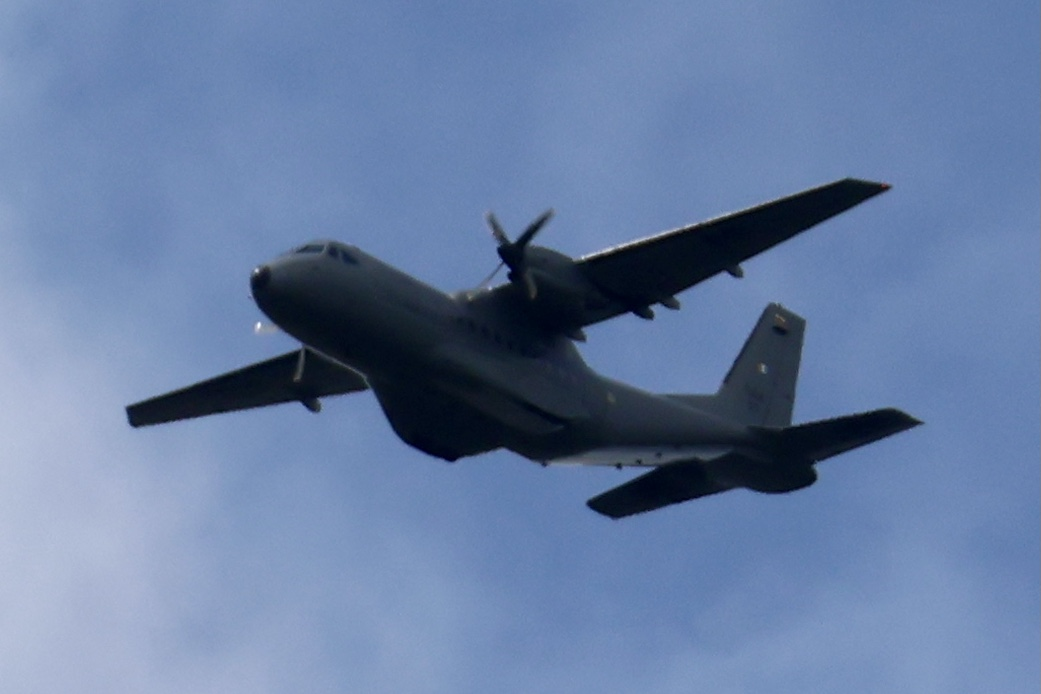
15 Squadron RBAirF / TUDB CN235-110M transport aircraft (registration TUDB 501) in flight over Jerudong from Royal Brunei Air Force Base, Rimba, 2023

All 1 Wing units are based at Rimba.

- No. 11 Squadron – formed at Berakas Garrison in 1970; 56 years ago, and originally known as 1 Squadron, operating twelve Blackhawk S70i helicopters since 2013 (replacing its former Bell 212 fleet);
- No. 12 Squadron – originally known as 2 Squadron, operated the Bolkow BO105-CBS fleet until its retirement;
- No. 14 Squadron – formed on 12 September 1997; 29 years ago, and originally known as 4 Squadron, operating the Blackhawk S70A and Blackhawk S70i helicopters in the training role;
- No. 15 Squadron – formed on 12 September 1997; 29 years ago, and originally known as 5 Squadron, operating the medium-lift fixed-wing CN235-110M transport aircraft (registration TUDB 501, originally ATUDB 501) in the cargo, troop transport, paratroop drop, and patrol (maritime and border) roles.

=== No. 2 Wing RBAirF (Air Defence Battery) ===
Established 1 September 1983; 43 years ago, from the Air Defence Battery of the Royal Brunei Malay Regiment, it was subsequently reassigned to the Royal Brunei Air Force on 24 March 1995; 31 years ago, and renamed the Air Defence Squadron, and subsequently raised to wing status. As well as operational roles, 2 Wing also provides administrative and support functions.

- No. 238 Squadron – originally known as 38 Squadron, based at Berakas Garrison (RBLF / TDDB), 238 Sqn operates Mistral, its Very Short Range Air Defence (VSHORAD) weapon system;
- No. 233 Squadron – originally known as 33 Squadron, originally based at Penanjong Garrison (RBLF / TDDB), it used to operate the Rapier FSB1, a Short Range Air Defence system until its decommissioning in 2010; 233 Sqn is now a support to 238 Squadron preparing for its new air defence system;
- No. 236 Squadron – based at Rimba, 236 Sqn is tasked with protecting the base from air and ground threats;
- Engineering Squadron – based at Berakas Garrison (RBLF / TDDB), Engineering Sqn provides maintenance support for all operational Air Defence squadrons.

=== No. 3 Wing RBAirF ===
Created on 27 July 2016; 10 years ago, No. 3 Wing was established to give support and assistance to Operational Group in achieving its mission and responsibilities.

- No. 31 Squadron (PATDU) – the Parachute Airborne Tactical Delivery Unit consists of the Jungle Rescue Team, and provides tactical supply into the jungles of Brunei;
- No. 39 Squadron – operating the five UAS Insitu Integrator RQ-21A Blackjack drones;
- Fire Brigade Unit – provides fire fighting services and related duties for aircraft and military infrastructure;
- Air Movement Flight – AMF controls all flight movements at Rimba, including military cargo;
- Airspace Control – working for the Department of Civil Aviation (DCA), this unit controls all aircraft throughout the entire Brunei airspace, and recruits qualified air traffic controllers.

=== No. 4 Wing RBAirF (Supply Headquarter) ===
4 Wing is commonly known as Supply Headquarters, and is directly responsible to the Support Group Commander.

- Domestic Supply Squadron – operates in a manner similar to a Regimental Quartermaster;
- Technical Supply Squadron – responsible for all technical supplies for the entire Royal Brunei Air Force; at its Main Store (in the 4 Wing main building) and Forward Stores (in Hangars A and B, along with 38 Sqn stores);
- Supply Control & Accounting Flight – SCAF provides administrative functions to all elements of supply operations through its five cells: Control Accounting Cell (CAC), Supply Accounting Cell (SAC), Supply Control Cell (SCC), Receipt and Despatch (R&D), and the Bulk Fuel Installation Account.

=== No. 5 Wing RBAirF (Maintenance Wing) ===
Commanded by Lieutenant Colonel (U) Pengiran Mohamed Khairul Arifin bin Pengiran Haji Mohamad Salleh, 5 Wing is the Maintenance Wing for the entire Royal Brunei Air Force, tasked with all operational and training requirements along with maintenance deadlines and handling aircraft maintenance related matters.

- No. 51 Squadron – engineering squadron, responsible for the Blackhawk S70i fleet;
- No. 52 Squadron – engineering squadron, responsible for the Bolkow BO105-CBS until their decommission;
- No. 53 Squadron – engineering squadron, responsible for the Bell 206 Jet Ranger;
- No. 54 Squadron – engineering squadron, responsible for the Blackhawk S70A;
- No. 55 Squadron – engineering squadron, responsible for the CN235-110M;
- Engineering Support Flight – provides support to all aircraft and related equipment for the entire RBAirF:
  - Ground Support Equipment (GSE);
  - Survival Equipment Section (SES) – provides support for all aircrew personal safety equipment, including flying helmets and life vests;
  - Flight Line Mechanics;
- Engineering Standard Cell – responsible for all aircraft maintenance standards and documentation;
- Engineering Planning and Control – tasked with all documenting and updating all maintenance activities;
- Maintenance Planning Resources Management – forecasts future maintenance and allocates resources;
- Technical Equipment Maintenance Division – civilian section responsible for aircraft major maintenance and inspection.

=== No. 6 Wing RBAirF (Administrative and Base Maintenance) ===
6 Wing's main role is to manage administrative issues and base maintenance in relating to the Royal Brunei Air Force operations, together with managing personnel welfare.

- Regimental Police Fleet – protects the airbase from unauthorised entry
- Pay Flight
- Base Maintenance
- Estate Maintenance Section
- Medical Reception Service
- Light Aid Detachment
- Dental
- Military Transport Flight – provides all military vehicles for land transport

=== No. 7 Wing RBAirF (Training School) ===
Previously known as Training Wing, 7 Wing is responsible for the training, administration, and welfare management of all Royal Brunei Air Force personnel, and is also an establishment for Leadership courses to fulfil the needs of the RBAirF.

- No. 73 Squadron – originally known as the Basic Flying Training School (BFTS) in the 1980s, through various renames (including previously known as 3 Squadron) to its current 73 Sqn, this provides basic and elementary flight training to all RBAirF student pilots, on both fixed-wing (Pilatus PC-7 Mk.II) and rotary-wing aircraft (Bell 206B Jet Ranger III), along with aircrew training;
- No. 75 Squadron – established in 1985; 41 years ago, as the Air Technical Training School, 75 Sqn (originally known as 65 Squadron) provides basic and advance technical courses for all RBAirF technicians;
- No. 77 Squadron – based at Berakas Garrison (RBLF / TDDB), 77 Sqn provides Air Defence training courses to personnel of No. 2 Wing RBAirF, and also all other personnel of the Royal Brunei Armed Forces (RBAF / ABDB).

== Gate guardians ==
Royal Brunei Air Force Base, Rimba displays a retired Bell UH-1 helicopter (military version of the Bell 205, construction number: 30057, registration: AMDB 100) as its gate guardian on a traffic island roundabout just inside its main gate.

== Gallery ==
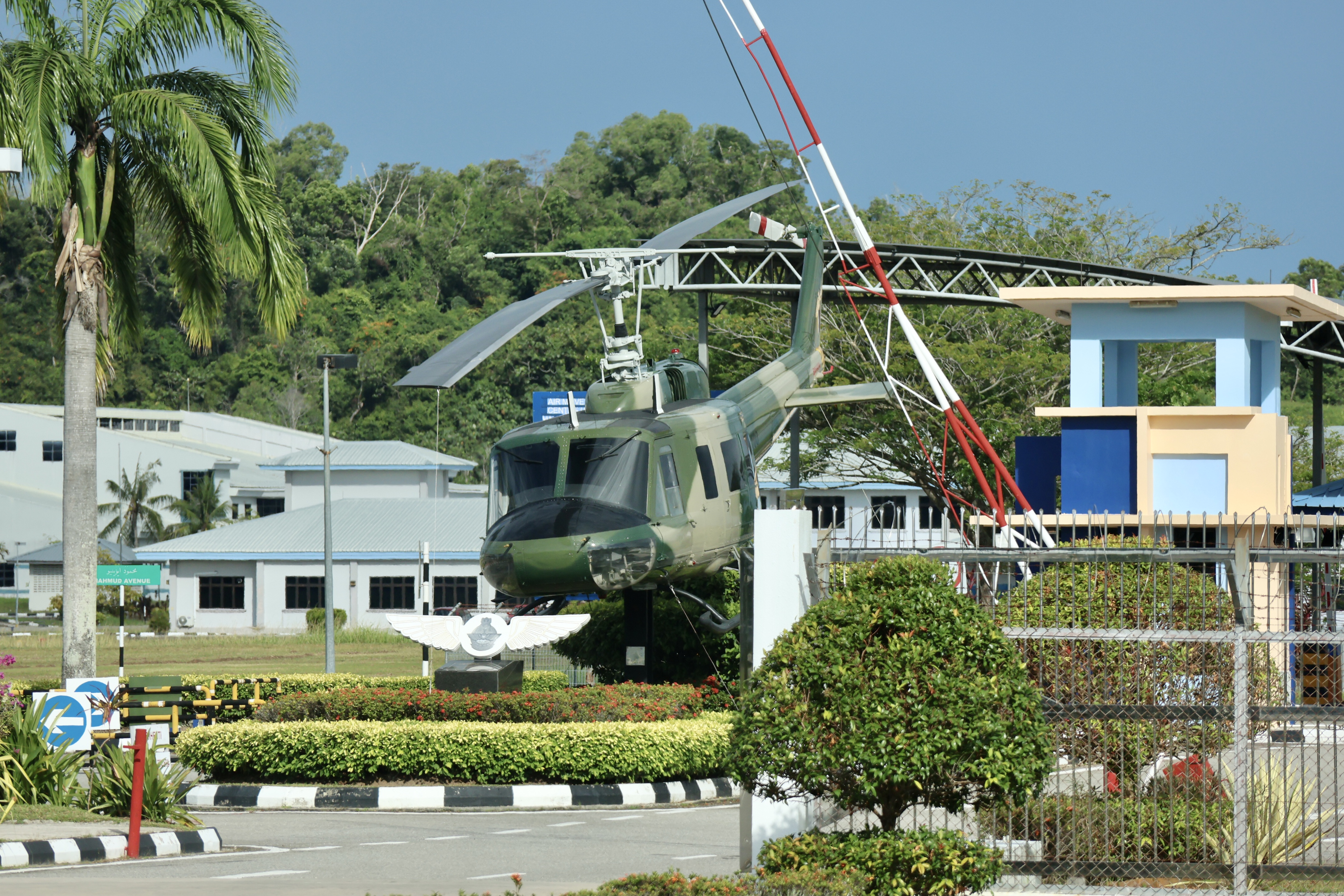
Retired RBAirF / TUDB Bell UH-1 (Bell 205, c/n: 30057, reg.: AMDB 100) helicopter gate guardian displayed inside the main gate of the airbase, September 2023

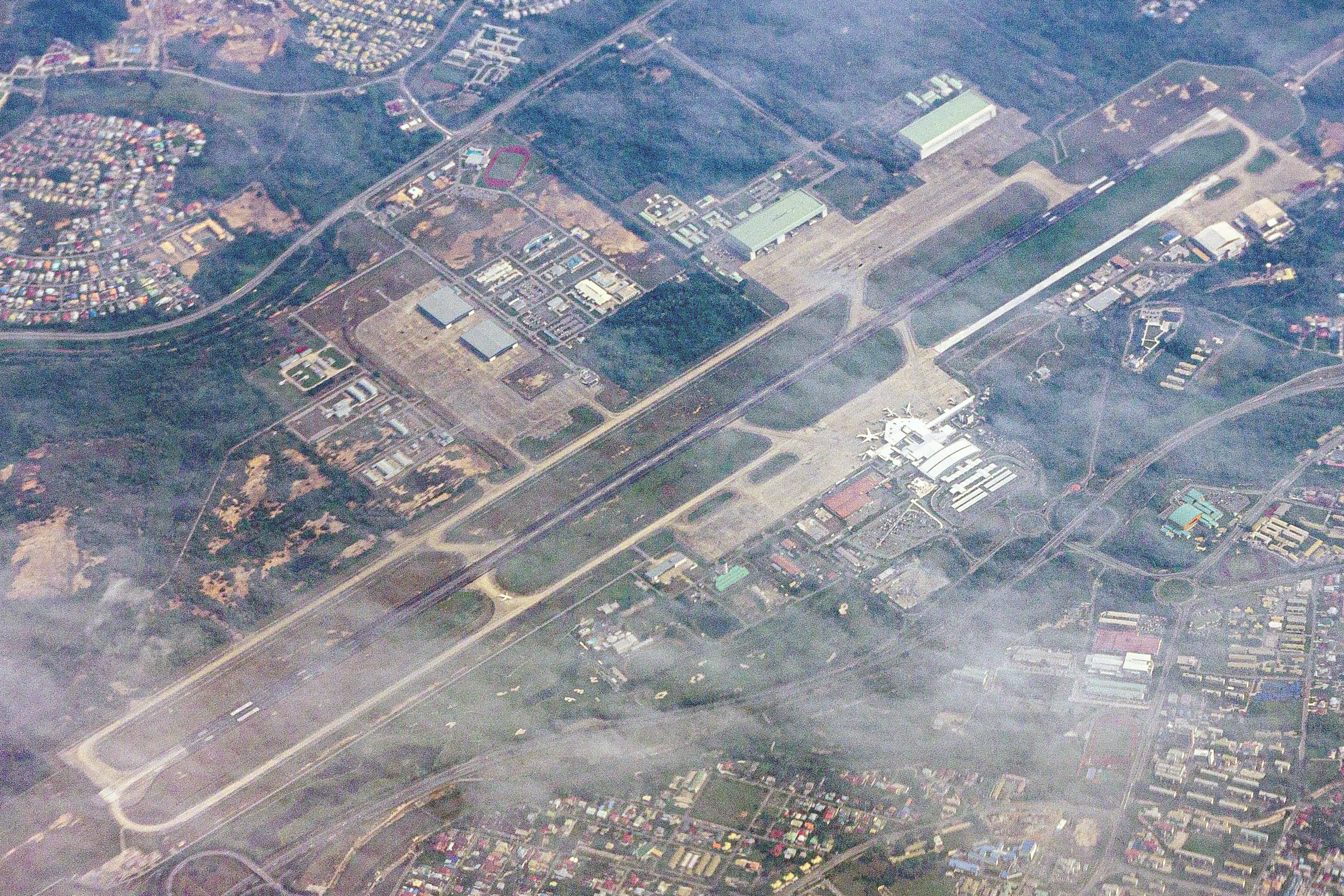
Royal Brunei Air Force Base, Rimba (top left) shares its 3,685 metres (12,090 ft) runway with the Brunei International Airport (bottom right), 2016.

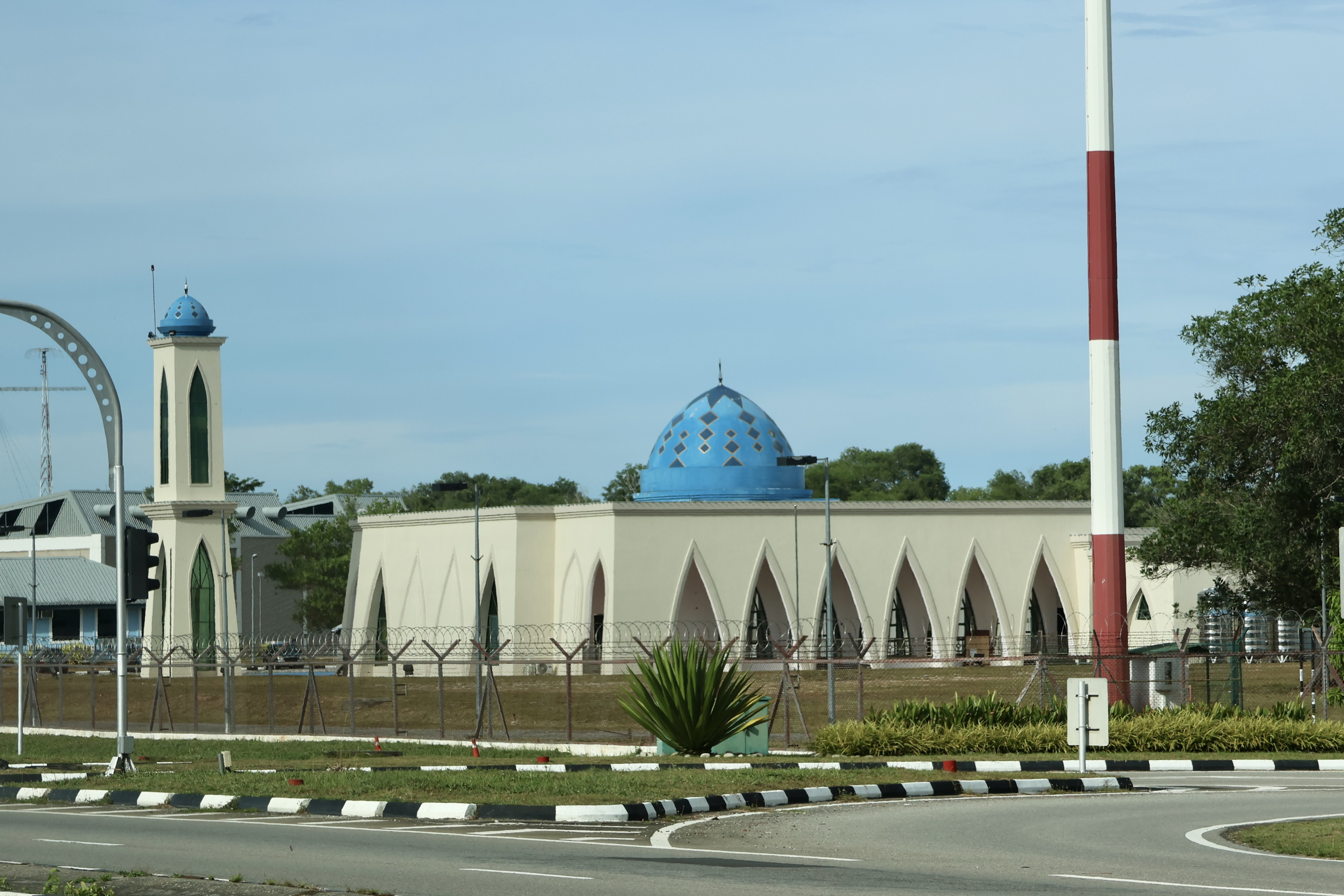
Surau Al-Barakah, the base mosque, 2023

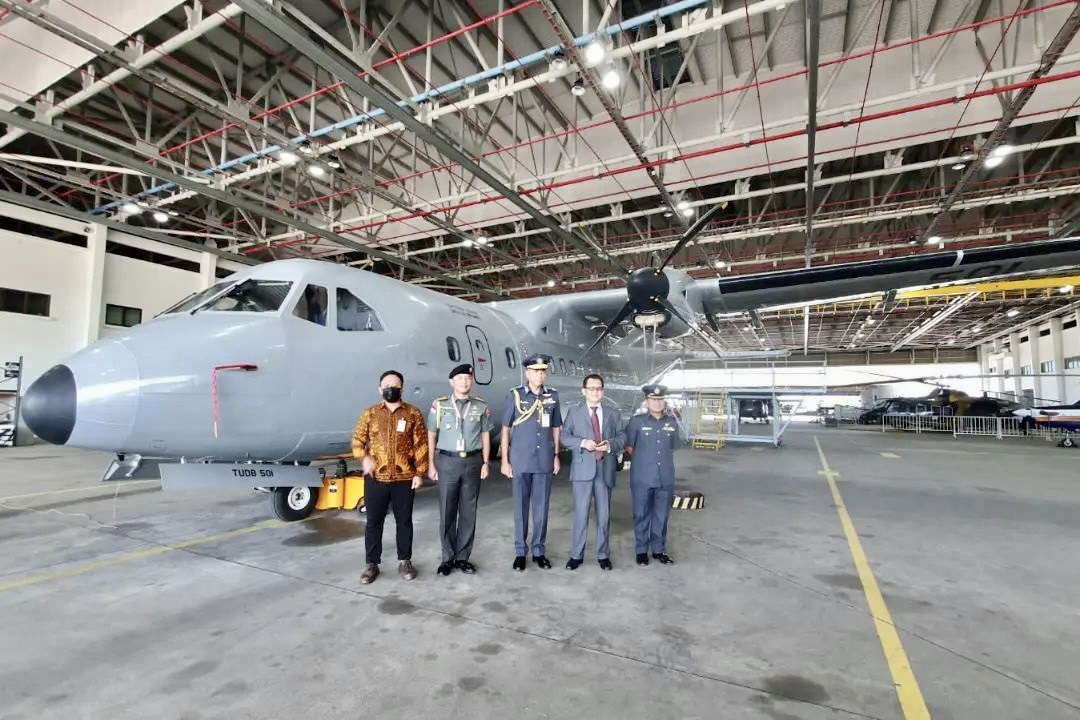
RBAirF / TUDB CN235-110M, registration TUDB 501, inside one of the hangars at Rimba, 2022

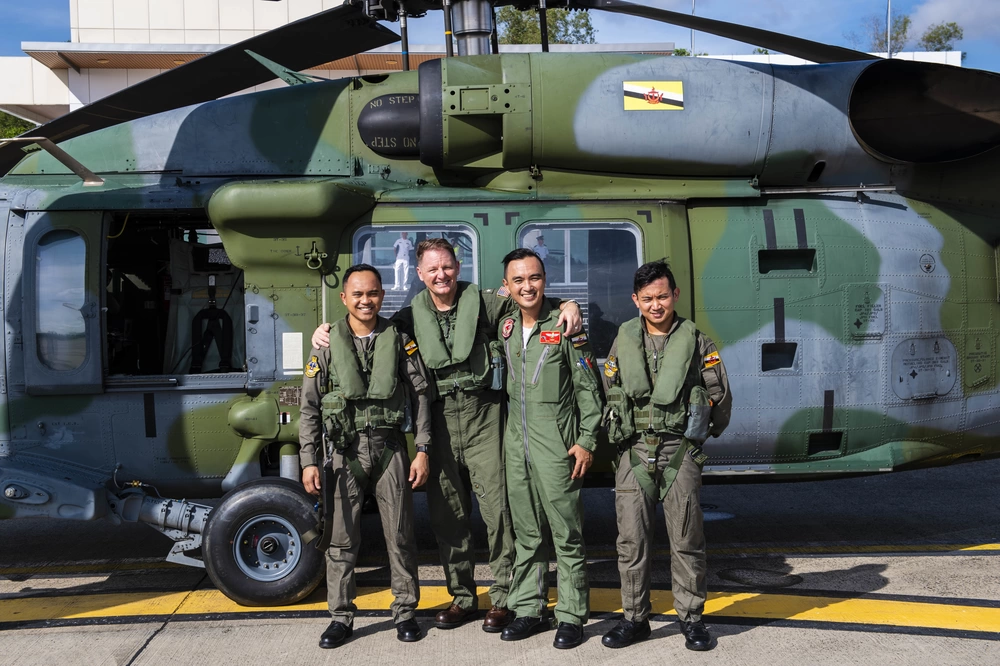
RBAirF Sikorsky S-70i and its aircrew at Rimba, 2019

== See also ==
- Bolkiah Garrison — main base and headquarters of the Royal Brunei Land Force
- Muara Naval Base — main base and headquarters of the Royal Brunei Navy
