= 2021 in aviation =

This is a list of aviation-related events in 2021. The aviation industry continued to be impacted by the COVID-19 pandemic.

== Events ==
=== January ===
7 January
Boeing settles with the US Department of Justice to pay over $2.5 billion after being charged with fraud over the Boeing 737 MAX certification: a criminal monetary penalty of $243.6 million, $1.77 billion of damages to airline customers, and a $500 million crash-victim beneficiaries fund.

9 January
Sriwijaya Air Flight 182, a Boeing 737-500, crashes off the Jakarta coast. All 62 people on board are dead.

27 January
Boeing reports its 2020 results: revenue of $58.2 billion, down from $76.6 billion the previous year, and an operating loss of $12.8 billion.

28 January
The new $1.1 billion dollar terminal at Bahrain Airport begins operations.

=== February ===
3 to 5 February
Aero India 2021 is held at Yelahanka Air Force Station in Bangalore.

9 February
LATAM Argentina folds after having stopped operations on 17 June 2020.

11 February
Air Namibia ceases operations and goes into bankruptcy.

18 February
Airbus reports its 2020 results: revenue of €49.9 billion, down from €70.5 billion the previous year, and an operating loss of €1.1 billion ($1.3 billion).

20 February
United Airlines Flight 328, a Boeing 777-200, suffers a contained engine failure of the right-hand engine over Broomfield, Colorado and the surrounding area. The flight was able to return to Denver International Airport safely with no injuries. The Federal Aviation Administration (FAA) orders emergency inspections of all 777s with the same Pratt & Whitney PW4000 engines.

26 February
The 1945th and last Bombardier CRJ is delivered.

27 February
First flight of the Boeing Airpower Teaming System of Boeing Australia.

=== March ===
10 March
First flight of the Dassault Falcon 6X.

=== April ===
27 April
Avelo Airlines begins operations with three Boeing 737-800 aircraft.
Interjet files for bankruptcy in Mexico. The airline indefinitely suspended flights on 11 December 2020 due to inadequate cash flow, and in January, most employees went on strike over unpaid wages.

=== May ===
1 May
At Hazleton, Pennsylvania, Don Kellner makes his last eight skydives, giving him a world-record lifetime total of 46,355 jumps. He dies of cancer on July 22, aged 85.

6 May
Dassault Aviation launches its $75 million Falcon 10X flagship, scheduled for 2025, to compete with the Bombardier Global 7500 and the Gulfstream G700.

12 May
Key Lime Air Flight 970, a Swearingen Metroliner, collides in mid-air with a Cirrus SR22 light aircraft near Denver's Centennial Airport. Both aircraft sustain severe damage but make safe emergency landings.

21 May
Aerion, developer of the Aerion AS2 supersonic business jet, shuts down as it lacks funds.

23 May
Ryanair Flight 4978, a Boeing 737-8AS on a routine scheduled flight from Athens International Airport to Vilnius Airport, is diverted to Minsk National Airport on the orders of Belarusian President Alexander Lukashenko under the pretence of a bomb threat. No bombs are found, but two passengers, Belarusian dissident Roman Protasevich and his girlfriend Sofia Sapega, are arrested on arrival, triggering international condemnation of the Belarusian government.

24 May
Various nations announce aviation sanctions against Belarus in reaction to the Ryanair Flight 4978 incident. Belavia, the flag carrier of Belarus, is barred from the airspace of the EU and the UK, and EU and UK airlines are instructed to avoid Belarusian airspace. Lithuania and Ukraine close their airspace to aircraft that have flown or plan to fly through Belarusian airspace, thus terminating all direct flights.

27 May
Founded by David Neeleman, US startup Breeze Airways starts commercial operations.

28 May
Rolls-Royce opens the world's largest engine testbed facility in the world, Testbed 80, in Derby.

=== June ===
3 June
United Airlines places an order for 15 Boom Overture supersonic transports, which should enter service in 2029. United is expected be the first airline to fly the Overture.

11 June
Stobart Air enters liquidation and ceases operation of all flights operated under its franchise agreement with Aer Lingus Regional.
Air Antwerp ceases operations.

18 June
Boeing 737 MAX 10 has its first flight from Renton Municipal Airport and landing at King County International Airport (Boeing Field) with a flight duration of 2.8 hours.

24 June
Icelandic start-up Play starts operations, with an inaugural flight from Keflavík to London Stansted.

29 June
Chengdu's Tianfu International Airport officially opens to supplement Chengdu Airport.

=== July ===
2 July
A Boeing 737-200 cargo aircraft operating as Transair Flight 810 ditches en route from Honolulu to Maui. Both pilots are rescued by the US Coast Guard.

4 July
A Lockheed C-130 Hercules of the Philippine Air Force overruns a runway and crashes near Jolo Airport in the Philippines, killing 53 and injuring 50 others.

6 July
An Antonov An-26 aircraft crashes near the settlement of Palana, Russia, killing all 28 people on board.

16 July
An Antonov An-28 operating Siberian Light Aviation Flight 42 crash-lands in a swamp in Tomsk after both engines fail. All 18 people on board survive the accident.

=== August ===
16 August
With the fall of Kabul to the Taliban, thousands of civilians throng the terminal and aircraft operations area of Hamid Karzai International Airport trying to flee Afghanistan, and US troops seize the facility, as several people are killed in the chaos.
An A-29 Super Tucano of the Afghan Air Force is shot down in the Surxondaryo Region in Uzbekistan after "illegally" flying into Uzbek airspace.

17 August
The first prototype Ilyushin Il-112 transport aircraft crashes near Kubinka Airfield after an engine fire. All three crew members are killed.

18 August
After troops secure the civilian side of the airport, commercial flights to Kabul Airport resume on a limited basis, with a Boeing 767 of Utair.
US military leaders state that 2,000 US citizens, NATO troops and Afghan civilians have been flown out from Kabul Airport by US forces since the fall of the city.

19 August
Uzbek authorities confirm that 46 Afghan Air Force aircraft have flown to Uzbekistan since the fall of Kabul, and 585 aircrew are seeking asylum there.

22 August
The US Department of Defense activates the Civil Reserve Air Fleet and requisitions 18 airliners from US civil airlines to shuttle Afghanistan evacuees from temporary staging bases outside of that country, freeing US military transport crews to concentrate on the Kabul airlift.

30 August
The last US C-17 flight leaves Kabul Airport just before midnight, ending the US military airlift and the War in Afghanistan.
Raytheon Technologies subsidiary Collins Aerospace announces the acquisition of flight tracking company FlightAware.

=== September ===
4 September
Philippine Airlines, the oldest commercial airline in Asia, files for bankruptcy amid mounting debts due to the COVID-19 pandemic.

9 September
A Qatar Airways Boeing 777-300ER operates the first commercial international flight into Kabul since the US pullout on 30 August.

15 September
An experimental electric aircraft aiming for air speed records, the Rolls-Royce ACCEL completes its first flight in fifteen minutes.

23 September
South African Airways is relaunched after suspending flights for 18 months due to business rescue. A partnership between Takatso Consortium and the Government of South Africa revived the airline with an infusion of R 3 billion (equal to US$200 million).

24 September
The US Air Force awards $2.6 billion to Rolls-Royce Corporation to re-engine the B-52H bomber with 608 F130 engines (the Rolls-Royce BR725 military designation) to replace the outdated TF33, to be integrated by Boeing from 2025 to 2035 and to be operated until at least 2050, increasing fuel efficiency, range, and reducing maintenance costs.

=== October ===
4 October
Gulfstream introduces the 4,200 nmi (7,778 km) range G400, to be delivered from 2025, and the 8,000 nmi (14,816 km) range G800, with deliveries from 2023.

8 October
Air India, along with its low cost carrier Air India Express and fifty percent of AISATS, a ground handling company, were sold to Tata Sons.

15 October
Alitalia, the flag carrier of Italy, ceases operations after 74 years due to the impact of the COVID-19 pandemic on aviation following years of losses. Its operations and assets are handed over to new state-owned flag carrier ITA Airways.

19 October
In the 2021 Houston MD-87 crash, a McDonnell Douglas MD-87 charter flight crashes on takeoff from Houston Executive Airport. All 21 people on board survive but a post-crash fire destroys the aircraft.

=== November ===
8 November
After 20 months of restrictions, the United States opens up fully to travellers. This is celebrated when the first two flights back into the US from the United Kingdom, two Airbus A350-1000s operated by British Airways and Virgin Atlantic, conduct a parallel take-off from London Heathrow Airport for the US.

14 to 18 November
Dubai Airshow 2021 is held at Al Maktoum International Airport in Dubai, from 14 to 18 November 2021.

15 November
At the Dubai Airshow, US lessor Air Lease Corporation became the A350F freighter launch customer with an order for seven to be delivered around 2026, among other Airbus airliners.

22 November
Hi Fly lands an Airbus A340-300 in Antarctica, at the Wolfs Fang Runway after a flight from Cape Town, setting the record for the largest aircraft ever to land in Antarctica.

23 November
The single turboprop Beechcraft Denali makes its first flight, targeting certification for 2023.

=== December ===
3 December
During a Middle East tour by French president Emmanuel Macron, the United Arab Emirates signs for 80 examples of the Dassault Rafale F4 multirole fighter to be delivered between 2027 and 2031, a deal valued at €14 billion for the aircraft (€175M each) and €2 billion for weapons.

10 December
The first Airbus Helicopters H160 is delivered to All Nippon Helicopter for electronic news gathering, starting in 2022.

16 December
The 251st and last Airbus A380 is delivered to its main customer Emirates.

== Deadliest crash ==
The deadliest crash of this year was Sriwijaya Air Flight 182, a Boeing 737 which crashed shortly after takeoff from Jakarta, Indonesia on 9 January killing all 62 people on board.
