= Khairil =

Khairil is a given name. Notable people with the name include:

- Khairil Anwar (born 1997), Indonesian footballer
- Khairil Nizam Khirudin (born 1979), Malaysian politician
- Khairil Abdul Rahman (born 1972), Bruneian naval officer
- Khairil Shahme Suhaimi (born 1993), Bruneian footballer
