= Spry Serudi =

Bruneian naval officer (born 1970)

First Admiral (Retired) Dato Seri Pahlawan Spry Serudi PSPNB SMB PSB PJK
- سڤري سرود
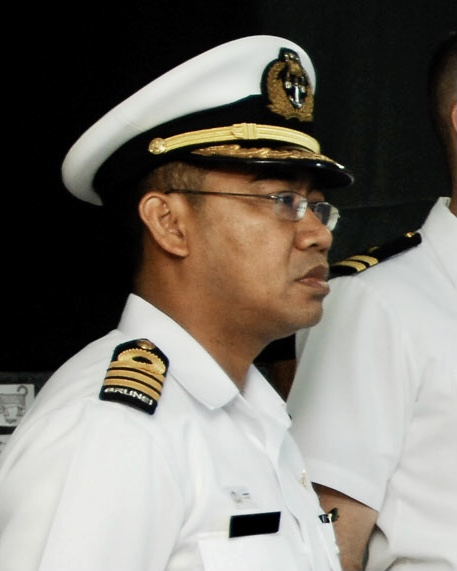
- Lieutenant colonel Spry during CARAT 2009

12th Commander of the Royal Brunei Navy
- In office 31 December 2020 – 30 December 2022
- Monarch: Hassanal Bolkiah
- Deputy: Mohamad Sarif Pudin
- Preceded by: Othman Suhaili
- Succeeded by: Mohamad Sarif Pudin (Acting)

Personal details
- Born: 25 March 1970 (age 56) Brunei
- Spouse: Haslinda Hamid
- Children: 5
- Education: Britannia Royal Naval College; National Defence University
- Profession: Naval officer

Military service
- Allegiance: Brunei
- Branch/service: Royal Brunei Navy
- Years of service: 1990–2022
- Rank: First Admiral
- Commands: KDB Pemburu (P-15); KDB Perwira (P-14); KDB Seteria (P-04); KDB Waspada (P-02); Royal Brunei Navy Fleet; International Monitoring Team; Royal Brunei Navy

Spry bin Haji Serudi @ Seruji (born 25 March 1970), also referred to as Dato Spry, is a Bruneian military officer whom formerly took office as the twelfth commander of the Royal Brunei Navy (RBN) from 2020 to 2022. He is the first naval officer in charge of the International Monitoring Team (IMT) contingent from Brunei from 2012 to 2013.

== Education ==
Spry took a number of courses abroad while in his early years of service, including the International Sub-Lieutenant Course in the United Kingdom in 1992, the International Communication Officers' Course in the United Kingdom in 1998, the International Principal Warfare Officer Course in the United Kingdom in 2001, the Overseas Joint Warfare Course in Australia in 2003, the Command and Staff Course in New Zealand in 2005, the Executive Development Programme (EDP), and the International Maritime Organization Course, International Maritime Organisation Course in Oil Spill Response in 2006, International Intelligence Fellows Program in United States in 2010 and the National Security and War Course (NSWC) at National Defence University (NDU) Pakistan in 2016.

== Military career ==
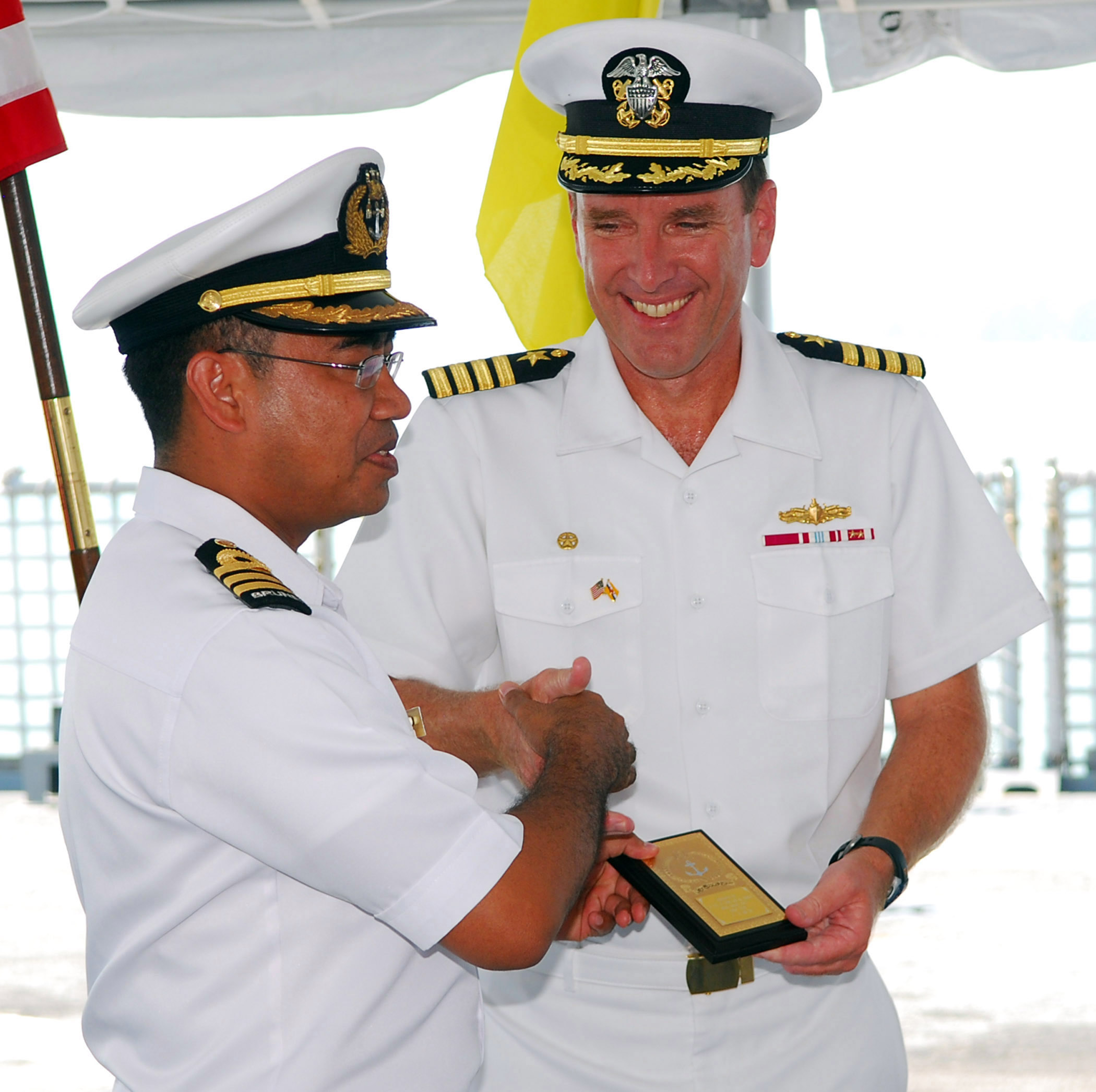
Lieutenant colonel Spry presents a plaque to Capt. William Kearns III during CARAT 2009

Spry enlisted in the Royal Brunei Armed Forces (RBAF) in September 1989 and was subsequently posted to the RBN as a naval cadet in April 1990. He later enrolled in the international midshipman program at Britannia Royal Naval College in Dartmouth, United Kingdom where he eventually earned his degree in 1991. He has held a number of command positions, including commanding officer of the missile gunboats KDB Seteria (P-04) and KDB Waspada (P-02), commanding officer of the coastal patrol crafts KDB Pemburu (P-15) and KDB Perwira (P-14), and assumed the positions of squadron commander in 2003 and RBN Fleet Commander in 2016. Notably, he made a contribution to regional peace in Mindanao, Philippines, in 2012 while serving as the Brunei Darussalam International Monitoring Team's (IMT) Head. The group led by Ismaon Zainie has been replaced by him, the first naval officer to lead the Brunei IMT force.

In 2008, Spry served as commanding officer of Naval Training, and in 2014, the Prime Minister's Office (PMO) seconded him to the National Security Committee secretariat and the National Maritime Coordination Centre. He also held a variety of staff positions. Before taking on his present role as commander of the RBN on 31 December 2020, he was appointed in June 2018 as the Chief of Staff of the RBAF from 2018 to 2020. He chaired the virtual 15th ASEAN Navy Chiefs’ Meeting on 11 August 2021.

During his introduction trip to Singapore from 29 March to 1 April 2022, Spry visited Lt. Gen. Melvyn Ong and looked at the guard of honour at MINDEF. He stopped by Changi Naval Base, where he met with Aaron Beng and received a briefing on the capabilities and operations of the Sentinel-class maritime security and response vessels (MSRV) of the Republic of Singapore Navy (RSN) on the MSRV Bastion. The deep and long-standing bilateral defense ties between Singapore and Brunei are highlighted by his visit.

From 6 to 8 November 2022, Yokosuka, Japan, hosted the 18th Western Pacific Naval Symposium (WPNS) and International Fleet Review (IFR) 2022, in which Dato Spry served as head of delegation. Because of RBN's first-ever deployment to Japan to attend IFR 2022, which will mark the 70th anniversary of the Japan Maritime Self-Defense Force (JMSDF).

A parade commander presided over a farewell parade ceremony for Dato Spry at the Muara Naval Base's Parade Square on 30 December 2022. The departing RBN Commander was greeted with an honorary salute as he arrived at Parade Square and was shown the RBN personnel who made up the guard of honour. He gave a last address as the event progressed.

== Personal life ==
Spry is married to Datin Haslinda binti Haji Hamid, and together they have five children; 3 sons and 2 daughters. He enjoys jogging, hiking, and golf.

== Honours ==
Spry has earned the following honours;

National

- Order of Pahlawan Negara Brunei First Class (PSPNB; 15 July 2021) – Dato Seri Pahlawan
- Order of Setia Negara Brunei Fourth Class (PSB)
- Order of Seri Paduka Mahkota Brunei Third Class (SMB)
- Meritorious Service Medal (PJK)
- Sultan of Brunei Golden Jubilee Medal (5 October 2017)
- General Service Medal (Armed Forces)
- Royal Brunei Armed Forces Golden Jubilee Medal (31 May 2011)
- Royal Brunei Armed Forces Diamond Jubilee Medal (31 May 2021)

Foreign

- Singapore:
  - Pingat Jasa Gemilang (Tentera) (PJG; 18 October 2022)

Military offices
Preceded by Othman Suhaili	12th Commander of the Royal Brunei Navy; 31 December 2020 – 30 December 2022	Succeeded by Mohamad Sarif Pudin (Acting)
Preceded by Ismaon Zainie	Head of the 9th Brunei Darussalam International Monitoring Team; 2012–2013	Succeeded by Khairil Ismail
