= Mohamad Sarif Pudin =

Bruneian naval officer (born 1972)

Captain Mohamad Sarif Pudin SNB SMB PJK PIKB
- محمد ساريف ڤودين
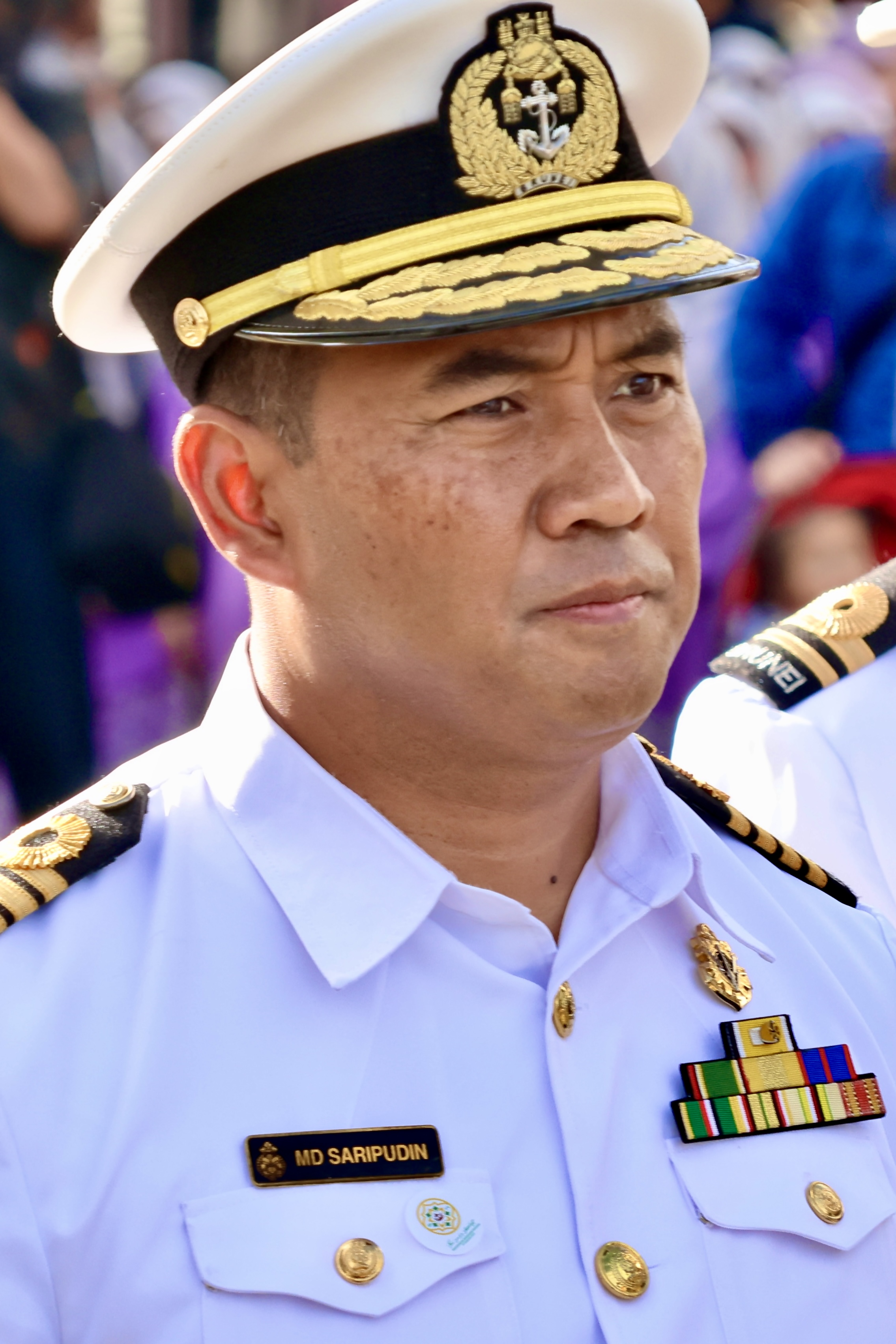
- Captain Mohamad Sarif Pudin in 2023

13th Commander of the Royal Brunei Navy
- Acting
- In office 30 December 2022 – 10 January 2025
- Monarch: Hassanal Bolkiah
- Deputy: Khairil Abdul Rahman
- Preceded by: Spry Serudi
- Succeeded by: Sahibul Bahari

Personal details
- Born: 26 December 1972 (age 53) Brunei
- Spouse: Suzana Adenan
- Children: 2
- Education: University of Hertfordshire; Britannia Royal Naval College
- Profession: Naval officer

Military service
- Allegiance: Brunei
- Branch/service: Royal Brunei Navy
- Years of service: 1990–present
- Rank: Captain
- Unit: Logistic RBN
- Commands: Directorate of Logistic; Support Services; Royal Brunei Navy Fleet; Royal Brunei Navy

Mohamad Sarif Pudin bin Matserudin (born 26 December 1972), or simply known as Md Saripudin, is a Bruneian naval officer who served as the acting commander of the Royal Brunei Navy (RBN) from 2023 to 2025.

== Military career ==
On 26 June 1990, Mohamad Sarif Pudin enlisted in the Boys Company as a recruit, belonging to the 11th Intake. After graduating from the University of Hertfordshire in July 1996, he spent the following year at Britannia Royal Naval College in Dartmouth, United Kingdom, attending the Naval Young Officer Course. He began his career with the RBN as a weapons engineer, with service number 488. In February 1997, he was promoted to lieutenant (junior grade) and became an officer cadet. He took part in a number of professional courses overseas over his career, including the Weapon System Engineering Management Course in 1998, the Engineering Organization T.Q. Workshop in 2000, and the Bridge Resource Management course in 2005. In addition, he has a military master's degree in 2010, and a bachelor's degree in engineering. Additionally, he attended the Lee Kuan Yew Senior Fellowship in Public Service Program's Third Series in 2021.

Over the course of his career, Mohamad Sarif Pudin has held a number of staff and command positions. These positions include Chief Logistic Officer in 2010, Base Commander in 2011, Officer Commanding Naval Technical Training School in 2006, Weapon Engineering Officer in 1998, and Fleet Engineering Officer in 2005. At Ministry of Defence (MINDEF) Headquarters, he was named Staff Officer Grade 1 Logistic in 2013 and Staff Officer Grade 1 Admin in 2018.

From 2014 until 2017, Mohamad Sarif Pudin was also Brunei's defence attaché in China. During this time, he actively participated in the formation of the Beijing Military Attaché Corps (BMAC), which strengthened defence diplomacy between Brunei and China. After serving as chairman of the Asia–Pacific region, he was named BMAC social coordinator. He was committed to fostering closer ties between the People's Liberation Army (PLA) and the Royal Brunei Armed Forces (RBAF) as well as other armed forces. Before his tour in China came to a conclusion in December 2017, he received the Commemorative Medal in appreciation of his achievements.

In 2019, Mohamad Sarif Pudin returned to RBN. Khairil Abdul Rahman succeeded him as the Fleet Commander of RBN on 12 October 2020, at the Fleet Headquarters. On 22 January 2021, at the Support Services Headquarters, his position of Commandant of Support Services was succeeded by Suhailee Pungut. From January 2021 until January 2023, he served as the Deputy Commander RBN until assuming the role of Acting Commander RBN. Under his leadership in 2023, KDB As-Siddiq and KDB Al-Faruq, two former Republic of Singapore Navy (RSN) Fearless-class patrol vessels, were successfully turned over and commissioned into the RBN. He also saw numerous significant foreign vessel visits, including those of Qi Jiguang, INS Kiltan (P30) and USS Blue Ridge (LCC-19).

From 2–5 May 2023, at the Changi Exhibition Centre, he attended the International Maritime Defence Exhibition and Conference (IMDEX) Asia 2023. In the Naval War College in the United States, he represented the RBN in the 25th International Seapower Symposium (ISS) on 19–22 September 2023. On 25 January 2024, Admiral Samuel Paparo hosted the 9th Multilateral Maritime Virtual Key Leaders Engagement (KLE), which Mohamad Sarif Pudin attended. On 16–19 March 2024, he welcomed the ships of the Royal Thai Navy (RTN), specifically HTMS Taksin, HTMS Bhumibol Adulyadej, and HTMS Kraburi.

== Personal life ==
Mohamad Sarif Pudin married Dr. Hajah Dayang Suzana binti Haji Awang Adenan, and together they have 2 daughters. He likes to read, hike and golf.

== Honours ==
Mohamad Sarif Pudin has earned the following honours;

National

- Order of Setia Negara Brunei Third Class (SNB; 15 July 2025)
- Order of Seri Paduka Mahkota Brunei Third Class (SMB)
- Excellent Service Medal (PIKB; 2018)
- Meritorious Service Medal (PJK)
- Sultan of Brunei Golden Jubilee Medal (5 October 2017)
- General Service Medal
- Long Service Medal and Good Conduct (PKLPB; 2013)
- Royal Brunei Armed Forces Golden Jubilee Medal (31 May 2011)
- Royal Brunei Armed Forces Diamond Jubilee Medal (31 May 2021)

Foreign

- China:
  - Commemorative Medal (2017)

Military offices
Preceded by Spry Serudi	Acting Commander of the Royal Brunei Navy; 30 December 2022 – 10 January 2025	Succeeded by Sahibul Bahari
Preceded by Mohamad Damit	Deputy Commander of the Royal Brunei Navy; January 2021 – January 2023	Succeeded by Khairil Abdul Rahman
Preceded by Norshahrinizam Talib	Fleet Commander of the Royal Brunei Navy; 12 October 2020 – 12 October 2020	Succeeded by Khairil Abdul Rahman
