= Richard G. Colbert =

United States Navy admiral (1915–1973)

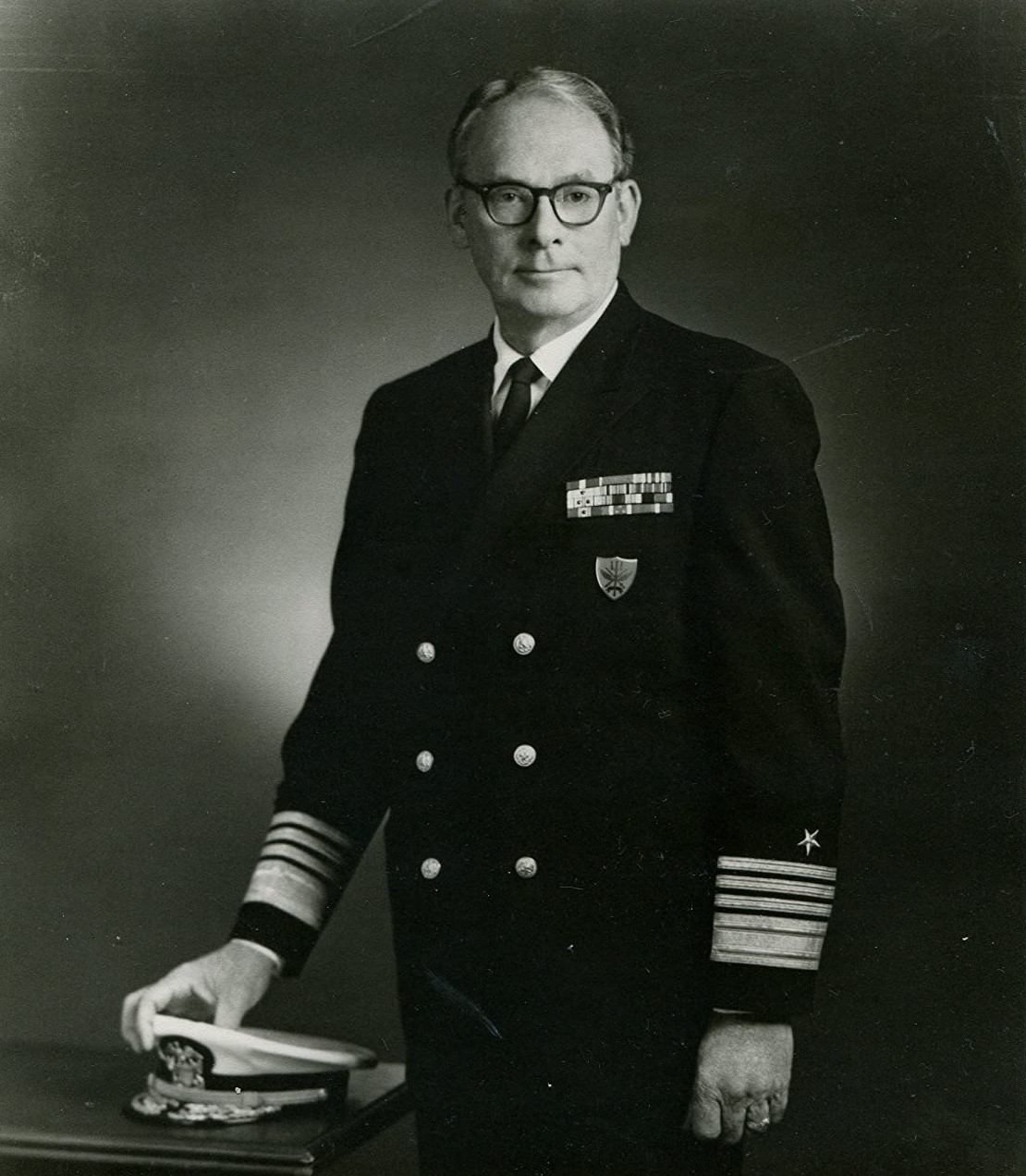
- Born: February 12, 1915; Brownsville, Pennsylvania, U.S.
- Died: December 2, 1973 (aged 58); Bethesda, Maryland, U.S.
- Burial place: Arlington National Cemetery
- Military career
- Branch: United States Navy
- Service years: 1937–1973
- Rank: Admiral
- Nickname: "Mr. International Navy"
- Commands: Allied Forces Southern Europe
- Conflicts: World War II
- Awards: Distinguished Service Medal (2); Legion of Merit; Joint Service Commendation Medal

Richard Gary Colbert (February 12, 1915 – December 2, 1973) was a four-star admiral in the United States Navy who served as President of the Naval War College from 1968 to 1971, and as commander in chief of all NATO forces in southern Europe from 1972 to 1973. He was nicknamed "Mr. International Navy" as one of the very few senior admirals in the U.S. Navy identified with international naval cooperation during the Cold War.

== Early career ==
Born in Brownsville, Pennsylvania to Charles F. Colbert, Jr., president of the Pittsburgh Metallurgical Company, and the former Marie Louise Benford, he attended Shady Side Academy in Pittsburgh, Pennsylvania, before being appointed to the United States Naval Academy by Congressman Harry A. Estep in 1933. He graduated from the Naval Academy in June 1937 as one of the four midshipmen officers appointed to command a battalion of the Naval Academy regiment for that academic year, with a class rank of 247/331.

=== World War II ===
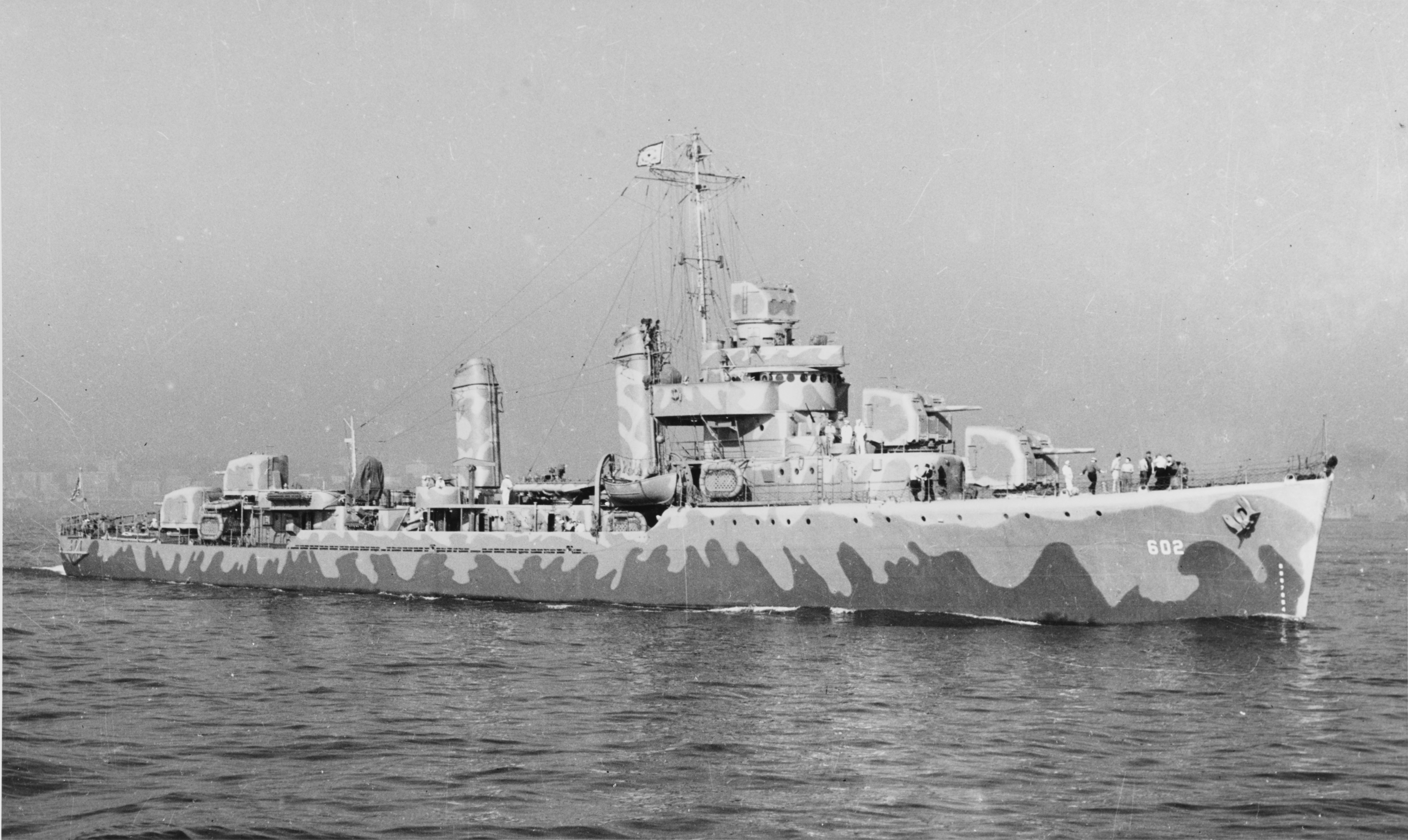
USS Meade (DD-602)

Commissioned ensign, he served aboard the aircraft carrier Yorktown from its commissioning on September 30, 1937, until 1939, when he was assigned to the destroyer Barker in the Asiatic Fleet. He remained aboard Barker for the next five years, rising from junior ensign to lieutenant commander and commanding officer.

Following the Japanese attack on Pearl Harbor, Barker operated with the American-British-Dutch-Australian Command (ABDACOM) in Southeast Asian and Australian waters until May 1942, then escorted convoys between San Francisco, California, and Pearl Harbor, Hawaii, until May 1943, when the destroyer transferred to the Atlantic Fleet to join Task Group 21.12, a hunter-killer group centered on the escort carrier Core.

In 1944, he assumed command of the destroyer Meade, operating with the Pacific Fleet. After the war, Meade was sent on a relief sweep along Tonkin Gulf coastal areas to assist French forces in combating Chinese pirates off Haiphong. Promoted to commander, Colbert spent the next two and a half years as personnel planning officer in the Bureau of Naval Personnel, where he helped plan the postwar naval reserve and served as a social aide in the White House.

=== Postwar ===
In June 1948 he was sent to London as aide and flag secretary to Admiral Richard L. Conolly, Commander in Chief, U.S. Naval Forces, Eastern Atlantic and Mediterranean (CINCNELM). A superb negotiator, Conolly left a deep impression on Colbert, whose later work on international naval cooperation would be founded on the lessons he learned by watching Conolly interact with allied naval leaders. When Conolly's tour as CINCNELM ended in December 1950, Colbert briefly accompanied Conolly to the admiral's new posting as president of the Naval War College in Newport, Rhode Island.

Colbert's next assignment was in the Politico-Military Affairs Division in the Office of the Chief of Naval Operations (OP-35), where he helped establish the naval commands in the newly created NATO alliance and quickly developed a reputation for familiarity with allied problems and ability to deal with foreign governments. In 1951, Chief of Naval Operations Forrest P. Sherman selected Colbert to be his aide later in the year, in the meantime tapping Colbert for temporary duty as Sherman's special assistant during overseas trips. In July 1951, Colbert accompanied Sherman to Spain to negotiate naval basing with General Francisco Franco. Shortly after the meeting, Sherman suddenly died of a heart attack. With no written record of Sherman's conversations with Franco, it fell to Colbert to debrief the late admiral's negotiations to the Navy Department and other government agencies.

From 1953 to 1955, Colbert was executive officer of the heavy cruiser Albany, which served as flagship for Commander, Battleship-Cruiser Force, Atlantic, and was deployed to the Mediterranean. Vice Admiral Robert H. Rice, his former commanding officer, remembered Colbert as "the best executive officer any ship had had (or the good fortune to have)."

Promoted to captain in 1955, Colbert was offered a choice between assignment as head of an academic section at the Naval Academy or as a student at the Naval War College. On Conolly's advice, Colbert opted for the Naval War College and was enrolled in the naval warfare 1 course. By January 1956 he had been selected to remain for a second academic year as a student in the naval warfare 2 course, but was reassigned that spring to become the first director of a new Naval War College course for international naval officers.

=== Naval command course ===
Students and staff of the first naval command course, September 8, 1956. Colbert is second from right in back row.

In the spring of 1956, Chief of Naval Operations Arleigh A. Burke assigned Colbert to organize and direct a new course at the Naval War College for senior naval officers from allied and friendly nations. Said Burke, "I had already learned that the CNO could not just give an order and expect to have it carried out. He had to get somebody who was in agreement with the project, who was just as enthusiastic about it, who was capable of running it without supervision, who could get things done, and who could use the authority delegated him wisely to take charge of the project. That man was Dick Colbert."

During his tour in the Office of the Chief of Naval Operations, Colbert had worked closely with Burke as one of Burke's action officers when Burke was director of the Plans Division, and Burke remembered Colbert's unusual competence in international relations. Moreover, during that tour Colbert had actually written a brief staff study on the best way to educate foreign naval officers at Navy service schools without compromising either national security or the level of their instruction. Based on that four-year-old study, Colbert spent the summer of 1956 preparing for the arrival of students from up to 30 countries in August. To avoid using the word "foreign", he selected the title "Naval Command Course for Free World Naval Officers."

Colbert served as director of the naval command course for its first two classes. Students generally attended the regular Naval War College lectures for the naval warfare 1 course, and took field trips during lectures dealing with classified topics such as nuclear operations. Colbert leveraged his extensive personal contacts to arrange visits to military and naval sites, as well as industrial plants in Buffalo, New York, and the New York Stock Exchange. Colbert and his wife also spent a considerable amount of their own money to organize social events to foster lasting informal ties between students, whose personal bonding was viewed as almost as important as the formal curriculum. Colbert was impressed by the high quality of the inaugural class, writing, "The capability of the students is far beyond our expectations—they really look like the 'future CNO's of the Free World' as Admiral Burke describes them."

=== Major command ===
After three years at the Naval War College, Colbert was assigned to the Long Range Plans and Basic War Plans Branch of the Joint Staff. In 1960 he became commanding officer of the Sixth Fleet's general stores ship Altair, based in Barcelona, Spain, where he helped pioneer the use of helicopters for vertical replenishment of supplies for ships at sea.

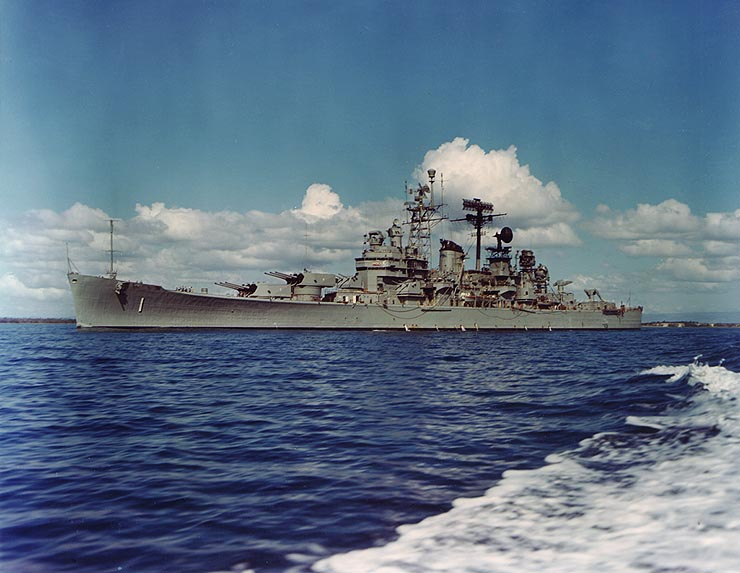
USS Boston (CAG-1)

Selected for major command, Colbert requested "a cruiser out of Boston," which resulted in his being assigned as captain of the guided missile cruiser Boston from October 1961 to February 1963. During his tour, Boston deployed to the Mediterranean and briefly hosted the commander of the Sixth Fleet, Vice Admiral David L. McDonald, who recalled that "Colbert and his crew in the Boston went out of their way to make their ship a most outstanding flagship."

While commanding Boston, Colbert applied for one of the two military billets on the Policy Planning Council (PPC) of the Department of State, a long-range planning and advisory staff tasked with analyzing major foreign policy problems and coordinating political-military policy and interagency planning. The Navy had never sent an officer to the PPC, and Colbert's detailing officer in the Bureau of Naval Personnel warned him repeatedly that an assignment to the State Department would irreparably damage his career, but Colbert persisted, passing an interview with Director of Policy Planning Walt W. Rostow and recruiting support from Assistant Secretary of Defense for International Security Affairs Paul H. Nitze, a former PPC chairman whose aide Elmo R. Zumwalt, Jr., "pulled the necessary levers."

During his time on the PPC, Colbert worked on topics ranging from the Vietnam War, various proposals for multilateral forces, and nuclear weapons arrangements east of the Suez Canal. In May 1964, midway through his two-year tour, he was one of five in his class selected for rear admiral. Indicating its newfound appreciation for the importance of Colbert's work, the Navy had him complete his scheduled term on the PPC instead of immediately transferring him to a traditional flag-level command. For his service on the PPC, he was awarded the Joint Service Commendation Medal.

== Flag officer ==
In June 1964 he was assigned as Commander Cruiser-Destroyer Flotilla 6 (COMCRUDESFLOT SIX), based in Charleston, South Carolina, and assumed command in 1965. With about fifty ships under his command, the position was equivalent to being commander in chief of a small navy.

From June 1966 to August 1968 he served as deputy chief of staff and assistant chief of staff for policy, plans and operations to Admiral Thomas H. Moorer, Supreme Allied Commander Atlantic (SACLANT), for which he received the Legion of Merit. His first assignment on the SACLANT staff was to establish Iberian Atlantic Command (IBERLANT), a Portuguese-led command responsible for covering the sea approaches to the Strait of Gibraltar. Said Moorer, "This action not only significantly enhanced the capability of NATO to deal with naval operations in the area, but also significantly increased the morale, prestige and overall interest of the Portuguese allies. I give Admiral Colbert all of the credit for this important move."

In late November 1966, Colbert prepared a concept paper proposing a permanent SACLANT naval contingency force based on Operation Matchmaker, an annual six-month exercising involving ships from allied navies. The proposed contingency force was approved by NATO in December 1967 and activated in January 1968 as Standing Naval Force Atlantic (STANAVFORLANT).

=== President of the Naval War College ===
As President of the Naval War College (second from left), with superintendents of the Naval Academy and Naval Postgraduate School, 1969

In July 1968, Colbert was unexpectedly selected to be President of the Naval War College and promoted to vice admiral ahead of ten classmates. He replaced Vice Admiral John T. Hayward, who had specifically recommended Colbert as his ideal successor. As a relatively young rear admiral who was expected to rise much further in the Navy after his presidency, Colbert's appointment broke the postwar tradition of selecting an "elder statesman" on the verge of retirement. A pleased Colbert remarked, "It is a dream come true—a dream that I would never have mentioned to anyone, for fear of being precocious."

During his presidency, which lasted from August 30, 1968, until August 17, 1971, Colbert consolidated his predecessor's curricular reforms and expanded the civilian and military faculty. He also continued the Naval War College building program, working with Rhode Island Senator John O. Pastore to secure congressional funding for new student housing and other construction projects. In collaboration with sculptor Felix de Weldon and National Gallery of Art director J. Carter Brown, he completed the design of three new buildings—Spruance Hall, Conolly Hall, and Hewitt Hall—for which he arranged to reopen the old quarry in Medford, Massachusetts, to obtain the same granite that had been used to construct the adjacent buildings, so that the new buildings would eventually weather to the same color.

Other lasting contributions included the creation of the Naval War College Foundation; the Naval Staff College, an international program for middle-grade officers; and the International Seapower Symposium, a biennial conference for international flag officers whose first meeting, hosted at the Naval War College in 1969, was attended by chiefs of naval staff and senior officers from 37 navies.

=== Commander in Chief, Allied Forces Southern Europe ===
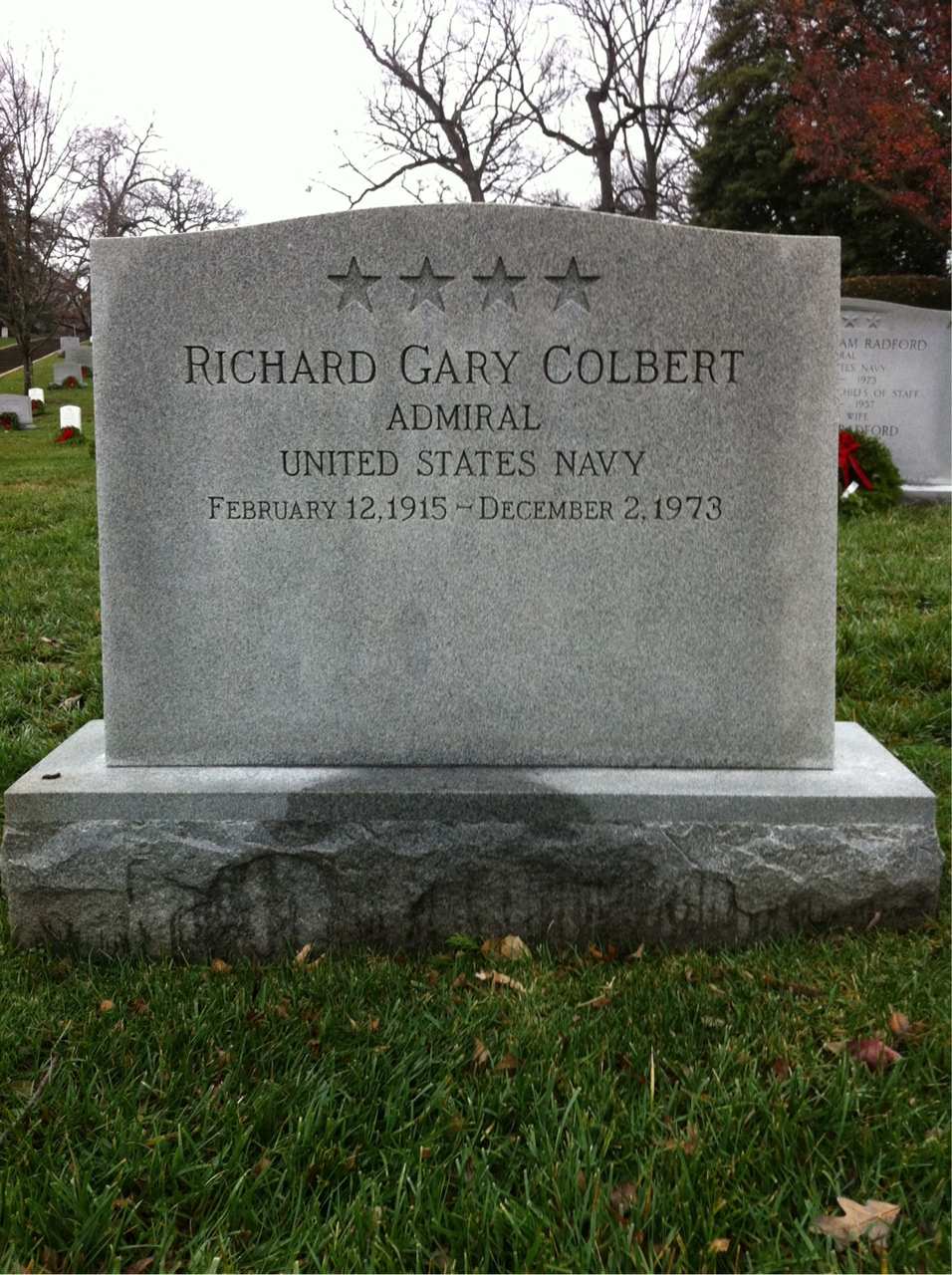
Grave at Arlington National Cemetery

After leaving the Naval War College in June 1971, Colbert spent a year as SACLANT chief of staff before being promoted to full admiral and appointed Commander in Chief, Allied Forces Southern Europe (CINCSOUTH) in June 1972.

As CINCSOUTH, Colbert's principal concern was to reduce the tension between Greece and Turkey. He reconstituted the Naval On-Call Force Mediterranean (NAVOCFORMED) using Greek, Turkish, Italian, British, and U.S. ships. He also negotiated a treaty with France, which had withdrawn its armed forces from NATO in 1966, to allow annual naval exercises, culminating in a combined Franco-American naval exercise off the coast of the United States in 1973. Chief of Naval Operations Elmo R. Zumwalt, Jr. rated Colbert "one of our most outstanding NATO commanders" due to the decades-long personal relationships he maintained with the alumni of the naval command course, many of whom had become high-ranking flag officers in their respective navies. Zumwalt dubbed Colbert "Mr. International Navy" for his reputation as one of the very few senior admirals in the U.S. Navy identified with international naval cooperation.

In early 1973 Colbert was diagnosed with cancer and was operated on unsuccessfully. Realizing his illness was terminal, he secured Zumwalt's permission to return to his command and serve as long as he could. "I am a realist and know that I am on borrowed time," Colbert wrote his chaplain. "I am convinced that the Lord has decided to give me some extra time to do some things in this, my last command, which might better insure a safer world. That is the gist of my prayers. All I ask is just a bit more time to carry on and establish some concepts—multinational NATO forces which will strengthen our Free World against what I am convinced is a desperate threat, despite all the talk of détente."

Colbert was succeeded as CINCSOUTH by Admiral Means Johnston, Jr., and retired from the Navy on November 25, 1973. He died at the Naval Hospital in Bethesda, Maryland on December 2, 1973, at the age of 58, and was buried in Arlington National Cemetery. Italian Admiral Giuseppe Pighini, commander of Allied Naval Forces Southern Europe, eulogized Colbert as "a man dedicated to his duty till the last breath of life."

In his memoirs, Zumwalt wrote admiringly of Colbert's last days:

He performed magnificently throughout his final months and readily agreed to return home when it became apparent that the end was approaching. Within a week from the time he marched proudly off the plane at Andrews Air Force Base in Washington...and after a final chat at Bethesda Naval Hospital during which he instructed me carefully on all the things he wanted me to carry on for him in the NATO command and finally asked me whether or not there was anything more that he could do to help me, Admiral Richard Colbert died, loved and mourned."

== Personal life ==
Colbert married the former Prudence Anne Robertson, daughter of the chairman of The London Express Newspapers Company, on November 15, 1950, in St. Paul's Church, Knightsbridge, London, and they had one daughter and three sons.

Adm. Colbert's decorations include the Distinguished Service Medal, awarded for his service as President of the Naval War College, and a Gold Star denoting a second Distinguished Service Medal, awarded for his service as Commander in Chief, Allied Forces Southern Europe; the Joint Service Commendation Medal, awarded for his service on the Policy Planning Council of the State Department; and the Legion of Merit, awarded for his service as SACLANT deputy chief of staff.

The Admiral Richard G. Colbert Memorial Prize is a cash prize sponsored by the Naval War College Foundation and awarded to the student composing the best essay focusing on a strategic, military, political, economic, legal, or tactical aspect of an appropriate professional topic.

== Awards ==
- Distinguished Service Medal (two awards)
- Legion of Merit
- Joint Service Commendation Medal

== Sources ==
- Hattendorf, John B. (Summer 2008), "Admiral Richard G. Colbert: Pioneer in Building Global Maritime Partnerships" (PDF), Naval War College Review, vol. 61, no. 3
- Hattendorf, John B.; Simpson, B. Mitchell III; Wadleigh, John R. (1984), Sailors and Scholars – The Centennial History of the U.S. Naval War College, Newport, Rhode Island: Naval War College Press
- Sokolsky, Joel J. (1991), The Fraternity of the Blue Uniform: Admiral Richard G. Colbert, U.S. Navy and Allied Naval Cooperation, Newport, Rhode Island: Naval War College Press
- Who's Who In America, vol. 37, Chicago: Marquis Who's Who, 1972–1973
- Wyld, Lionel D. (1999), The Naval War College, Charleston, South Carolina: Arcadia Publishing
- Zumwalt, Elmo R. Jr. (1976), On Watch: A Memoir, New York City, New York: The New York Times Book Company

Military offices
Preceded by John T. Hayward	President of the Naval War College; August 30, 1968–August 17, 1971	Succeeded by Benedict J. Semmes, Jr.
Preceded by Horacio Rivero	Commander in Chief, Allied Forces Southern Europe; June 1972–November 1973	Succeeded by Means Johnston, Jr.
