= Khairil Abdul Rahman =

Bruneian naval officer (born 1975)

Captain Khairil Abdul Rahman PSB SMB PJK PIKB
- خيريل عبدالرحمن
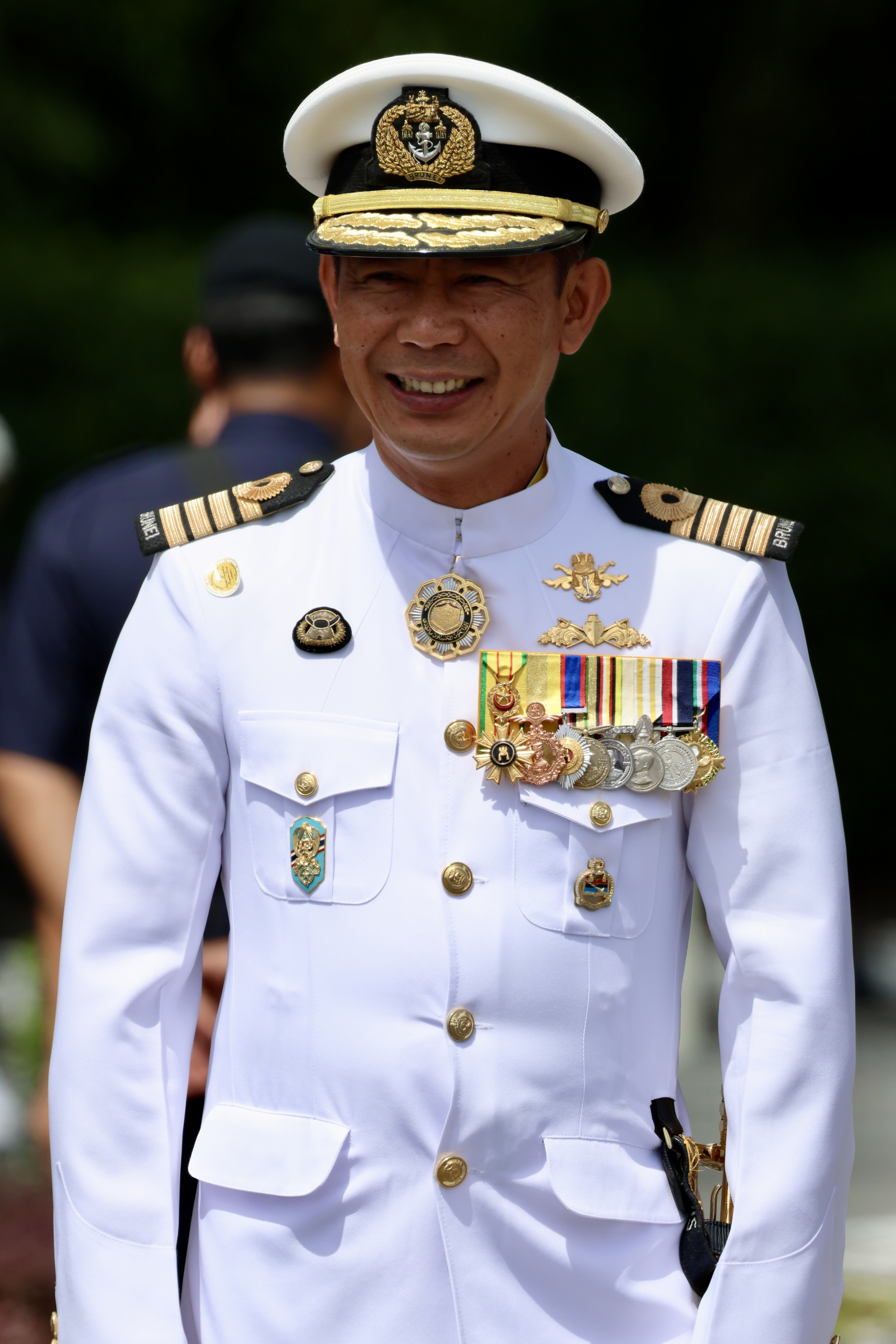
- Captain Khairil in 2024
- Born: Khairil bin Haji Abdul Rahman; 6 July 1975 (age 51); Brunei
- Education: South Devon College (ONC); Britannia Royal Naval College
- Military career
- Allegiance: Brunei
- Branch: Royal Brunei Navy
- Service years: 1991–present
- Rank: Captain
- Commands: Coastal Patrol Craft Squadron; KDB Seteria; KDB Syafaat; KDB Daruttaqwa; KDB Darussalam; Royal Brunei Navy Fleet; Royal Brunei Navy

Khairil bin Haji Abdul Rahman (born 26 December 1972) is a Bruneian naval officer who serve as the current acting Deputy Commander of the Royal Brunei Navy (RBN) since 2023.

== Education ==
On 6 July 1975, Khairil bin Haji Abdul Rahman was born in Brunei. In January 1991, he joined the 13th Intake of the Boys Company, which was part of the Royal Brunei Armed Forces (RBAF). He received a grant from the Business and Technology Education Council (BTEC) to study at South Devon College in Torquay, United Kingdom from 1993 to 1995. He graduated with an Ordinary National Diploma in electrical, electronic, communication, and computer engineering.

In the UK, he completed training in International Sub-lieutenant, International Long Navigation, and International Principal Warfare Officer; in Singapore, he finished courses in Mine Hunting Officer, Anti-Submarine Warfare, and Basic Diving. He participated in the Oil Spill Response Level 3 course, the Bridge Resource Management training, the RBAF Command & Staff training, the Long-Range Identification and Tracking (LRIT), and the RBAF 12th Executive Development Programme locally.

== Military career ==
In August 1995, Khairil joined the RBN as an officer cadet. In April 1998, he received his midshipman degree from Britannia Royal Naval College in Dartmouth, United Kingdom. In 1998, he was promoted to lieutenant (junior grade); in 2003, he became a lieutenant; in 2007, he became a lieutenant commander; and in 2013, he became a commander. During his initial years, he held positions as Coastal Patrol Craft (CPC) and Missile Gun Boat navigation officer, executive officer, and commanding officer. Prior to becoming the RBN navigation officer, he worked at Navy Headquarters as a Staff Officer Grade 3 Admin and Personnel. In addition, he was the Joint Force Headquarters's (JFHQ) Staff Officer Grade 2 Joint Maritime Operation.

In 2003 and 2009, Captain Khairil took part in RBN shipbuilding projects of Nakhoda Ragam-class corvette in Glasgow, and Darussalam-class offshore patrol vessel in Bremen. In 2004, he was appointed as the commanding officer (CO) of KDB Pemburu. In mid-2005, he was appointed CPC Squadron Commander and CO of KDB Perwira. He was commissioned as a principal warfare officer in 2006 and assumed command of KDB Seteria. Following the Bremen project, he was the captain of the KDB Syafaat.

Khairil was the secretariat for the 2013 ADMM–Plus Humanitarian Assistance & Disaster Relief (HADR) and Military Medicine (MM) Exercise, as well as a participant in Exercise Tempest Express in Australia. Later on, he joined the RBN as an exercise controller staff member. He later oversaw KDB Darussalam during Operation Typhoon Haiyan's HADR deployment to Tacloban, in November 2013. Later in 2014, he took part in the Exercise Seagull in Palawan. Then lieutenant colonel, he went back to Bremen in 2014 to commission the KDB Daruttaqwa and then navigated her back to Brunei in the capacity of CO.

Exercise IMDEX in Singapore, in 2015; and Exercise Komodo in Padang, Indonesia, in 2016, he led KDB Daruttaqwa. He was appointed Commandant of Naval Training (CNT) at the Naval Training Centre (NTC) RBN in May 2018 after taking over as RBN Chief of Staff on 20 July 2016. On 10 November 2017, ROKS Dae Jo-yeong (DDH-977) was welcomed by officers and staff of RBN, led by Commander Khairil. He enrolled in the Royal Thai Armed Forces' (RTARF) National Defence College of Thailand from October 2019 to September 2020. After being named Fleet Commander on 12 October 2020, he oversaw a number of missions and improved the capabilities of RBN, including the deployment of UAVs by the Fleet Tactical Aircraft Squadron (FTAS). He was succeeded by Commander Willie Padan as the CNT on 4 December 2020.

In February 2022, Khairil represented the RBN at the Japan Maritime Self-Defense Force (JMSDF)-organised 25th Indo-Pacific Naval College Seminar (IPNCS). From 4–8 June 2023, Makassar hosted the 4th Multilateral Naval Exercise Komodo (MNEK), which he participated in. In Natuna, Indonesia, he oversaw KDB Darulehsan during the inaugural ASEAN Solidarity Exercise in September 2023. He became the Acting Deputy Commander of the RBN on 3 November 2023. He and Mohamad Sarif Pudin participated in the 19th Western Pacific Naval Symposium, which was held in Qingdao, China, from 21 to 25 April 2024. On 6 May 2024, he welcomed the visit of French frigate Vendémiaire.

== Personal life ==
Khairil has two children and a boy with Suryanti binti Haji Mohammad Noor, his wife.

== Honours ==
Captain Khairil Bin Abdul Rahman has earned the following honours;

National

- Order of Setia Negara Brunei Fourth Class (PSB)
- Order of Seri Paduka Mahkota Brunei Third Class (SMB)
- Excellent Service Medal (PIKB; 2018)
- Meritorious Service Medal (PJK)
- Sultan of Brunei Golden Jubilee Medal (5 October 2017)
- General Service Medal
- Royal Brunei Armed Forces Golden Jubilee Medal (31 May 2011)
- Royal Brunei Armed Forces Diamond Jubilee Medal (31 May 2021)

Foreign

- Thailand:
  - King Rama X Coronation Medal (2019)
- United Kingdom:
  - Britannia Medal
- Philippines:
  - Military Civic Action Medal

Military offices
Preceded by Mohamad Sarif Pudin	Acting Deputy Commander of the Royal Brunei Navy; 3 November 2023 – present	Incumbent
Preceded by Mohamad Sarif Pudin	Fleet Commander of the Royal Brunei Navy; 12 October 2020 – 4 December 2020	Succeeded by Sahibul Bahari
