= International Monitoring Team =

Multinational peace process monitor

- Abbreviation: IMT
- Motto: Together We Make it Happen

Agency overview
- Formed: October 2004
- Dissolved: June 2022
- Volunteers: 60

Jurisdictional structure
- Operations jurisdiction: Philippines
- Legal jurisdiction: Mindanao

Operational structure
- Headquarters: Cotabato City, Philippines
- Multinational agency: Philippines
- Nationalities of personnel: 6 countries; Brunei; Indonesia; Japan; Libyan Arab Jamahiriya (2004–2009); Malaysia; Norway; 1 supranational union; European Union

The International Monitoring Team (IMT) was a monitoring team composed of 60 members headquartered in Cotabato City, Mindanao of the Philippines to monitor the implementation of peace between the Government of the Philippines (GPH) and one of the largest rebels in the region, the Moro Islamic Liberation Front (MILF) in the Moro conflict. The team is led by Malaysia, followed by Brunei Darussalam, Indonesia, Japan, Libya, Norway and subsequently the European Union.

== History ==
The IMT was launched in October 2004 by Malaysia together with Brunei and Libya to oversee the situation after the GPH and MILF signed their ceasefire agreement in 2003. In October 2006, Japan began to join the monitoring team. Armed conflict however still resumed and the security situation deteriorated until August 2008 when the national co-ordination surrounding resolutions of pending land problems failed. During the period, the lead was taken by Libya which then rose skepticism from the MILF over the slowing process. Malaysia then decided to withdraw its contingent in November 2008 and the IMT temporarily suspended its activities in 2009. The IMT became active again in February 2010, the same year when Norway began to join the monitoring team. Indonesia also joined the IMT in 2011 after being invited by the Philippines in 2009.

The Moro Islamic Liberation Front would sign the Comprehensive Agreement on the Bangsamoro in 2014. This in turn led to Bangsamoro autonomous region being formed in the southern Philippines in 2019 as part of the peace process. In March 2022, the Philippine government led by President Rodrigo Duterte informed that the IMT that it would no longer extend its mission. The IMT officially left the Philippines in June 2022.

At its peak the IMT had 60 personnel but this figure gradually decreased over time.

== Order of Mission IMT ==
Malaysia

- Malaysian Armed Forces (MAF)
- Royal Malaysia Police (RMP)
- Small team of ministry by civilian personnel
  - Ministry of Defence
  - Ministry of Foreign Affairs

Indonesia

- Indonesian Armed Forces (TNI)
- Indonesian National Police (POLRI)

Brunei

- Royal Brunei Armed Forces (RBAF)
- Royal Brunei Police Force (RBPF)

Libya (2004-2009)

- Libyan Armed Forces

== Roles ==
IMT was responsible in monitoring the security, humanitarian, rehabilitation and development aspects, as well as socio-economic assistance and civilian protection.

== Areas coverage ==
IMT covered the areas of:

- Zamboanga del Norte
- Zamboanga Sibugay
- Zamboanga del Sur
- Maguindanao
- Cotabato
- South Cotabato
- Bukidnon
- Lanao del Norte
- Lanao del Sur
- Sultan Kudarat
- Sarangani
- Davao del Norte
- Compostela Valley
- Davao del Sur
- Davao Oriental
- Basilan
- Sulu
- Tawi-Tawi
- Palawan

== Notable former IMT ==
Notable servicemen who took part in the IMT are:

- General (Retired) Tan Sri Zulkifeli Mohd Zin, former Chief of Defence and Malaysian Army
- General (Retired) Tan Sri Zamrose Mohd Zain, former Chief of Malaysian Army
- Major General (Retired) Dato Paduka Seri Haji Aminuddin Ihsan, former Commander of the Royal Brunei Land Force and Armed Forces
- Brigadier General (Retired) Dato Seri Pahlawan Abdul Razak Abdul Kadir, former Commander of the Royal Brunei Land Force and Deputy Minister of Defence
- First Admiral (Retired) Dato Seri Pahlawan Spry Serudi, former Commander of the Royal Brunei Navy
- Colonel (Retired) Ismaon Zainie, former Chief of Staff of the Joint Force Headquarters of the Royal Brunei Armed Forces
- Colonel (Retired) Azman Bangkol, former Deputy Commander of the Royal Brunei Land Force
- Colonel Muhammad Wata, Deputy Commander of the Royal Brunei Land Force
- Muhyamin Wahab, former member civilian staff IMT of Ministry of Defence (Malaysia) and write his book entitled Debaran Semusim di Cotabato
