= Ismaon Zainie =

Bruneian military officer

Colonel (Retired) Ismaon Zainie PSB SMB PJK PIKB
- محمد اسمااون
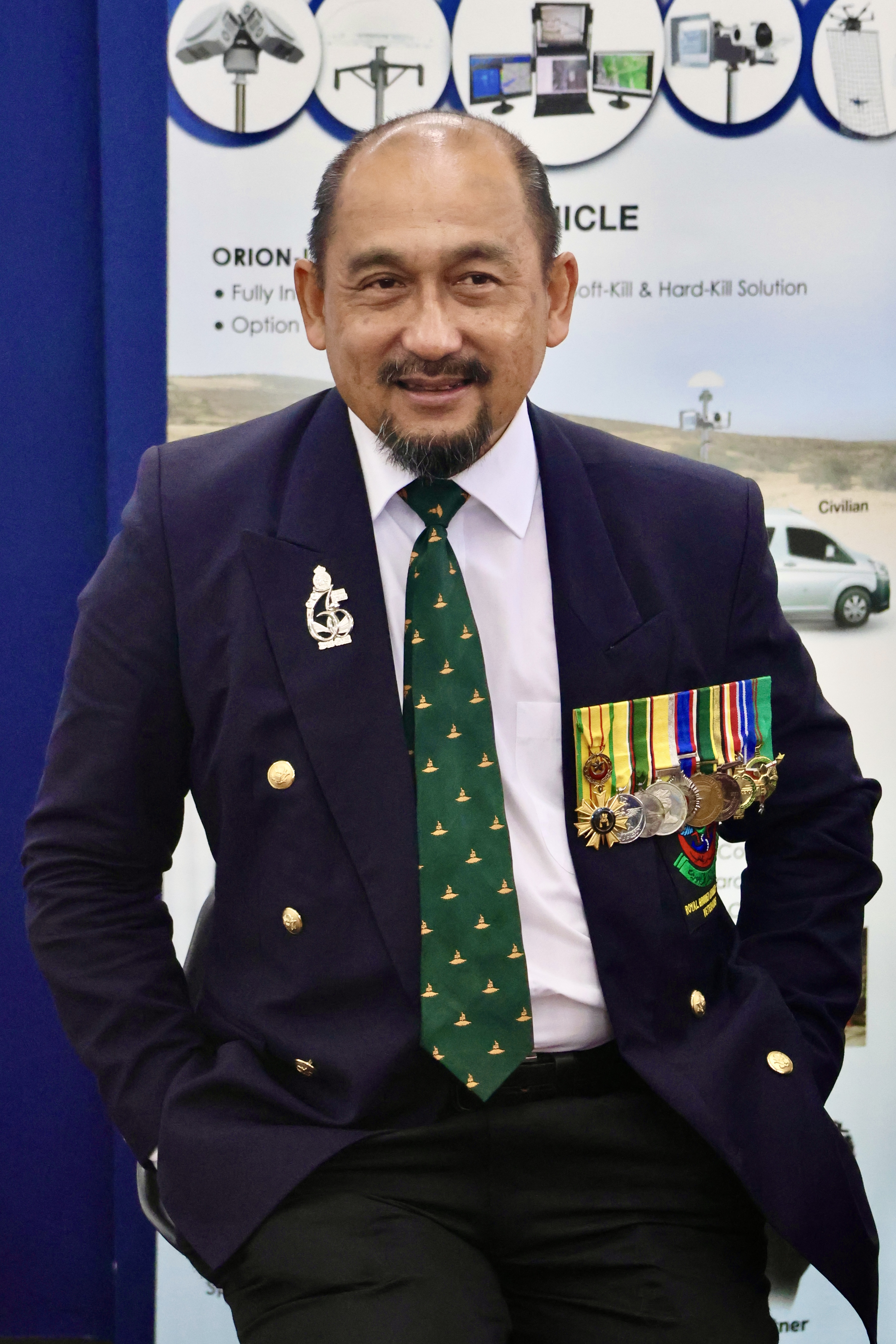
- Mohammad Ismaon in 2024
- Born: Mohammad Ismaon bin Haji Zainie
- Military career
- Allegiance: Brunei
- Branch: Royal Brunei Land Force
- Service years: 1989–2019
- Rank: Colonel
- Service number: 312
- Units: Training Institute RBAF; International Monitoring Team
- Commands: Royal Brunei Malay Reserve Regiment; Defence Capability Development

Mohammad Ismaon bin Haji Zainie is a retired Bruneian military officer who served as the Chief of Staff of the Joint Forces Headquarters of the Royal Brunei Armed Forces (JFHQ RBAF) and the deputy commander of the Training Institute Royal Brunei Armed Forces (TI RBAF). Additionally, he was among the contingent attached to the International Monitoring Team (IMT) in Mindanao.

== Military career ==
In September 1987, Mohammad Ismaon enlisted in the Royal Brunei Armed Forces (RBAF). He received his diploma from the New Zealand Defence Forces' Officer Cadet School in 1989. After that, he traveled to Malaysia and Australia to complete his combat instructor and platoon commander courses. He was given the position of Intake Commander, Recruit Company of TI RBAF, upon his return to Brunei. After serving as an instructor, he was assigned to the Commander of the RBAF as his aide-de-camp.

After that, Mohammad Ismaon went to the Land Warfare Centre in Canungra, Queensland, for his junior staff course, and the Army Training Centre in Malaysia, for his all arms tactics course. In 2003, he received his psc from SAFTI Military Institute's Singapore Command & Staff Course. He was employed by the Ministry of Defence (MINDEF) as a staff officer grade 2 in Operations and Training at Headquarters Royal Brunei Land Force (RBLF). He was appointed chief instructor at the TI RBAF, commanding officer of the Royal Brunei Malay Reserve Regiment (ASMDB), and staff officer grade 1 J5 (Planning) Joint Force Headquarters (JFHQ RBAF) after being promoted to lieutenant colonel in 2007. About 20 June 2008, he served as the RBAF Sports Council's chief-de-mission. On 29 December 2009, the RBAF stated that 11 senior officers, including Mohammad Ismaon, had been granted permission to advance from acting lieutenant colonel to substantive lieutenant colonel with the approval of Sultan Hassanal Bolkiah.

On 31 May 2010, at the Penanjong Garrison for the 49th RBAF anniversary celebration, 1,449 troops from different RBAF units formed the guard of honour under his direction as the parade commander. Lieutenant Colonel Mohammad Ismaon headed of contingent for the 8th RBAF International Monitoring Team (IMT) in Mindanao, Philippines. The Chief of Staff of the Armed Forces of the Philippines (CSAFP) granted him the Bronze Cross Medal and the Military Merit Medal in appreciation of his mission. Following a tour of service in the Philippines with the Moro Islamic Liberation Front (MILF), nine RBAF members from the 8th RBAF IMT IMT made a safe return to their homes. On 10 September 2012, he again led the contingent that landed at Hangar B of the Royal Brunei Air Force Base, Rimba. He would be replaced by Spry Serudi, the first navy officer to head the contingent.

Lieutenant Colonel Mohammad Ismaon returned to Brunei and was reappointed as the acting commander and deputy commander of the TI RBAF. In his capacity as the RBAF Museum's director, he oversaw the museum's formal inauguration on 1 June 2013, which coincided with the RBAF's 52nd anniversary. He was the second defence attaché of the RBAF in Hanoi, Vietnam, from September 2013 to September 2014. In 2016, he studied at the National Defence College (NDC) in Dhaka. He assumed the role of Chief of Staff at JFHQ RBAF upon his return from NDC. In this capacity, he oversaw the joint staff's planning, execution, and maintenance of RBAF operations as well as combined operations with government agencies and joint exercises with other armed forces.

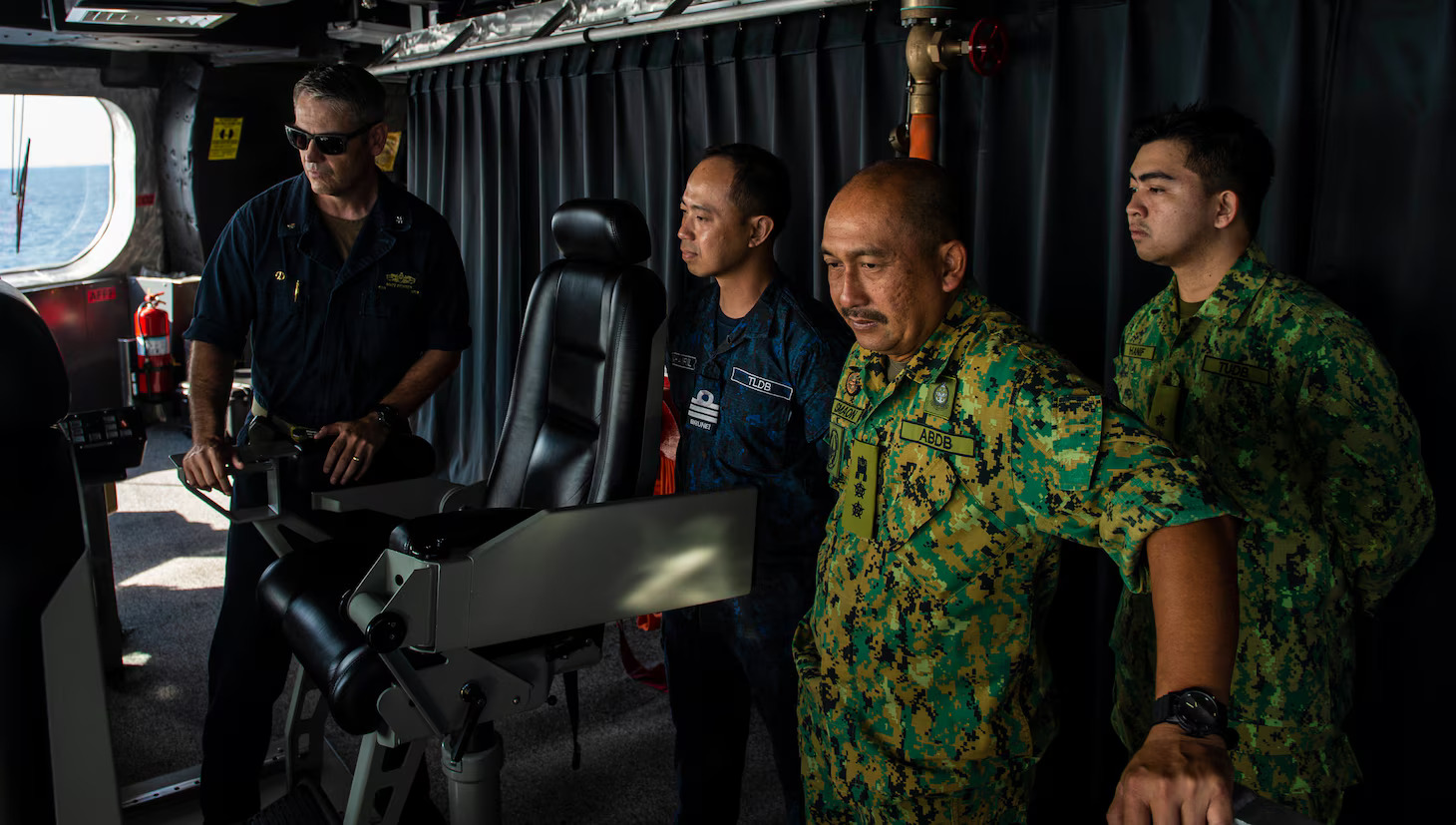
Colonel Mohammad Ismaon aboard USS Montgomery during CARAT 2019

Mohammad Tawih conducted the awarding ceremony at Bolkiah Garrison on 11 January 2018, with Sultan Hassanal Bolkiah's approval. Mohammad Ismaon was promoted to the rank of colonel. Since 2 April 2018, Colonel Mohammad Ismaon has served as the MINDEF's Director of Force Capability Development (FCD). During a passenger transfer on the USS Montgomery (LCS-8) on 30 October 2019, he visited the ship in support of Cooperation Afloat Readiness and Training (CARAT) Brunei. He was one of the officials from Brunei that attended the Defense & Security 2019 event, which takes place every two years in Bangkok, from 18 to 21 November 2019. On 16 December 2019, Pengiran Azmali Mohd Salleh succeeded him as the Director of the Force Capability Development.

== Personal life ==
Mohammad Ismaon has two children from his marriage to Siti Nor'ain binti Dato Paduka Haji Abd Rahim. With a 12-handicap, he likes playing association football, badminton, tennis, and golf.

Mohammad Ismaon took part in the Golf Trophy Challenge, which was organised by the Singapore Armed Forces (SAF) and the RBAF as part of the 2009 Goodwill Sports Senior Interaction Program. On 26 June 2013, the RBAF Golf Club hosted the Inter Services Golf Tournament, in which he represented the TI RBAF.

== Honours ==
Mohammad Ismaon has earned the following honours;

National

- Order of Setia Negara Brunei Fourth Class (PSB)
- Order of Seri Paduka Mahkota Brunei Third Class (SMB)
- Excellent Service Medal (PIKB)
- Meritorious Service Medal (PJK)
- Sultan of Brunei Silver Jubilee Medal (5 October 1992)
- General Service Medal
- Long Service Medal and Good Conduct (PKLPB)
- Royal Brunei Armed Forces Golden Jubilee Medal (31 May 2011)

Foreign

- Philippines:
  - Bronze Cross Medal
  - Military Merit Medal

Military offices
Preceded by Hasmee Abdul Wahab	Head of the 8th Brunei Darussalam International Monitoring Team; 2011–2012	Succeeded by Spry Serudi
