= Brett T. Williams =

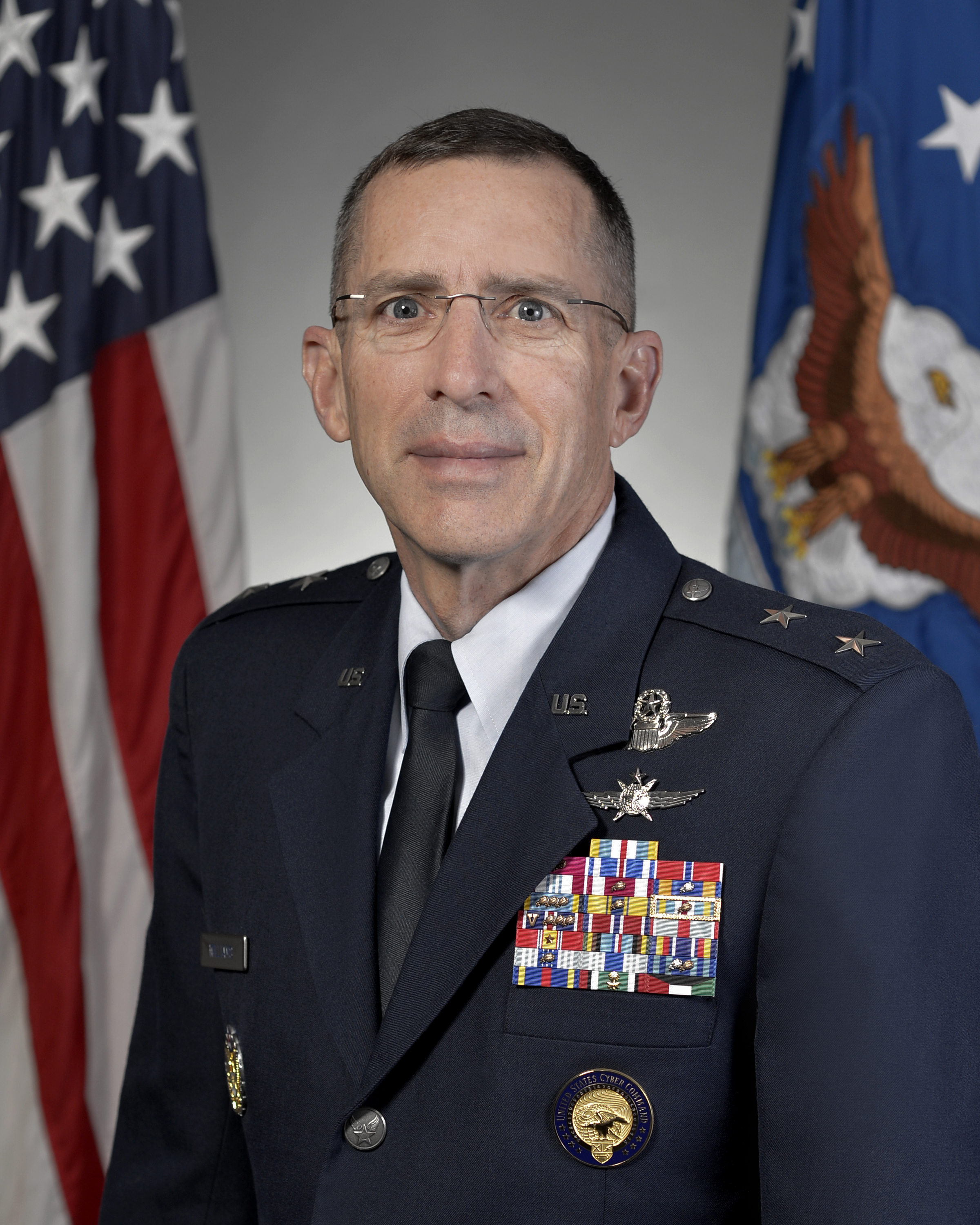
- Military career
- Allegiance: United States of America
- Branch: United States Air Force
- Service years: 1981-2014
- Rank: Major General
- Conflicts: 1. Desert Shield; 2. Desert Storm; 3. Southern Watch; 4. Northern Watch; 5. Iraqi Freedom
- Awards: 1. Distinguished Service Medal; 2. Legion of Merit; 3. Distinguished Flying Cross; 4. Bronze Star Medal; 5. Defense Meritorious Service Medal; 6. Meritorious Service Medal; 7. Air Medal; 8. Aerial Achievement Medal; 9. Air Force Commendation Medal
- Other work: Speaker, Business Executive

Brett T. Williams is a retired United States Air Force major general who served as director of operations for U.S. Cyber Command from July 2012 to June 2014. He retired from the Air Force on June 1, 2014.

== Background ==
Williams earned his commission as a distinguished graduate of the ROTC program at Duke University. He is a graduate of Euro-NATO Joint Jet Pilot training and the USAF Fighter Weapons Instructor Course.

During his Air Force career, Williams served in four senior leadership positions: As the director of operations (J3) at U.S. Cyber Command, he led a team of 400 people responsible for offensive global operations and defense of all DOD networks; as the director of operations (A3O), he led the service's largest staff directorate, comprising more than 1300 Airmen and civilians stationed worldwide; as the director of communications (J6) for U.S. Pacific Command, his 150-person directorate executed an annual budget of $57 million and was responsible for command and control networks supporting DOD's largest geographic warfighting command; and finally, as the inspector general for Air Combat Command, he was responsible for oversight of all U.S.-based combat flying organizations.

Operationally, Williams led a variety of complex entities ranging in size from 300 to more than 9000 personnel. His most significant leadership position was as commander of the 18th Wing in Okinawa, Japan, the largest combat wing in the Air Force. Williams was responsible for relationships with Japanese political and business leaders in a highly volatile community environment. He executed an annual budget in excess of $100 million in support of more than 25,000 U.S. service members, their families and Japanese employees. Williams is an F-15C fighter pilot with 28 years of flying experience, including more than 100 combat missions. In 2009, he was presented with the General and Mrs. Jerome F. O'Malley Award.

He is a command pilot with more than 3,700 hours in the F-15C and more than 100 combat missions in operations Desert Shield, Desert Storm, Southern Watch, Northern Watch, and Iraqi Freedom.

== Current activities ==
Williams is a founder of IronNet Cybersecurity, Inc., and is president of its operations, training and security division. As a leading expert on cybersecurity, Williams has appeared on NBC's Meet the Press with Chuck Todd, ABC's This Week with George Stephanopoulos and MSNBC's The Last Word with Lawrence O'Donnell.

He conducts cyber-risk training seminars as a faculty member of the National Association of Corporate Directors, and is chairman of the advisory board for the Duke University School of Nursing. He serves on a board for Ciena Government Solutions Inc., and serves on the board of advisors for TRI-COR Industries, an IT services firm.

== Education ==
1. 1981 Bachelor of Science degree in computer science, Duke University, Durham, N.C.
2. 1988 Master of Arts in business administration and management, Webster University, Mo.
3. 1989 USAF Fighter Weapons Instructor Course, Nellis AFB, Nev.
4. 1993 Air Command and Staff College, Maxwell AFB, Ala.
5. 1994 School of Advanced Airpower Studies, Maxwell AFB, Ala.
6. 2002 Advanced Strategic Arts Program, U.S. Army War College, Carlisle Barracks, Pa.
7. 2009 Joint Force Air Component Commander Course, Maxwell AFB, Ala.
8. 2011 Joint Flag Officer Warfighting Course, Maxwell AFB, Ala.

== Assignments ==
1. November 1981 - December 1982, student, Euro-NATO joint jet pilot training, Sheppard AFB, Texas
2. January 1983 - April 1983, student, fighter lead-in training, Holloman AFB, N.M.
3. May 1983 - August 1983, student, F-15 Replacement Training Unit, Luke AFB, Ariz
4. September 1983 - November 1986, instructor pilot and flight examiner, 58th Tactical Fighter Squadron, Eglin AFB, Fla.
5. November 1986 - November 1988, instructor pilot and flight examiner, 57th Fighter Interceptor Squadron, Keflavik, Iceland
6. January 1989 - April 1989, student, U.S. Air Force Fighter Weapons Instructor Course, Nellis AFB, Nev.
7. May 1989 - July 1992, weapons officer and flight commander, 27th Tactical Fighter Squadron, Langley AFB, Va.
8. August 1992 - July 1993, student, Air Command and Staff College, Maxwell AFB, Ala. Distinguished Service Medal
9. August 1993 - July 1994, student, School of Advanced Airpower Studies, Maxwell AFB, Ala.
10. August 1994 - November 1996, plans officer, Strategic Plans and Policy (J5), U.S. Central Command, MacDill AFB, Fla.
11. February 1997 - November 2000, operations officer and Commander, 94th Fighter Squadron, Langley AFB, Va.
12. December 2000 - July 2001, Deputy Commander, 1st Operations Group, Langley AFB, Va.
13. August 2001 - June 2002, student, Advanced Strategic Arts Program, U.S. Army War College, Carlisle Barracks, Pa.
14. August 2002 - June 2003, Commander, 363rd Expeditionary Operations Group, Prince Sultan Air Base, Saudi Arabia
15. August 2003 - July 2004, Chief, Checkmate Division, Deputy Chief of Staff for Air and Space Operations, Headquarters U.S. Air Force, Washington, D.C.
16. July 2004 - June 2006, Commander, 33rd Fighter Wing, Eglin AFB, Fla.
17. June 2006 - May 2007, Inspector General, Headquarters Air Combat Command, Langley AFB, Va.
18. May 2007 - July 2009, Commander, 18th Wing, Kadena AB, Japan
19. July 2009 - January 2011, Director, Command, Control, Communications and Computer Systems (J6), U.S. Pacific Command, Camp H.M. Smith, Hawaii 20. January 2011 – July 2012, Director, Operations, Deputy Chief of Staff for Operations, Plans and Requirements, Headquarters U.S. Air Force, Washington, D.C.
20. July 2011 - June 2014, Director of Operations (J3), United States Cyber Command, Ft. Meade, Md.

== Flight information ==
- Rating: Command pilot
- Flight hours: More than 3,700
- Aircraft flown: F-15C

== Publications ==
- "Effects-Based Operations: Theory, Application and the Role of Airpower," published as Chapter 5, Transformation Concepts for National Security in the 21st Century, Williamson Murray, Editor, September 2002
- "10 Propositions Regarding Cyberspace Operations," Joint Force Quarterly, Issue 61, 2d October 2011
- "Cyberspace: What is it, where is it and who cares?" Armed Forces Journal, March 13, 2014
- "The Joint Force Commander’s Guide to Cyberspace Operations," Joint Force Quarterly, Issue 73, 2d Quarter 2014

== Effective dates of promotion ==
Promotions
Insignia	Rank	Date
	Major General	November 11, 2010
	Brigadier General	October 2, 2007
	Colonel	July 1, 2002
	Lieutenant Colonel	January 1, 1998
	Major	June 1, 1993
	Captain	April 15, 1985
	First Lieutenant	April 15, 1983
	Second Lieutenant	May 9, 1981

Military offices
Preceded by Harold W. Moulton II	Commander of the 18th Wing; 2007–2009	Succeeded by Kenneth S. Wilsbach
Preceded by ???	Director of Operations of the United States Cyber Command; 2012–2014	Succeeded by Michael M. Gilday
