= Michael M. Gilday =

U.S. Navy admiral, 32nd chief of naval operations

Mike Gilday
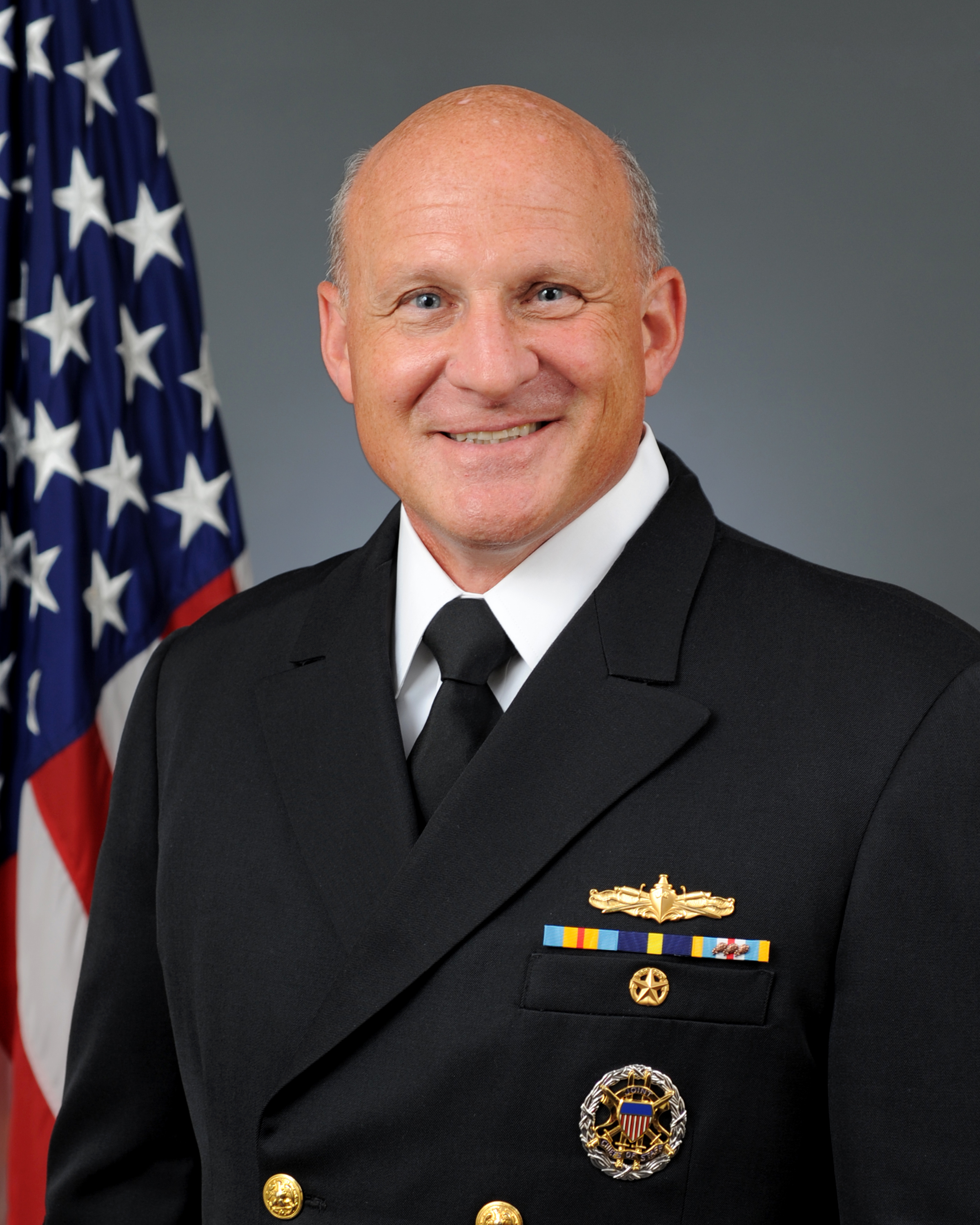
- Born: Michael Martin Gilday; October 10, 1962 (age 64); Lowell, Massachusetts, U.S.
- Education: United States Naval Academy (BS); Harvard University (MPA); National Defense University (MS)
- Spouse: Linda Gilday
- Military career
- Allegiance: United States
- Branch: United States Navy
- Service years: 1985–2023
- Rank: Admiral
- Commands: Chief of Naval Operations; United States Tenth Fleet; Fleet Cyber Command; Carrier Strike Group 8; Destroyer Squadron 7; USS Benfold; USS Higgins; USS Gettysburg
- Conflicts: Gulf War
- Awards: Defense Distinguished Service Medal; Navy Distinguished Service Medal; Defense Superior Service Medal (4); Legion of Merit (3); Bronze Star
- Michael M. Gilday's voice Gilday's opening statement at a Senate Appropriations subcommittee hearing on the FY2024 Navy and Marine Corps budget request Recorded March 28, 2023

Michael Martin Gilday (born October 10, 1962) is a retired United States Navy officer who last served as the 32nd chief of naval operations from August 22, 2019 to August 14, 2023. Gilday commanded two destroyers, served as Director of the Joint Staff, commanded the Tenth Fleet/Fleet Cyber Command, and led Carrier Strike Group 8.

== Early life and education ==
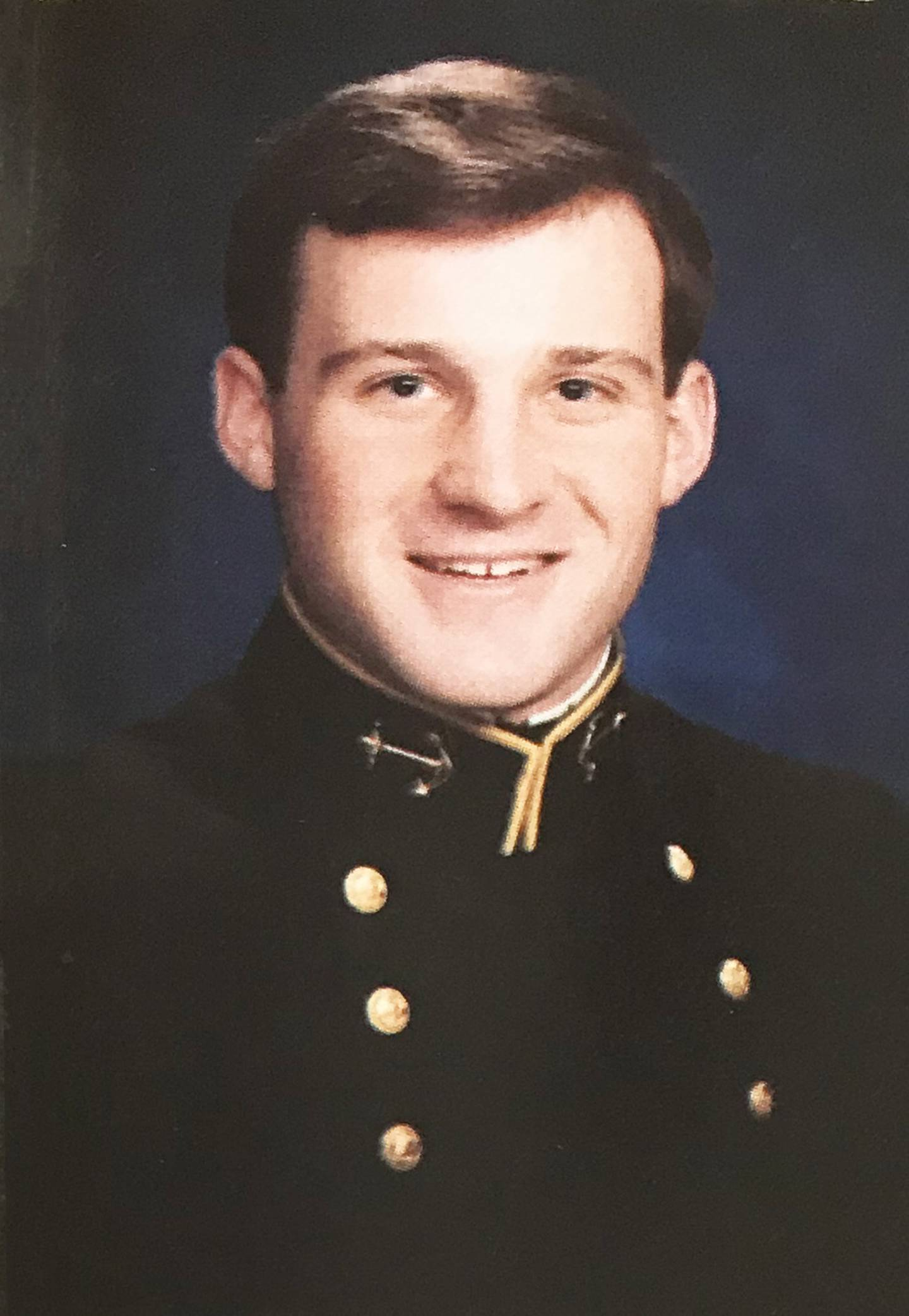
Official midshipman portrait, 1985

Gilday was born in Lowell, Massachusetts, and is a 1985 graduate of the United States Naval Academy as a surface warfare officer. He has also graduated with master's degrees from the Harvard Kennedy School and the National War College of National Defense University. His wife's name is Linda and she is an engineer and program manager.

== Career ==
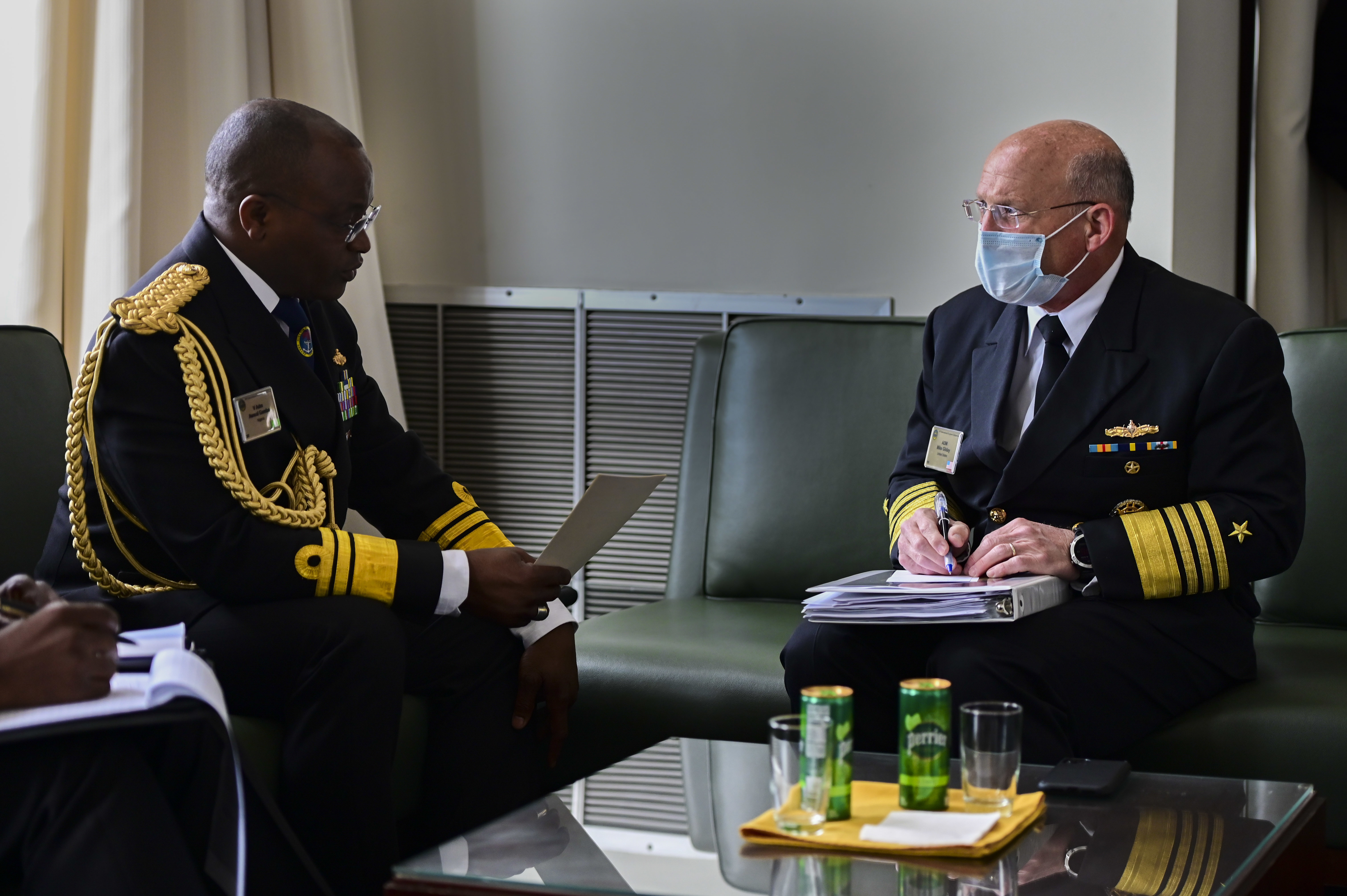
Gilday, right, speaks with the Nigerian Chief of Naval Staff, Vice Adm. Awwal Gambo, at the 24th International Seapower Symposium, September 16, 2021.

Gilday's previous tours include duty with USS Chandler, USS Princeton, executive officer of USS Gettysburg as well as commanding the USS Higgins and USS Benfold and Destroyer Squadron 7. He also had staff assignments on the Bureau of Naval Personnel, Chief of Naval Operation (Strategic Plans and Policy Directorate) and staff to the vice chief of naval operations. His joint assignments include Naval Aide to the President and executive assistant to the chairman of the Joint Chiefs of Staff. Gilday was awarded the Navy Commendation Medal with Valor for his actions aboard Princeton when the ship was damaged by an Iraqi mine during the Persian Gulf War.

As a flag officer, Gilday served as Director of Operations for NATO's Joint Force Command in Lisbon and Director of Operations for United States Cyber Command. He assumed the duties of Commander, Fleet Cyber Command and United States Tenth Fleet on July 14, 2016, was appointed Director of Operations for the Joint Chiefs of Staff in May 2018, and became Director of the Joint Staff from March 1, 2019.

On July 11, 2019, Gilday was nominated for appointment as the next chief of naval operations (CNO). On August 1, the United States Senate voted unanimously to award Gilday a fourth star following the Senate Armed Services Committee's recommendation that he succeed Admiral John M. Richardson as CNO in September 2019.

On April 15, 2020, Gilday announced the Navy was considering reinstating Brett Crozier, earlier fired in relation to his controversial response to coronavirus disease on the aircraft carrier USS Theodore Roosevelt. Gilday and the acting United States Secretary of the Navy, James E. McPherson, recommended that Crozier be reinstated as captain of the Roosevelt on April 25, 2020.

On August 10, 2020, Gilday was running on the Washington Navy Yard base, where he lives, when he "fell ill". Gilday was assisted by a passing Marine, and was taken to his physician. He underwent heart surgery for a pre-existing condition about two weeks later. He returned to work full-time on September 28.

His term as chief of naval operations ended on August 14, 2023.

== Fat Leonard involvement ==
On March 10, 2007, Captain Gilday attended a banquet with 17 other naval officers hosted by Malaysian husbanding contractor Leonard Francis. Gilday and the other officers paid $50 for the dinner. A subsequent investigation determined that Francis had spent $20,962 on the dinner, and that the officers had therefore violated ethics rules barring them from receiving gifts of more than $20.Investigators from NCIS and DCIS questioned Gilday on June 1, 2015. Gilday said he had felt uncomfortable at the dinner, which had cost far more than $50 apiece, but said he had assumed the event was "cleared through legal channels." The Navy investigation found that Gilday "honestly and reasonably believed [his] attendance was ethically permissible." Gilday's attendance at the dinner was not known during his Naval career.

== Awards and decorations ==

Surface Warfare Officer Pin
Defense Distinguished Service Medal		Navy Distinguished Service Medal
Defense Superior Service Medal w/ 3 bronze oak leaf clusters	Legion of Merit w/ 2 gold award stars	Bronze Star Medal
Defense Meritorious Service Medal	Meritorious Service Medal w/ 2 award stars	Joint Service Commendation Medal
Navy and Marine Corps Commendation Medal w/ "V" device and 2 award stars	Joint Service Achievement Medal	Navy and Marine Corps Achievement Medal w/ 1 award star
Combat Action Ribbon	Joint Meritorious Unit Award w/ 3 oak leaf clusters	Navy Unit Commendation w/ 1 bronze service star
Navy Meritorious Unit Commendation w/ 1 silver service star	Navy "E" Ribbon with wreathed Battle E device	National Defense Service Medal with service star
Armed Forces Expeditionary Medal with 4 service stars	Southwest Asia Service Medal with 2 service stars	Global War on Terrorism Expeditionary Medal
Global War on Terrorism Service Medal	Humanitarian Service Medal	Navy Sea Service Deployment Ribbon w/ 1 silver service star
Navy and Marine Corps Overseas Service Ribbon	Grand Cordon of the Order of the Rising Sun	Kuwait Liberation Medal (Saudi Arabia)
Kuwait Liberation Medal (Kuwait)	Navy Rifle Marksmanship Ribbon with Sharpshooter Device	Navy Expert Pistol Shot Medal
Command at Sea insignia
Joint Chiefs of Staff Badge
Presidential Service Badge

Military offices
Preceded by Brett T. Williams	Director of Operations of the United States Cyber Command; 2014–2016	Succeeded by George Franz
Preceded by Jan E. Tighe	Commander of United States Tenth Fleet and Fleet Cyber Command; 2016–2018	Succeeded by Timothy J. White
Preceded by John L. Dolan	Director for Operations of the Joint Staff; 2018–2019	Succeeded by Andrew P. Poppas
Preceded by Kenneth F. McKenzie Jr.	Director of the Joint Staff; 2019	Succeeded by Glen D. VanHerck
Preceded by John Richardson	Chief of Naval Operations; 2019–2023	Succeeded by Lisa Franchetti
