= International Seapower Symposium =

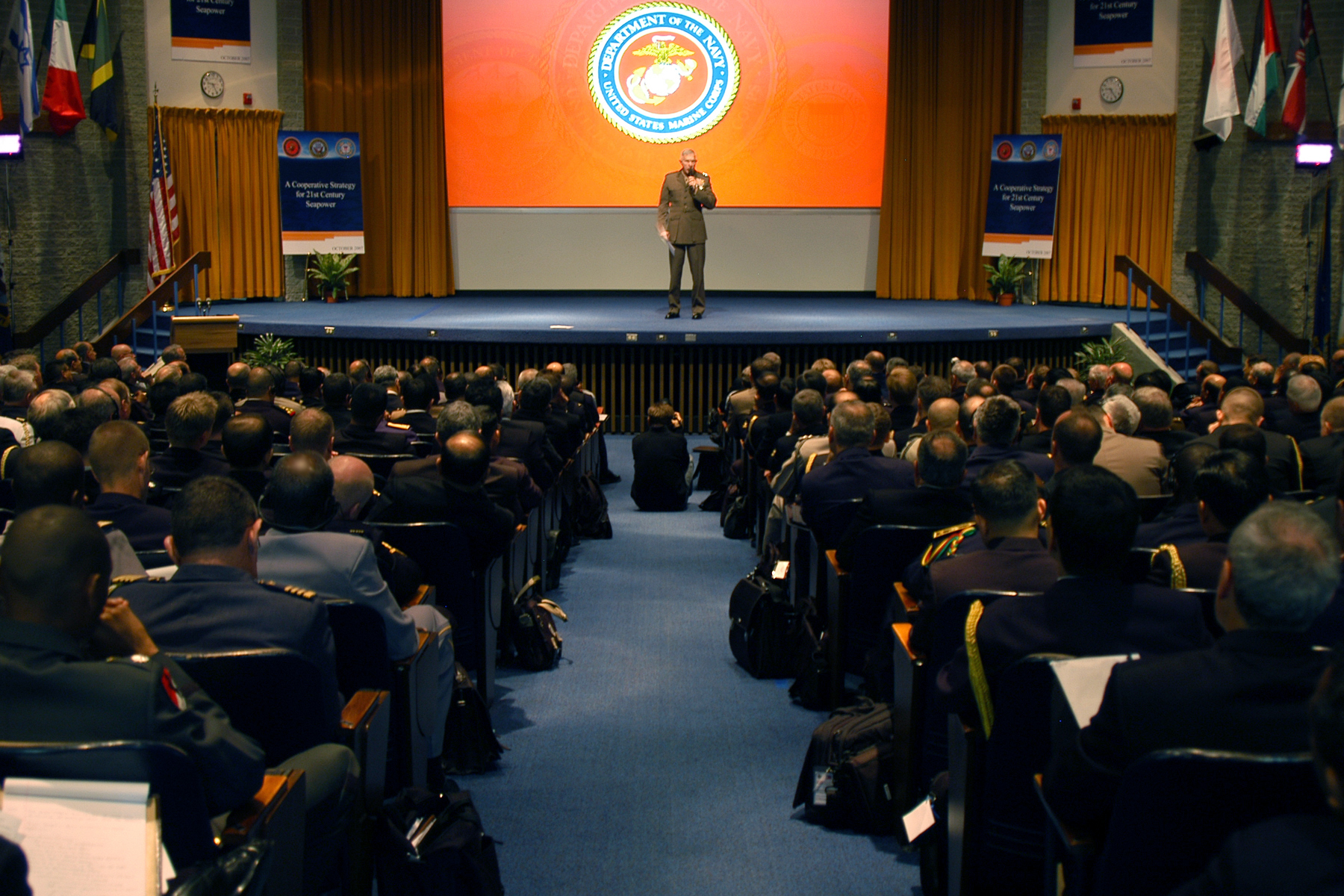
Commandant of the United States Marine Corps James T. Conway speaking during the 18th International Seapower Symposium in 2007

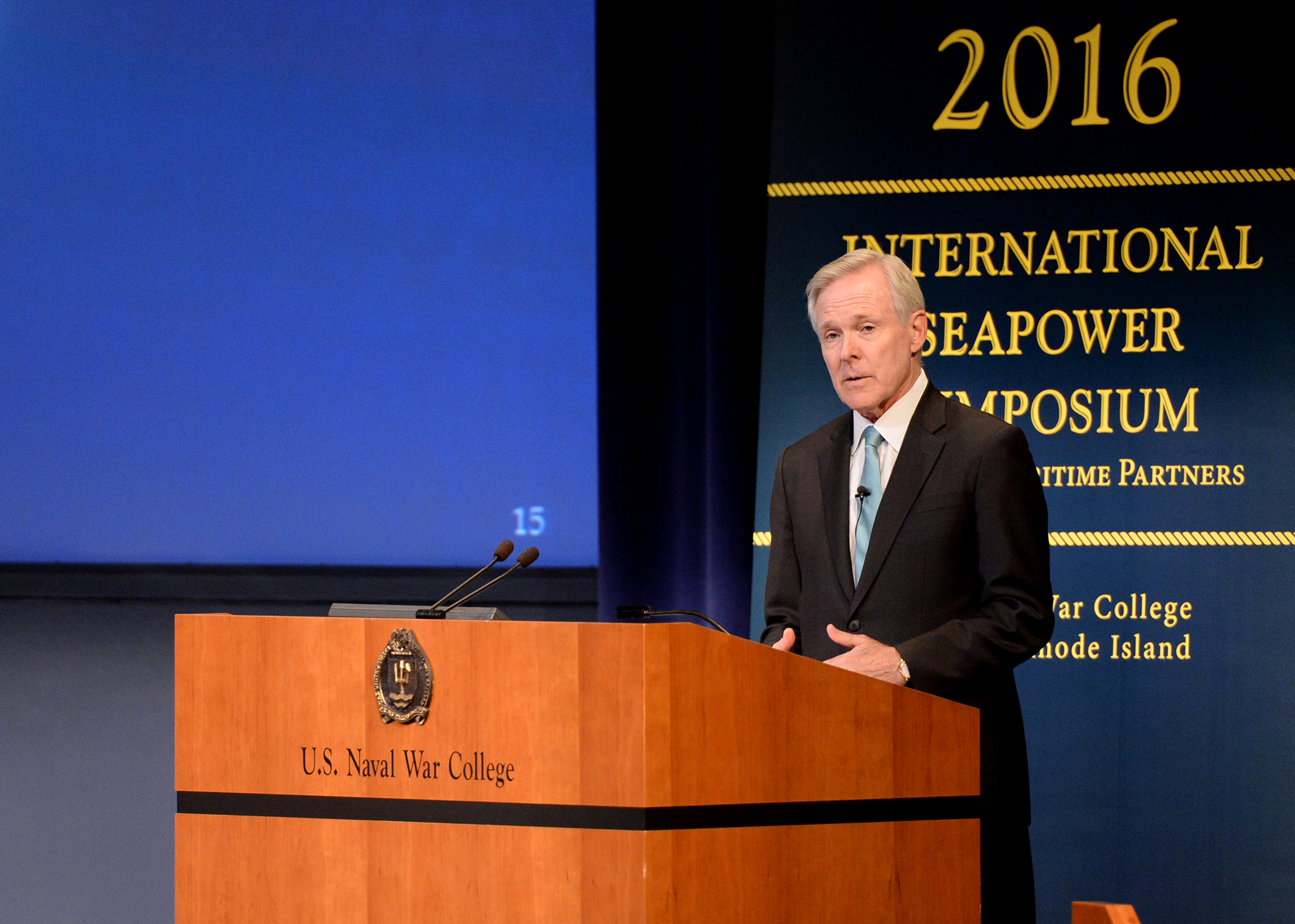
Secretary of the Navy Ray Mabus speaking at the 22nd International Seapower Symposium in 2016

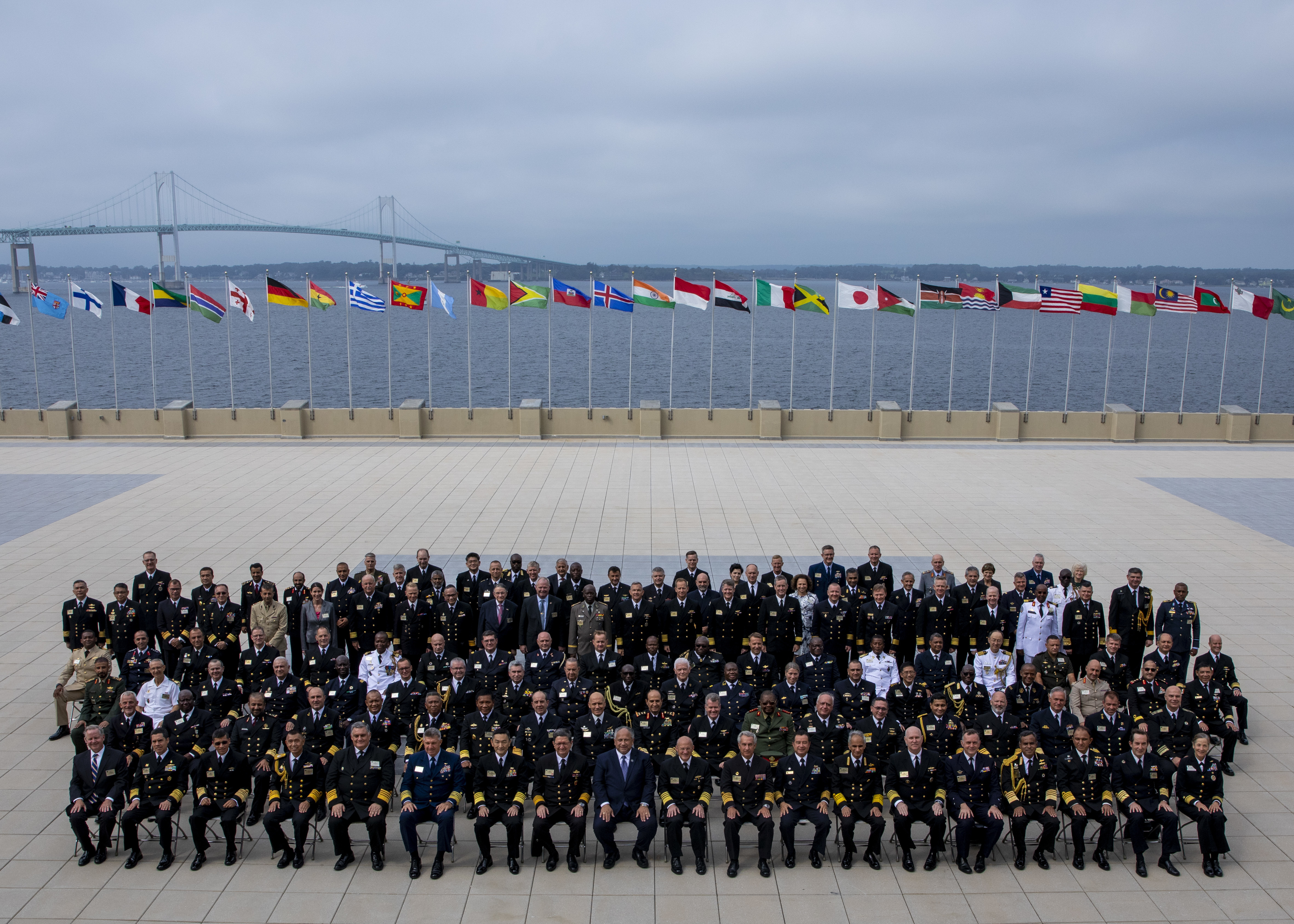
International delegates, including the U.S Secretary of the Navy and heads of navies and coast guards pose for a photo during the 24th International Seapower Symposium in 2021.

The International Seapower Symposium (ISS) is a biennial meeting of the world's chiefs of navy that has met at the United States Naval War College since 1969. The proceedings of these symposia have been published on the Internet since ISS XVI in 2003.

== History ==
With the objective of promoting mutual understanding among the several leaders of the world's maritime nations, the First International Seapower Symposium (ISS I) was convened at the Naval War College in Newport, Rhode Island on 17–20 November 1969. This four-day symposium was conceived by the President of the Naval War College, Vice Admiral Richard G. Colbert, U.S. Navy, who served as host for the ISS I. The Chief of Naval Operations, Admiral Thomas H. Moorer addressed the meeting. As a result of the success of this symposium, plans were made to continue these discussions as a biennial event. All International Seapower Symposia, since, have been conducted at the Naval War College, and hosted by the incumbent Chief of Naval Operations with only two exceptions. Early fall dates have been selected to take advantage of both the normally good weather and also the relaxed atmosphere in Newport.

No.	Abbreviation	Date	Title	Host	Topics	Attendance	References
1	ISS I	17–20 November 1969	First Seapower Symposium	Vice Admiral Richard G. Colbert			
2	ISS II	1–5 November 1971		Admiral Elmo R. Zumwalt Jr.	To further "... a sense of unity through the sharing of common problems."	67 delegates representing 41 nations	
3	ISS III	15–19 October 1973		Admiral Elmo R. Zumwalt Jr.	In a departure from the traditional discussion of strategy and military force, the Symposium examined, in some depth, the non-military uses of naval forces in the maritime world.	Fifty-four delegates represented thirty-eight nations	
4	ISS IV	6–9 July 1976	The role of Navies in the 1980s	Admiral James L. Holloway, III		Delegations represented Forty-eight nations	
5	ISS V	2–5 October 1979	The Role of Navies in a World of Peace	Admiral Thomas B. Hayward		Delegations representing Forty-nine nations attended	
6	ISS VI	28 June through 1 July 1981	World Navies in the 1980s			Forty-eight nations took part	
7	ISS VII	7–10 November 1983	Emerging Naval Roles to the Year 2000	Admiral James D. Watkins			
8	ISS VIII	20–23 October 1985	Maritime Security Planning – Traditional vs. Non-Traditional Views	Admiral James D. Watkins		Forty-six nations attended.	
9	ISS IX	25–28 October 1987	Maritime Power in an Era of Low Intensity Conflict	Admiral Carlisle A.H. Trost	Agreement was reached to establish the Western Pacific Naval Symposium.	Fifty-four nations attended	
10	ISS X	22–25 October 1989	Meeting Commitments in an Era of Fiscal Constraint	Admiral Carlisle A.H. Trost		forty-one nations in attendance	
11	ISS XI	6–9 October 1991	Emerging Cooperative Maritime Roles in a Changing World Environment	Admiral Frank B. Kelso II		Fifty-seven nations were represented.	
12	ISS XII	7–10 November 1993	Maritime Coalitions and International Security	Admiral Frank B. Kelso II		One hundred-thirty delegates representing seventy-one nations were in attendance.	
13	ISS XIII	5–8 November 1995	Partnership ... From the Sea	Admiral Jeremy Boorda		There were one hundred thirty-two delegates from sixty-seven nations taking part in this 4-day event.	
14	ISS XIV	2–5 November 1997	Seapower and Common security in the 21st Century	Admiral Jay L. Johnson		Seventy-three nations were in attendance	
15	ISS XV	7–10 November 1999	Maritime Strategies for a Naval Century	Admiral Jay L. Johnson		One hundred fifty-two delegates representing seventy nations were in attendance.	
16	ISS XVI	26–29 October 2003	Seapower for Peace, Prosperity and Security			56 CNO counterparts attended the Symposium with an overall number of 203 delegates representing 69 nations in attendance.	
17	ISS XVII	20–23 September 2005	A Global Network of Nations for a Free and Secure Maritime Commons	Admiral Michael Mullen		Attendees included 55 CNO counterparts, with the overall number of 137 delegates from 70 nations, and 43 Naval Attachés.	
18	ISS XVIII	16–19 October 2007	Forging Cooperative Solutions for International Maritime Security	Admiral Gary Roughead	It was here that the US Navy announced their new maritime strategy, moving the focus from sea combat to a broader base that incorporated the prevention of combat.	Attendees included 69 CNO counterparts, 21 Commandants of Coast Guards and 16 War College Presidents. Over 100 nations were represented.	
19	ISS XIX	7–9 October 2009	Connecting Navies, Building Partnership	Admiral Gary Roughead	Secretary of the Navy Ray Mabus opened the symposium		
20	ISS XX	18–21 October 2011	Security and Prosperity through Maritime Partnerships	Admiral Jonathan Greenert			
21	ISS XXI	16–19 September 2014	Global Solutions to Common Maritime Challenges	Admiral Jonathan Greenert	Opened by the Secretary of the Navy, Ray Mabus		
22	ISS XXII	20–23 September 2016	Stronger Maritime Partners	Admiral John M. Richardson			
23	ISS XXIII	18–21 September 2018	Security, Order, Prosperity	Admiral John M. Richardson			
24	ISS XXIV	14–17 September 2021	Strength in Unity	Admiral Michael M. Gilday			
25	ISS XXV	19-22 September 2023	Security Through Partnership	Admiral Lisa Franchetti			
