= Khairil Anwar =

Indonesian footballer (born 1997)

Personal information
- Full name: Khairil Anwar
- Date of birth: 21 August 1997 (age 29)
- Place of birth: Banda Aceh, Indonesia
- Height: 1.72 m (5 ft 8 in)
- Position: Defensive midfielder

Youth career
- 2017: Pra Pora Aceh
- 2018: Pemko FC
- 2018: Kuala Nanggroe
- 2019: PSAB Aceh Besar
- 2020–2021: PON Aceh

Senior career*
Years	Team	Apps	(Gls)
2021–2022	Persiraja Banda Aceh	12	(0)
2022	Deltras	4	(0)
2023–2024	Persiraja Banda Aceh	6	(0)
- * Club domestic league appearances and goals as of 6 January 2024

Khairil Anwar (born 21 August 1997) is an Indonesian professional footballer who plays as a defensive midfielder.

== Club career ==
=== Persiraja Banda Aceh ===
He was signed for Persiraja Banda Aceh to play in the Liga 1 in the 2021 season. Anwar made his league debut on 16 January 2022 in a match against Persipura Jayapura at the Kompyang Sujana Stadium, Denpasar.

== Career statistics ==
=== Club ===
As of 6 January 2024.

Club	Season	League		Cup		Continental		Other		Total	
Club	Season	Apps	Goals	Apps	Goals	Apps	Goals	Apps	Goals	Apps	Goals
Persiraja Banda Aceh	2021	12	0	0	0	–		0	0	12	0
Deltras	2022–23	4	0	0	0	–		0	0	4	0
Persiraja Banda Aceh	2023–24	6	0	0	0	–		0	0	6	0
Career total		22	0	0	0	0	0	0	0	22	0
