= Means Johnston Jr. =

United States Navy admiral (1916–1989)

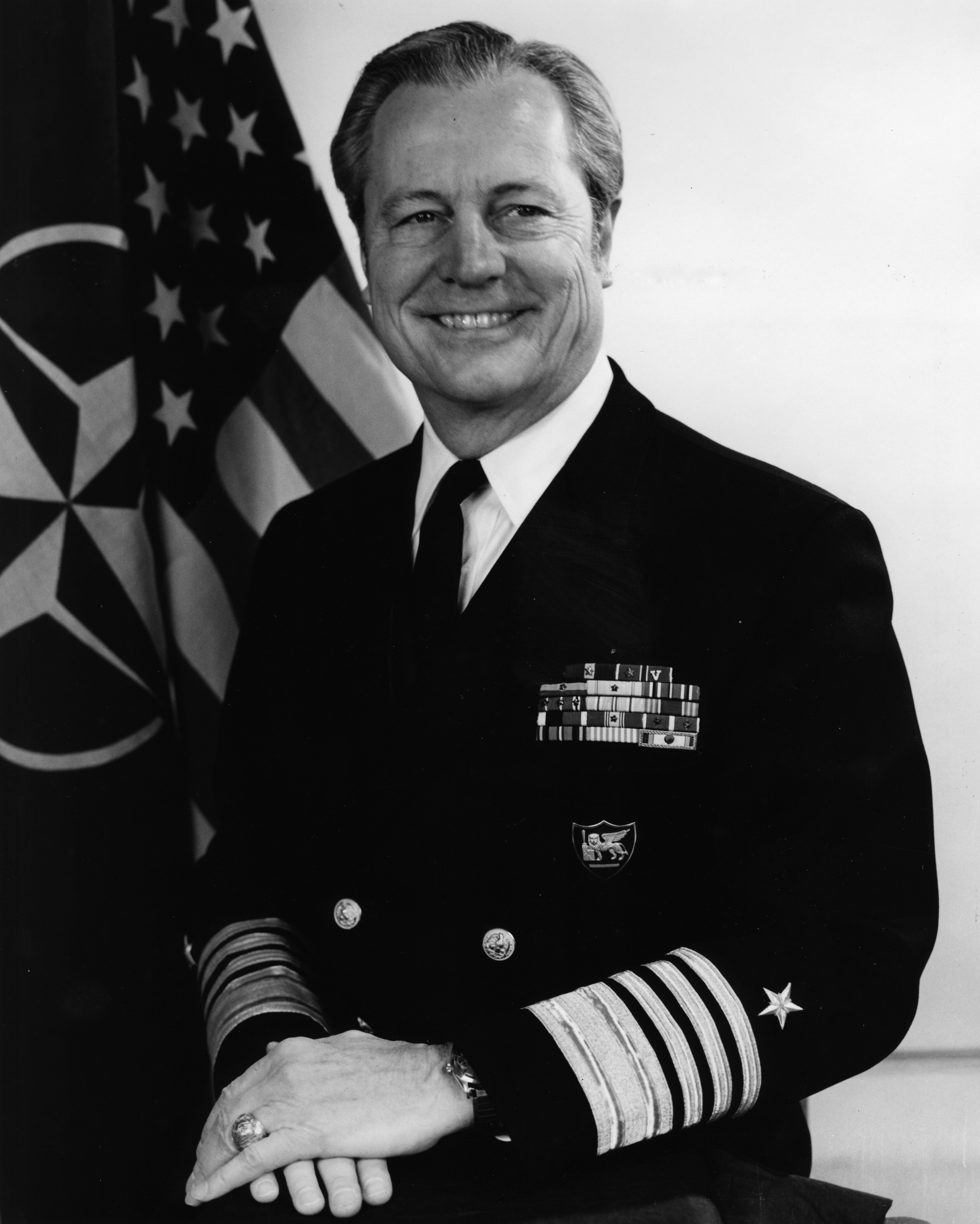
- Born: December 5, 1916; Schlater, Mississippi, U.S.
- Died: July 14, 1989 (aged 72); Washington D.C., U.S.
- Burial place: Arlington National Cemetery
- Military career
- Allegiance: United States
- Branch: United States Navy
- Rank: Admiral
- Commands: Allied Forces Southern Europe
- Conflicts: World War II

Means Johnston Jr. (December 5, 1916 – July 14, 1989) was an admiral in the United States Navy.

== Biography ==
A native of Mississippi, Johnston graduated from the United States Naval Academy in 1939. During World War II, Johnston commanded a naval base at Rhode Island and a destroyer. After the war, Johnston served as the Navy's Chief of Legislative Affairs and Inspector General during the late 1960s and early 1970s. He later would be promoted at admiral and serve as Commander in Chief, Allied Forces Southern Europe from 1973 to 1975.

He was married to Hope Manning Larkin. He died of prostate cancer in 1989 and was buried at Arlington National Cemetery.
