= Western Pacific Naval Symposium =

The Western Pacific Naval Symposium is a series of biennial meetings of the Pacific nations to discuss naval matters held on even numbered years. A WPNS workshop is held on odd numbered years in between the symposiums.

== History ==
At the International Seapower Symposium in 1987 agreement was reached "to establish a forum where leaders of regional navies could meet to discuss cooperative initiatives". The first meeting was held in 1988.

Member countries as of 2010: Australia, Brunei, Cambodia, Canada, Chile, France, Indonesia, Japan, Malaysia, New Zealand, Papua New Guinea, People's Republic of China, Philippines, Republic of Korea, Russia, Singapore, Thailand, Tonga, United States of America, Vietnam. Observers: Bangladesh, India, Mexico, Peru, The United Kingdom.

At the 2014 WPNS, agreement was reached on the Code for Unplanned Encounters at Sea.
