= RSS Panglima =

Former training ship of the Republic of Singapore Navy

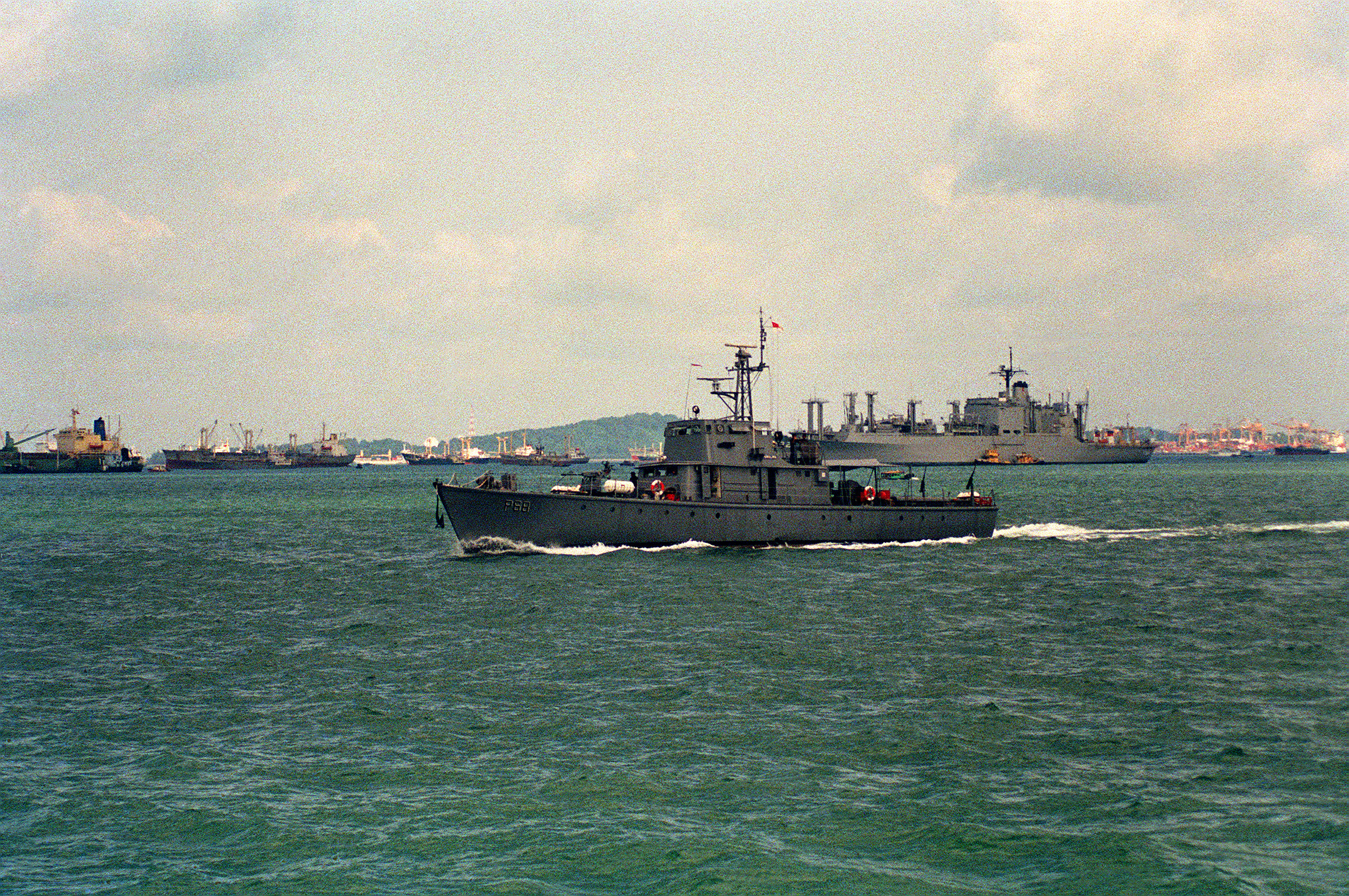
- RSS Panglima underway in the Singapore Strait

History

Malayan RNVR
- Name: HMS Panglima
- Builder: United Engineers Ltd
- Laid down: 1954
- Launched: 14 January 1956
- Commissioned: See note (Note: The date of Panglima’s commissioning into MRNVR service differs between sources: A 1955 The Straits Times article dated 28 December states she would be commissioned in March 1956.; During her launch event in January 1956, it was stated that she would be commissioned in April 1956.; The former website of the Retired Malaysian Naval Officers Association claims she was commissioned in May 1956.)
- Fate: Transferred to Malaysia

Malaysia
- Name: KD Panglima
- Commissioned: 22 September 1963
- Fate: Transferred to Singapore

Singapore
- Name: RSS Panglima
- Commissioned: See note (Note: The date of Panglima’s commissioning into Singapore service differs between sources: The commissioning order, dated 24 October 1966, states that she was due to be commissioned on 31 October 1966.; A 1966 The Straits Times article dated 2 November states she was commissioned "yesterday", which would be 1 November 1966.; A 1992 The New Paper article states she was commissioned on 1 January 1966.)
- Decommissioned: 9 July 1991
- Identification: Pennant number: P68
- Fate: Sold to New West Coast Pte Ltd

General characteristics
- Class & type: Ford-class boat
- Length: 35.7 m (117 ft)
- Beam: 6.1 m (20 ft)
- Propulsion: 820 kW
- Speed: 15 knots (17 mph; 28 km/h)
- Range: 3,000 miles (4,800 km)
- Complement: 49 officers and enlisted
- Armament: 1 × anti-aircraft gun; Anti-submarine depth-chargers

RSS Panglima (P68) was the first ship of the Republic of Singapore Navy. The ship was commissioned in 1956 as HMS Panglima and was the third ship to be given the name. She was regarded as a milestone for the Malayan shipbuilding industry. During her service in the Malayan Royal Navy Volunteer Reserve, the ship hosted distinguished guests such as South Vietnamese vice president Nguyễn Ngọc Thơ and Singapore's first native head of state the Yang di-Pertuan Negara Yusof bin Ishak. She also embarked on numerous goodwill visits to nearby ports and conducted naval training for new sailors.

Upon Singapore's merger to form Malaysia, the ship was recommissioned as KD Panglima in September 1962. She engaged in several minor skirmishes with Indonesia during the Indonesia–Malaysia confrontation. Singapore's secession on 9 August 1965 led to the ship's recommissioning as RSS Panglima in 1966.

The ship underwent a major refit prior to being transferred to Midshipman School in 1983 to serve exclusively as a training ship. In 1991, she was decommissioned and sold at auction, after having served in three navies across 35 years of active service. The Naval Military Experts Institute still bears her name today.

== Name and predecessors ==
The word Panglima is derived from a Malay language title commonly translated as warrior or commander. The name Panglima was assigned to three ships which operated between 1937 and 1991.

Her first predecessor Panglima was a motor launch built by Messrs Thornycroft (Singapore) built at a cost of $100,000. Panglima and her sister ship Pahlawan was handed over to the Straits Settlements government on 26 January 1937 and incorporated into the Straits Settlements Royal Naval Volunteer Reserve (SSRNVR). Panglima could accommodate 7 officers and 12 ratings and had an armament of a 3-pounder gun, one Lewis anti-aircraft gun, minesweeping equipment and four depth charges. As of February 1938, she served alongside Pahlawan, Plover, Peningat, King Fisher, Curlew and Lady Clifford in the SSRNVR. Panglima participated in the opening ceremony of King George VI Dock in Singapore on 14 February 1938. She was bombed and sunk by the Japanese during the Fall of Singapore in February 1942.

After the war, a second 92 foot (28 m) Panglima was handed over by the Royal Navy to the Malayan Royal Naval Volunteer Reserve (MRNVR). She underwent a two-month refit to equip her with radars and radio equipment and was capable of accommodating 8 officers and 24 ratings, undergoing sea trials on 7 September 1948. Panglima was part of nightly anti-smuggling and security operations in the Strait of Johor together with Simbang. On 28 December 1955, it was announced that Panglima was "not suitable for sea training" and would be replaced by a third ship.

== Construction ==
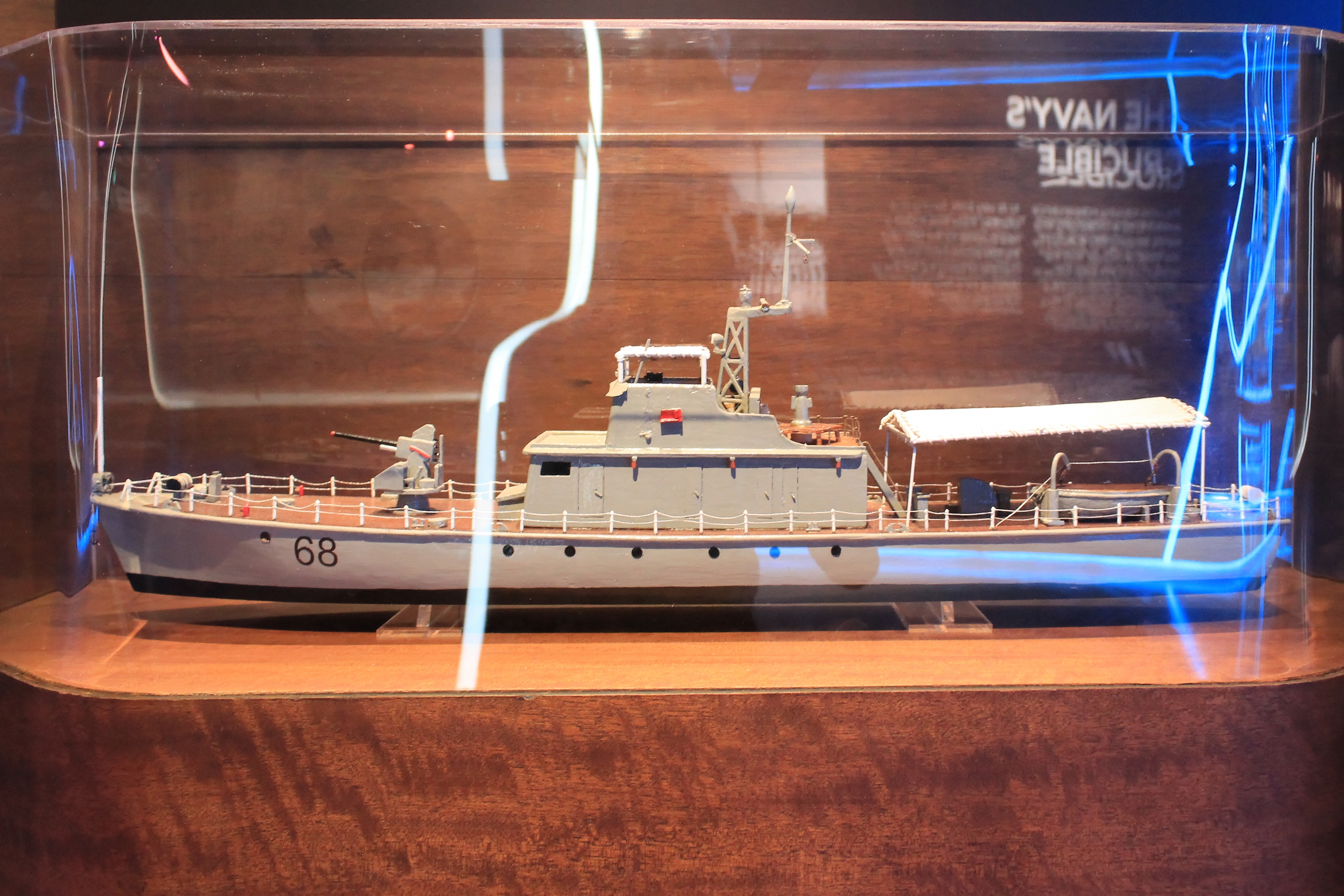
RSS Panglima model showing her original bridge prior to refit in 1981

The keel laying for a new ship took place in 1954 at a United Engineers Ltd shipyard. On 14 October 1955, it was announced that the new ship would be launched in December of that year. It was reported that the ship cost $1 million.

The ship launching ceremony for HMS Panglima was planned for 11 am, 14 January 1956, at Tanjong Rhu Dockyard. Royal Malayan Navy sailors formed a guard of honour welcoming Governor of Singapore Sir Robert Black and his wife Lady Anne Black. Religious leaders of Islam, Buddhism, Hinduism, Zoroastrianism and Christianity blessed the ship. Shortly afterward, Lady Black launched the ship in accordance with naval tradition by shattering a champagne bottle upon the bow, and Panglima slid into the waters to the fanfare of music. During the entire event, about 350 United Engineers workers who had built the ship protested outside the gates demanding for higher wages, though the ceremony was not disrupted. Sea trials were planned to commence in March and Panglima was to be commissioned in April 1956.

Panglima's hull consisted of teak and hardwood from the Malayan and Thai rainforests, coupled with a steel and light alloy. The light alloy superstructure enabled greater ship stability and reduced the overall displacement of the vessel. As aluminum surfaces required less repainting than steel, the cost of maintenance was also reduced. Such innovations were already widely practiced in other countries but Panglima was nevertheless regarded as a milestone of the Malayan shipbuilding industry. Lieutenant Commander Fleming called the ship "comparable to the most modern craft of her type in the Royal Navy".

Panglima was described as a "sub-chaser" and was equipped with anti-submarine equipment, a 40mm Bofors main gun, radar and new navigational aids.

== Operational career ==
=== MRNVR service ===
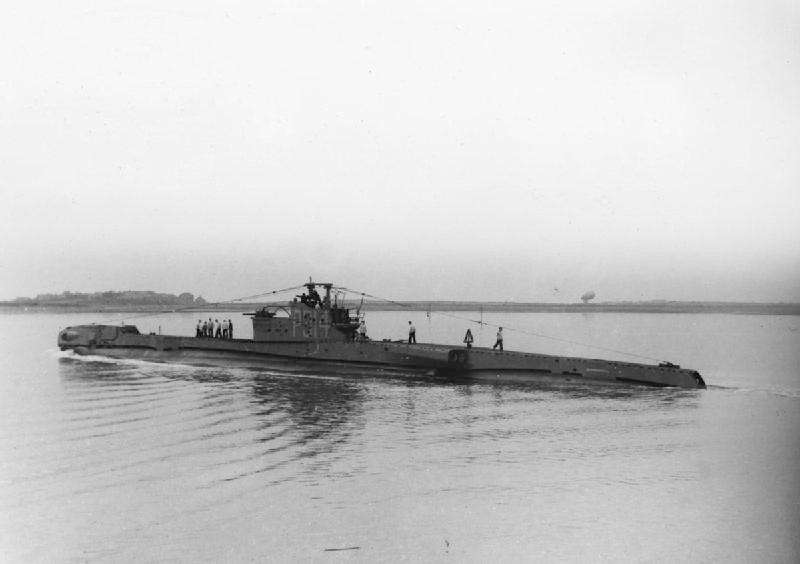
HMS Tactician conducted an exercise with HMS Panglima in September 1960

In November 1956, Panglima escorted the Royal Yacht Britannia as the latter proceeded to Langkawi and Port Swettenham (today Port Klang). As Panglima had departed Singapore hastily to rendezvous the yacht, the crew had forgotten to restock supplies. The Duke of Edinburgh gifted the ships' company six cartons of matchsticks after an officer declined a cigarette during a cocktail party onboard Britannia.

Under the command of Lieutenant Commander J.S. Macintye, Panglima sailed to Penang on 12 January 1957 as part of a routine cruise. In April 1957, Panglima visited Saigon, the capital of South Vietnam as part of a goodwill visit. The visit coincided with Queen Elizabeth II's birthday; Panglima and other Republic of Vietnam Navy ships fired a 21-gun salute at noon in her honour on 23 April. The ship also hosted the South Vietnamese vice president Nguyễn Ngọc Thơ and Navy chief Lê Quang Mỹ. She returned to Singapore on 29 April.

As a training ship, Panglima embarked three recruits from the Women's Auxiliary Naval Service (SWANS) and 14 other ratings from the Malayan and Fijian royal naval reserves in April 1958.

On 22 February 1959, the Duke of Edinburgh Prince Philip, who was also Admiral of the Fleet, visited Singapore on an official royal tour. Panglima escorted his barge from the Royal Yacht Britannia as it made its way to Clifford Pier, with her crew lining the deck. The prince departed Singapore on 25 February and Panglima accompanied astern of Britannia back out to sea.

Panglima participated in a mock battle with the Royal Navy submarine HMS Tactician in September 1960, with the former asserting a sea denial stance against its adversary seeking to enter Singapore waters. Tactician repeatedly evaded detection until sunset, when Panglima established contact and fired "depth charges" and "won" the battle. It was the first exercise the ship had conducted with a submarine, lasting three hours.

On 22 July 1961, Panglima hosted the Yang di-Pertuan Negara Yusof bin Ishak as he reviewed a naval parade put on by the Harbour Division of Singapore Customs. As Panglima sailed past the Customs fleet of speedboats and launches, they saluted the island's first native head of state by sounding their air horns.

=== Malaysian service ===
The State of Singapore merged with Malaya, North Borneo and Sarawak on 16 September 1963 to form Malaysia. On 22 September 1963, the Royal Navy officially handed over the Singapore division of the MRNVR to the Royal Malaysian Navy. HMS Panglima was recommissioned as KD Panglima (KD standing for Kapal Di-Raja, or "His Majesty's Ship"), and assigned to the Singapore Volunteer Force of the Royal Malaysian Navy.

With the ongoing Indonesia–Malaysia confrontation, Panglima was involved in patrolling the Singapore Strait against intrusions. On 1 April 1964, Panglima was on patrol duty off Pedra Branca when the survey ship HMS Dampier operating nearby rescued three Indonesian Chinese sailors from their sinking sampan during a storm. Dampier's crew pumped the water out of the sampan to make it seaworthy again, and Panglima subsequently towed it back to Singapore. Under Lieutenant Andy Miller in 1965, she was involved with a minor skirmish with Indonesian custom boats and torpedo boats. Radioing the naval headquarters for assistance, the standoff lasted seven minutes until British and Australian aircraft arrived overhead with a British frigate, resulting in the Indonesians retreating.

=== Singapore service ===
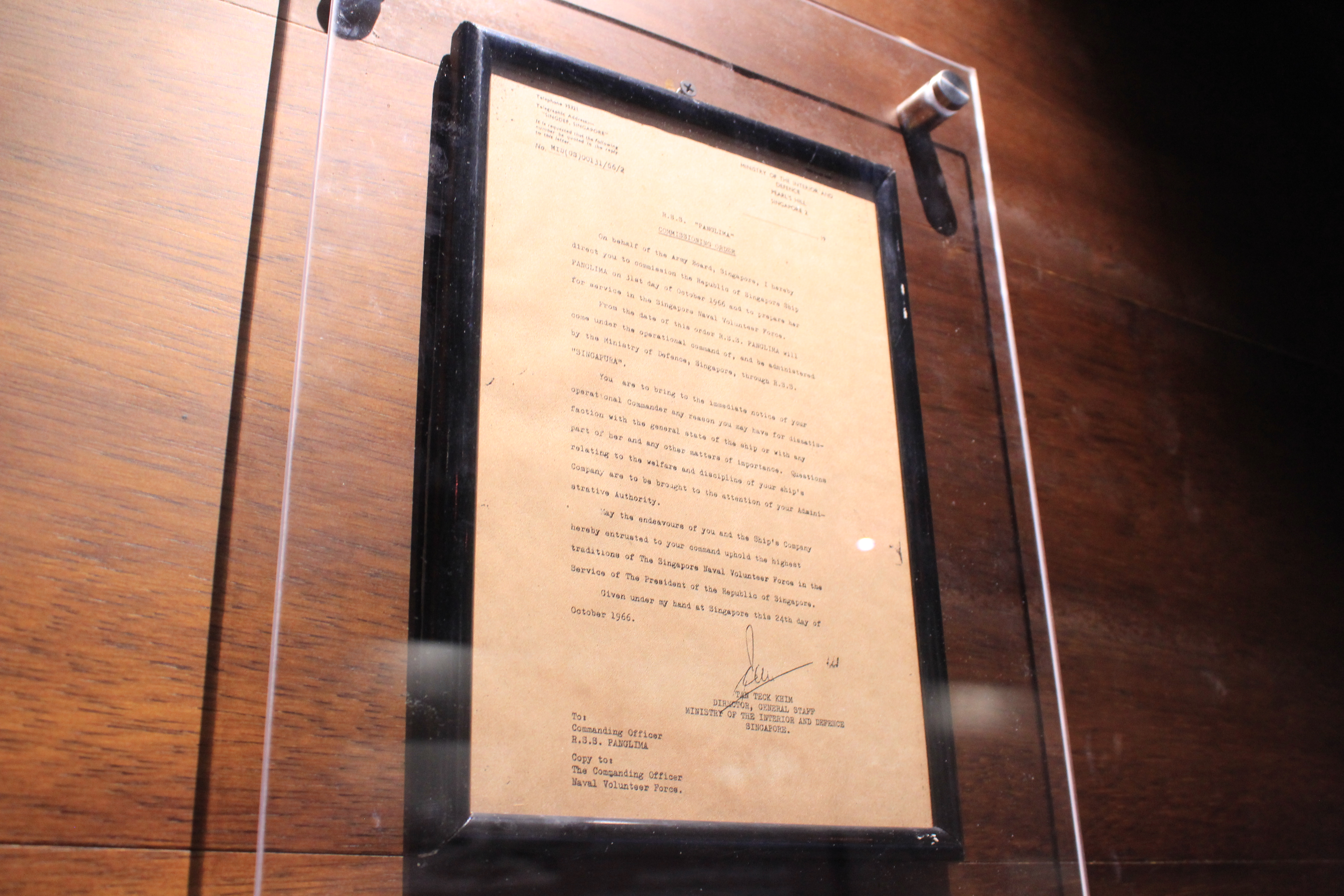
Commissioning order of RSS Panglima into Singaporean service

External image
- Panglima flying the new naval ensign on 5 May 1967; National Archives of Singapore

On 9 August 1965, Singapore separated from Malaysia to form a sovereign republic. The following year on 1 February 1966, the Singapore Volunteer Force was transferred to the republic's Ministry of the Interior and Defence. In early November, KD Panglima was handed over to Singapore and recommissioned as RSS (Republic of Singapore Ship) Panglima.

Under the command of Lieutenant Roland Vivian Simon in 1967, Panglima came across a bumboat being shot at by an Indonesian customs boat, off the island of Pulau Seking (today part of Pulau Semakau). Panglima opened fire on the custom boat's wheelhouse and radar, successfully forcing it to retreat.

With the fall of Saigon in 1975, Vietnamese boat people began entering Singapore waters. Under the command of Captain Ernest H Wickramsingh, Panglima was the first ship to encounter the arrivals and subsequently remained at sea for 23 days during Operation Thunderstorm, past her regular two to three day patrols. Her crew boarded the incoming refugee boats to repair defects and provide supplies.

Panglima became part of the Support Ship Squadron in August 1976. She subsequently underwent a major refit in November 1981 which included providing her bridge with air-conditioning by enclosing it, with the refit being completed in March 1982. The Midshipman School took over the ship in 1983 and thereafter used it exclusively as a training ship. During the 1990 National Day Parade, she participated in Singapore's first post-independence sea review.

== Retirement ==
External image
- Panglima on the day prior to her decommissioning National Archives of Singapore

Panglima was the first RSN ship to be granted a formal decommissioning ceremony. On 9 July 1991, following 35 years of active service across three navies, Panglima was decommissioned in a ceremony officiated by Chief of Navy Commodore Teo Chee Hean held at Brani Naval Base. A minute of silence was observed one minute before sunset, upon which her flags and commissioning pennant were hauled down accompanied by the national anthem. Her final commanding officer, Captain Harry Wee handed the flags to the chief of navy.

While the Ministry of Defence initially considered preserving her as a museum ship, the cost of restoration was estimated to be S$4 million (US$2.32 million) and thereafter S$300,000 (US$173,656.33) per year. Public opinion was split on whether to preserve Panglima, with some highlighting her historical value and others saying it was not worth the cost.

The ship was subsequently sold at auction for S$1,300 (US$798.05) to New West Coast Pte Ltd on 3 April 1992. DBS Land considered purchasing and restoring Panglima as a maritime exhibit or entertainment ship as part of its revitalization plans for Clarke Quay. Its representatives toured the ship on 4 May, but the company eventually decided not to move forward with the plans in August.

== Legacy ==
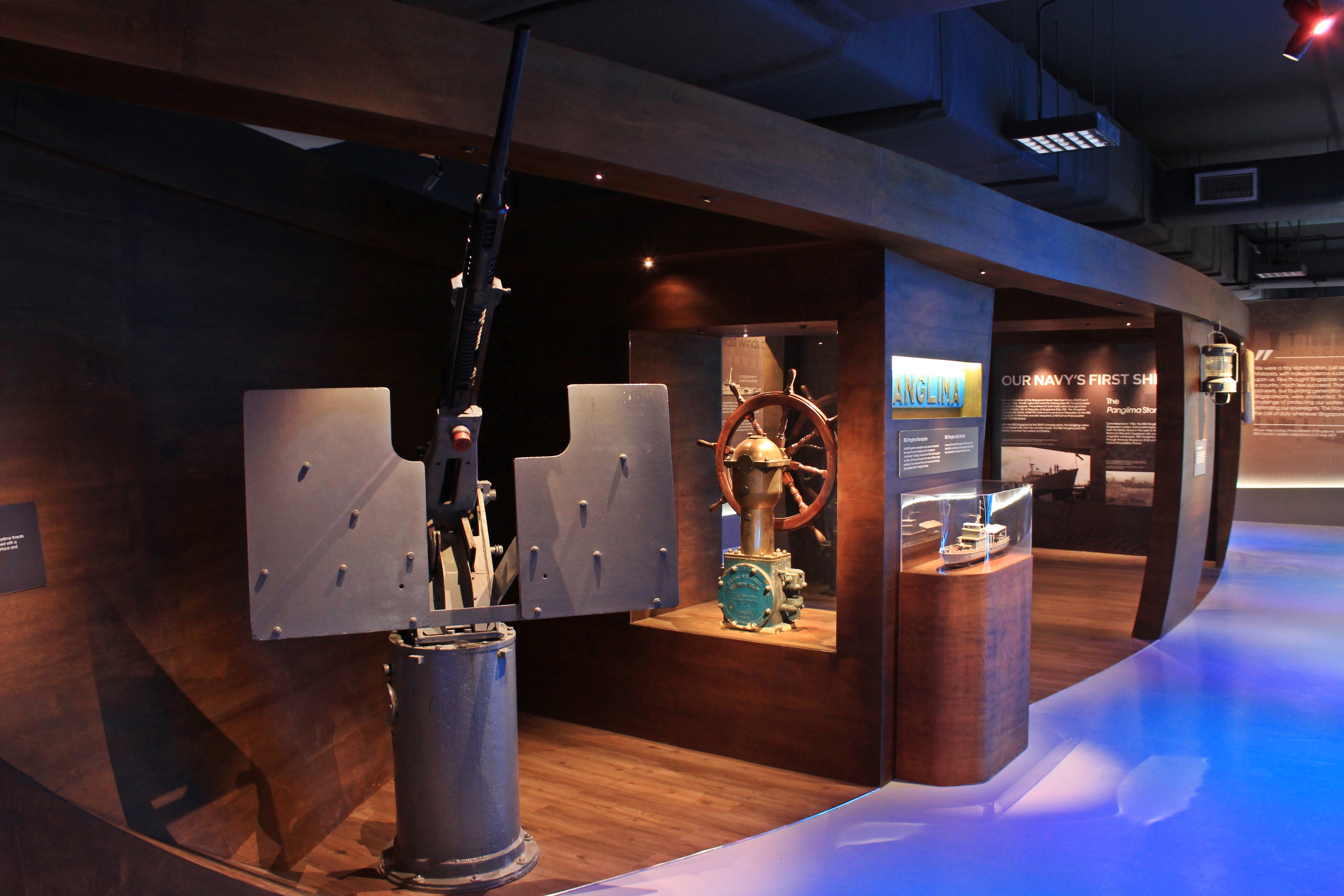
RSS Panglima exhibits in the Navy Museum

The ship's name was transferred to the School of Naval Training and later RSS Panglima-Changi Naval Training Base (CNTB). The CNTB was later renamed the Institute of Maritime Operations & Systems (IMOS) and subsequently the Naval Military Experts Institute (NMI) on 12 July 2013, though it's still referred to as RSS Panglima.

The ship's bell, helms, and 40mm Bofors main gun are on display in the Navy museum within Changi Naval Base.
