= Swift-class patrol craft =

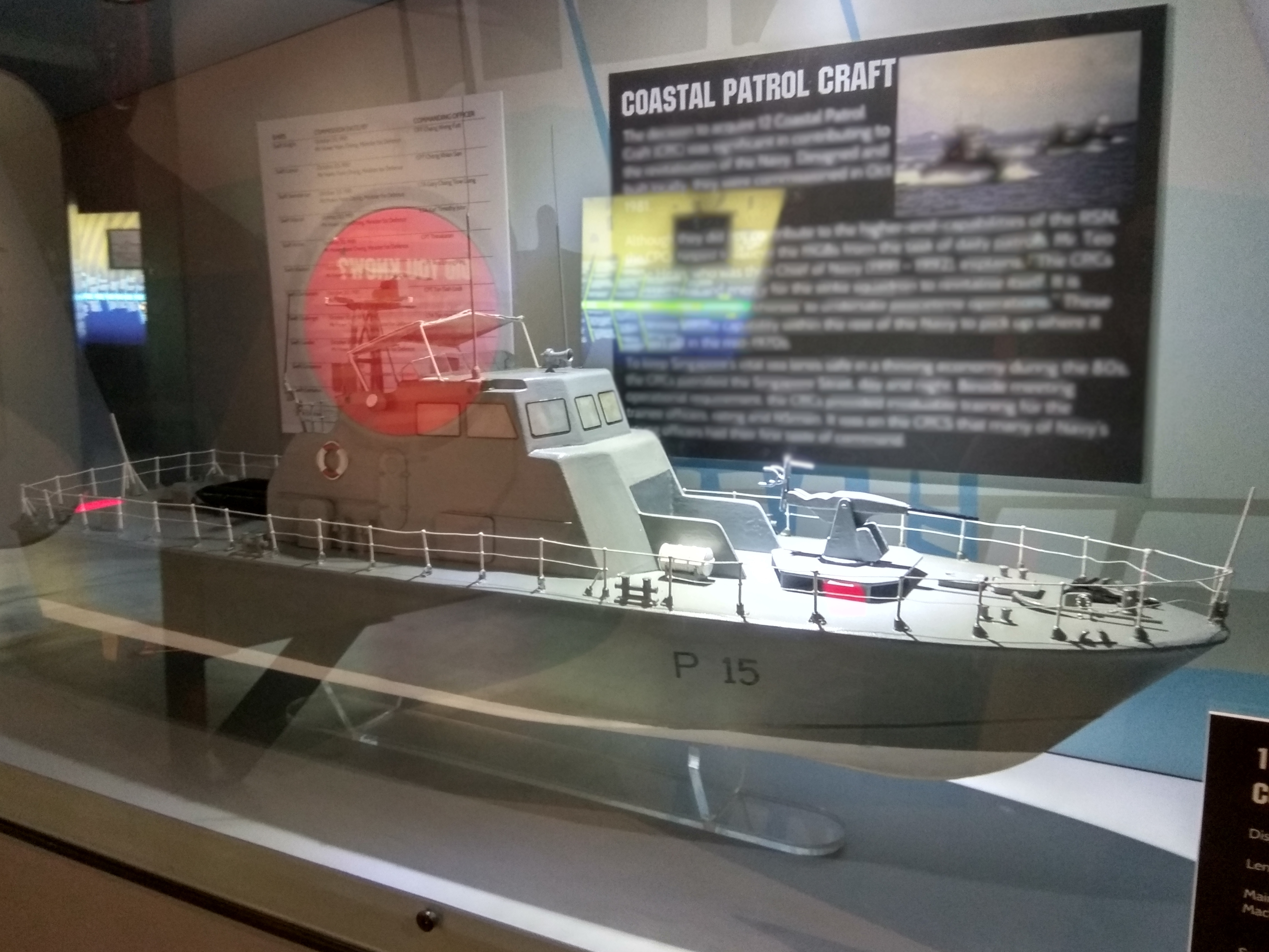
- Model of Swift-class coastal patrol craft

Class overview
- Builders: Singapore Shipbuilding and Engineering, Jurong
- Operators: Republic of Singapore Navy
- Preceded by: Independence class
- Succeeded by: Fearless class
- Built: 1980–81
- Completed: 12
- Active: 5

General characteristics
- Type: Patrol boat
- Displacement: 45.7 long tons (46.4 t)
- Length: 22.7 m (74 ft)
- Beam: 6.2 m (20 ft)
- Draught: 1.6 m (5.2 ft)
- Propulsion: 2 × Deutz SBA 16M816 diesel engines, 2,660 bhp (1,980 kW)
- Speed: 33 kn (61 km/h; 38 mph)
- Range: 900 nmi (1,700 km; 1,000 mi) at 10 kn (19 km/h; 12 mph)
- Complement: 12
- Armament: 1 × 20 mm cannon, 2 × 12.7mm M2 heavy machine guns

The Swift-class coastal patrol craft were a series of patrol vessels built for the Republic of Singapore Navy (RSN) by the Singapore Ship Building and Engineering Company (SBEC).

== History ==
During expansion of the Republic of Singapore Navy's capabilities in the late 1970s, the need for a dedicated coastal patrol platform was identified in order to perform the coastal surveillance and patrol mission. This need was especially apparent in 1975 during Operation Thunderstorm, where RSN resorted to using the Sea Wolf-class missile gun boats to intercept Vietnamese boat people attempting to land in Singapore. This was deemed to be operationally inefficient as it deprived RSN of a critical surface strike asset. As a result, a contract was signed with the SBEC for 12 Coastal Patrol Craft (CPC). The first vessel, RSS Swift Warrior was launched on 8 June 1980 and all 12 vessels were commissioned on 20 October 1981 by then Defence Minister, Mr Howe Yong Chong.

With the transfer of the coastal patrol mission of the Police Coast Guard in 1997, the 12 CPC were transferred and recommissioned in the Police Coast Guard as the Shark class, with the first four officially handed over on 7 May 1993, another four on 24 April 1994, and the last four on 22 January 1997 as part of the formation of the Police Coast Guard Coastal Patrol Squadron.

The CPCs were decommissioned by the Police Coast Guard between 2008 and 2012 as the next generation CPCs were gradually put to service. Five of the decommissioned CPC were transferred to the Indonesian Marine Police or POLAIR on 9 February 2012.

== Design ==
The Swift class are of aluminium construction, with an overall length of 22.7 metres (74 ft), with a beam of 6.2 metres (20 ft) and a draught of 1.6 metres (5.2 ft). Displacement was 45.7 long tons (46.4 t) full load. The ships are powered by two Deutz SBA-16M816 diesel engines with a total power of 2,660 brake horsepower (1,980 kW) and driving two propeller shafts, for a maximum speed of 33 knots (61 km/h; 38 mph). 8.6 tons of fuel is carried, giving a range of 550 nautical miles (1,020 km; 630 mi) at 20 knots (37 km/h; 23 mph) or 900 nautical miles (1,700 km; 1,000 mi) at 10 knots (19 km/h; 12 mph).

Armament consists of a single 20 mm cannon and two machine guns. The ships carried a crew of 3 officers and 9 other ranks.
