= Republic of Singapore Navy =

Naval service branch of the Singapore Armed Forces

- Angkatan Laut Republik Singapura (Malay) 新加坡海军部队 (Chinese) சிங்கப்பூர் கடல் படை (Tamil)
- Crest of the Republic of Singapore Navy
- Founded: 5 May 1967; 59 years ago
- Country: Singapore
- Type: Navy
- Role: Naval warfare
- Size: 4,000 active personnel 5,000 reserve personnel 40 ships
- Part of: Singapore Armed Forces
- Garrison/HQ: Changi Naval Base
- Motto: "Beyond Horizons"
- March: "Republic of Singapore Navy March"
- Ships: 32 surface ships; 6 submarines; 1 submarine support and rescue vessel; 1 training ship
- Engagements: See list: Operation Thunderstorm International Force East Timor Operation Flying Eagle Multi-National Force – Iraq Combined Task Force 150 Combined Task Force 151 Operation Prosperity Guardian
- Website: Official website

Commanders
- President of Singapore: Tharman Shanmugaratnam
- Minister for Defence: Chan Chun Sing
- Chief of Defence Force: VADM Aaron Beng
- Chief of Navy: RADM Sean Wat
- Master Chief Navy: SWO Seck Wai Kong

Insignia
- Pennant

- Ensign

- Jack

- State Colour

- Logo

The Republic of Singapore Navy (RSN) is the maritime service branch of the Singapore Armed Forces (SAF) responsible for defending the country against any seaborne threats and as a guarantor of its sea lines of communications. The RSN traces its origins to the Royal Navy when Singapore was still a crown colony of the British Empire. The service was formally established in 1967, two years after its independence from Malaysia in 1965, and had undergone a substantial modernisation.

The RSN also regularly conducts operations with the navies of its neighbouring countries to combat piracy and terrorist threats in the congested littoral waters of the Strait of Malacca and Singapore. It also jointly operates the Fokker 50 maritime patrol aircraft with its counterparts from the Republic of Singapore Air Force (RSAF) to provide air surveillance of the seaward approaches to Singapore, which is one of the busiest sealanes in the world. The RSN has engaged in international anti-piracy operations further abroad, partaking in the multinational Combined Task Force 151 off the Gulf of Aden.

Though numerically small in comparison to its much larger neighbours in terms of tonnage and manpower reserves, the RSN counteracts by continuously seeking to maintain a qualitative superiority over any adversary through the implementation of new technologies, fostering of alliances with extra-regional navies, and increased reliance on automation and unmanned assets. This has made the RSN one of the most sophisticated and well trained navies in the region. In addition, bilateral exercises with foreign navies are also held regularly.

== Mission ==
The economy and defence are closely interlinked... We need the sea lanes to Singapore to be opened; hence a capable navy is crucial.

— Founding Prime Minister Lee Kuan Yew

As an island nation, the RSN forms part of Singapore's first line of defence. Its stated mission objectives are to:

- Protect Singapore's sealine of communications and contribute to regional peace and security.
- Maintain continuous surveillance on the Singapore Strait to prevent sea robberies, piracy, terrorism and unwanted incursions during peacetime.
- Work to secure a swift and decisive victory over any enemy at sea during war.
- Conduct diplomacy by exercising with foreign navies and taking part in international operations for peace support, humanitarian assistance and disaster relief.

== History ==
=== Colonial and pre-independence era ===
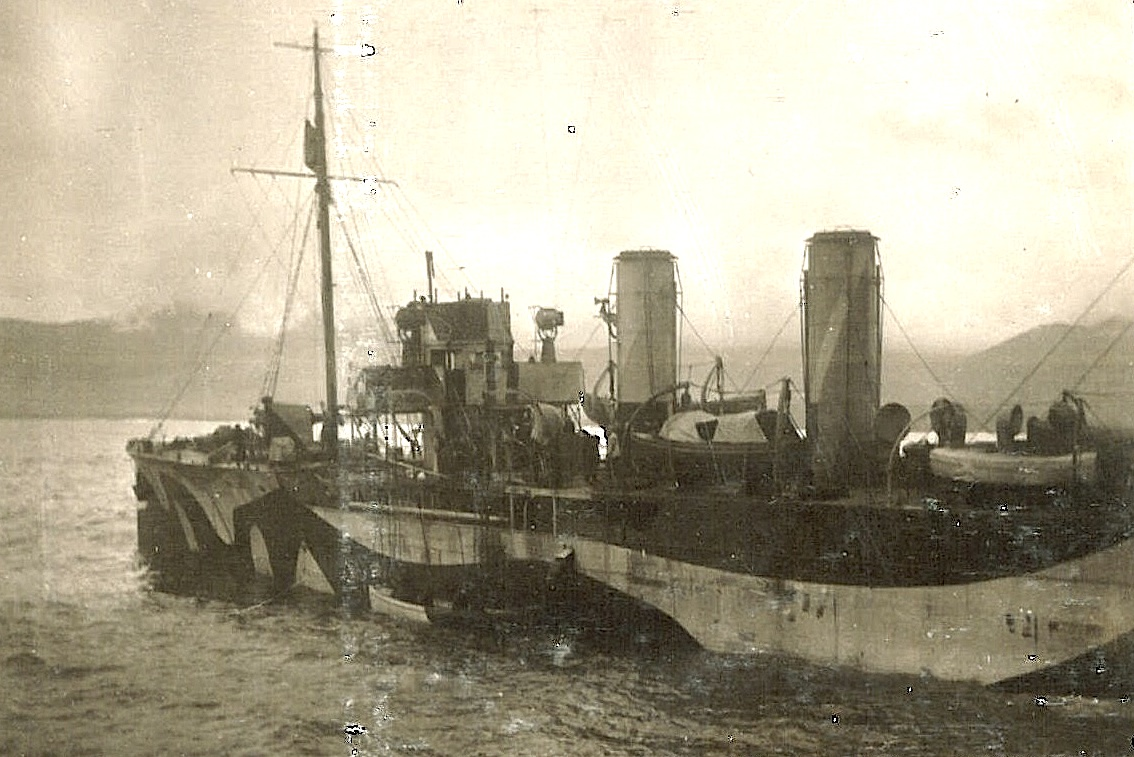
HMS Laburnum served in the SSRNVR until she was scuttled during the fall of Singapore in World War II.

The Republic of Singapore Navy traces its origins to the Royal Navy in the 1930s with only two patrol craft. The Straits Settlements Royal Naval Volunteer Reserve (SSRNVR) was established on 27 April 1934, and in 1941 became the Singaporean division of the Malayan Royal Naval Volunteer Reserve (MRNVR) during World War II. The service received several 75' motor launches built locally by John I. Thornycroft & Company Shipyard in Tanjong Rhu: HMS Pahlawan and the first HMS Panglima in 1937; the latter would later be sunk during the fall of Singapore in February 1942. A new 90' motor vessel bearing the name Panglima was launched in 1944, but upon its transfer to the MRNVR in 1948, proved unsuited for tropical waters and began deteriorating rapidly.

In 1948, the Malayan Force was raised by the Singaporean government, and was later granted the title of the Royal Malayan Navy in 1952 in recognition of its services in action during the Malayan Emergency. The third and final Panglima was launched in January 1956 to replace the second vessel. Being more technologically advanced than her predecessors, she became an indispensable part of the local fleet.

On 16 September 1963, Singapore was admitted as a state of Malaysia under the terms of confederation and the Royal Malayan Navy was renamed the Royal Malaysian Navy. The Singapore division of the MRNVR was formally transferred from the command of the Royal Navy to the Royal Malaysian Navy on 22 September 1963, becoming the Singapore Volunteer Force. During the Indonesia–Malaysia confrontation, Singapore-based ships were charged with defending the southern border against infiltrators and saboteurs, and also undertook local minor engagements against the Indonesian Navy.

=== Independence of Singapore ===
On 9 August 1965, Singapore seceded from Malaysia to form an independent republic inside the Commonwealth. The SVF became the de facto naval force of the new state, though it remained under the command of the Royal Malaysian Navy. Three ships remained in Singapore after separation: KD Singapura, a captured Japanese minelayer; KD Bedok, a patrol boat from Malaysia; and KD Panglima, the former Royal Navy inshore patrol boat built in 1956. (Note: The official RSN anniversary books and website states that only Bedok and Panglima formed the initial navy, omitting the Singapura for unknown reasons despite it being one of three ships transferred to Singapore.) Panglima was recommissioned as a Singaporean ship on 1 January 1966. On 1 February, the service ceased to be under Malaysia and became the Singapore Naval Volunteer Force (SNVF); Bedok and Singapura were also recommissioned and the latter became a floating headquarters.

Now that the new white ensign of our own young country will fly here and in our ships, I hope that you will all remember that its reputation is in your hands.

— Executive Officer Jaswant Singh Gill inaugurating the SNVF on 5 May 1967 at the Telok Ayer Basin

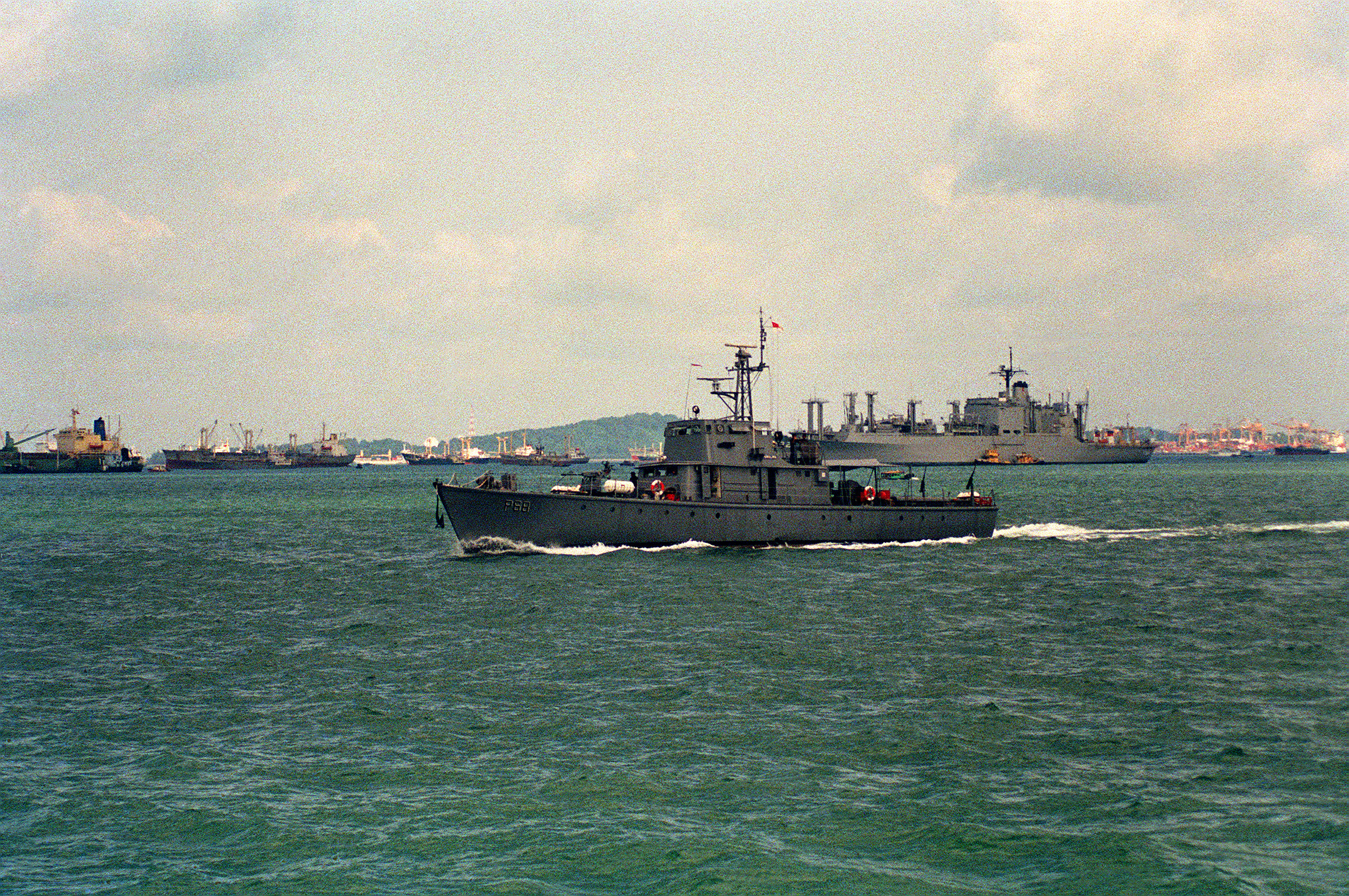
RSS Panglima, first ship of the RSN, underway in 1988 as a training ship; she was decommissioned in 1991.

A new naval ensign was hoisted at the Telok Ayer Basin for the first time on 5 May 1967 and is marked as the day of the Navy's official establishment. (Note: The RSN claims the date as the day of their official establishment and commemorates Navy Day on 5 May every year.) In September, the service was renamed the People's Defence Force – Sea and placed under the Sea Defence Command, with the command being thereafter renamed the Maritime Command in December. The name changes reflected the internal restructuring within the Singapore Armed Forces and the growing realisation that maritime security was a crucial element to national security. Headquarters was shifted ashore to Pulau Belakang Mati (now Sentosa Island) in 1968. In order to develop local expertise in seamanship and naval engineering, 160 naval recruits underwent training by Royal New Zealand Navy instructors in 1969. At the same time, aspiring officers were sent overseas to learn from established navies in Australia, Britain, Canada and New Zealand.

The Maritime Command launched an expansion program with the objectives of combating sea robberies and smuggling, and improving seaward power projection. In June 1968, six Independence-class patrol crafts were purchased and commissioned between 1970 and 1972, marking the first purpose-built ships the Navy possessed. Part of the urgency stemmed from British prime minister Harold Wilson's intention to withdraw British troops East of Suez by 1971, which would leave a security vacuum, though a smaller British presence eventually remained under the Five Power Defence Arrangements. Growing constraints and strategic need for a base located nearer to the strait was solved by the opening of Brani Naval Base in December 1974. The foresight was validated a few weeks later when terrorists from the Japanese Red Army attacked an oil complex on Pulau Bukom and hijacked the Laju ferry. Four vessels, RSS Sea Hawk, RSS Independence, RSS Sovereignty and RSS Daring together with the Marine Police, were able to surround the fleeing ferry and prevent it from escaping.

Colonel James Aeria would be the final commander of the Maritime Command. On 1 April 1975, the Maritime Command was renamed the Republic of Singapore Navy as part of the reorganisation of the Singapore Armed Forces into three distinct services, and has kept the name ever since.

=== Fleet modernisation ===
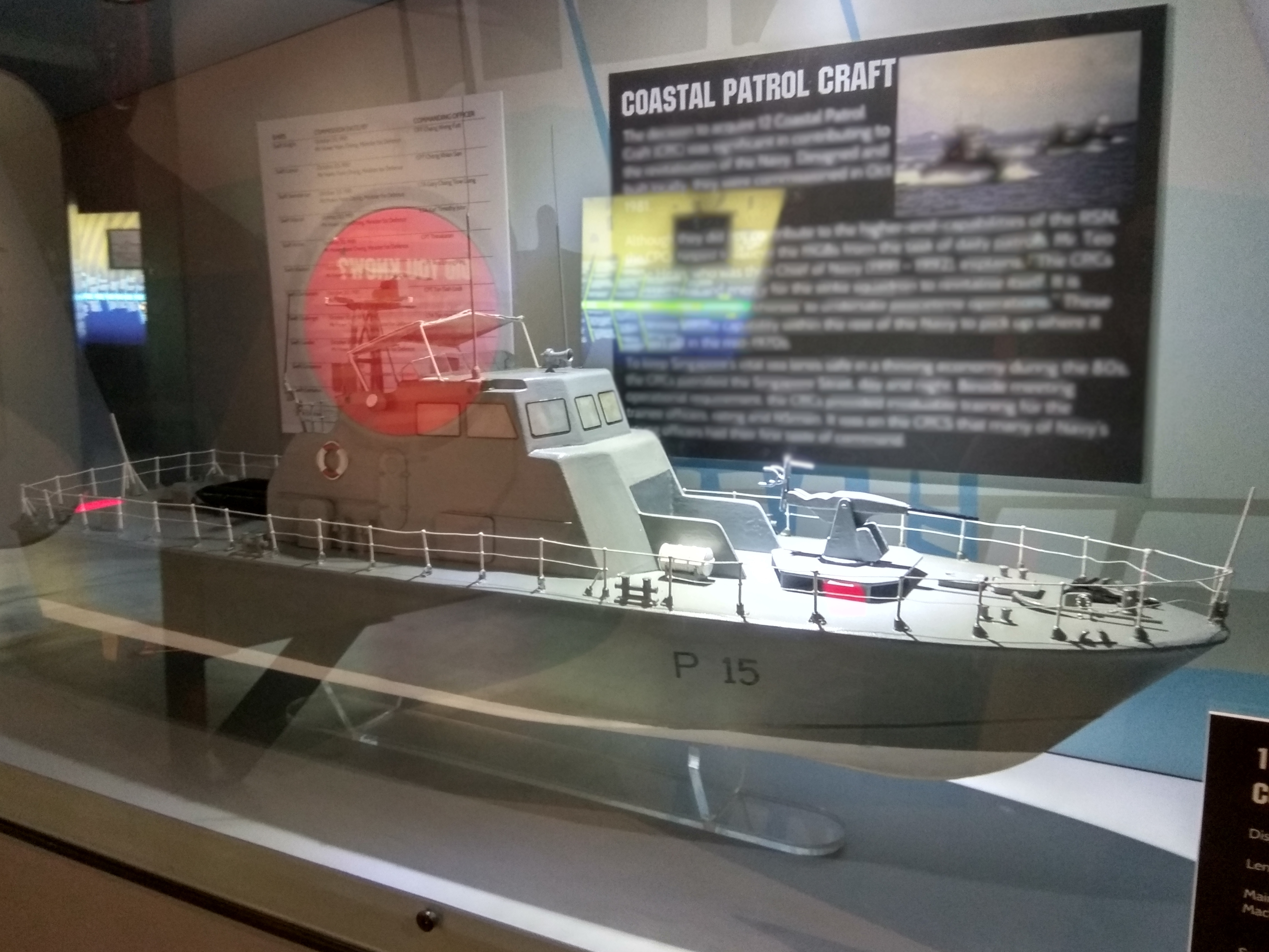
Model of a Swift-class coastal patrol craft

The RSN was the first navy in the region to successfully fire a live anti-ship missile when RSS Sea Wolf fired two Gabriel missiles in March 1974. From 1975 to 1976, six Sea Wolf-class missile gunboats were commissioned, which proved vital during Operation Thunderstorm when they were deployed to patrol and apprehend the influx of boat people fleeing the fall of South Vietnam. In order to support sealift operations, six County-class tank landing ships were purchased from the United States; these were popularly referred to as dollars ships due to the price ($1) paid for each vessel. Two Bluebird-class minesweepers were also transferred from the United States to combat the threat of mine warfare within the narrow and shallow channels of the Singapore Strait. Prior to this, the SAF Diving Center had already been established in 1971 to train the first batch of frogman recruits in conducting underwater mine disposal operations. In 1975, the service was reformed as the Naval Diving Unit and based at Sembawang Camp, where it remains.

During the latter half of the decade, the increased operational demands and rate of patrols led the Navy to seek three additional missile gunboats and an upgrade to the Harpoon missile for the existing fleet under Project Albatross. Due to budgetary constraints in the early 1980s, Defence Minister Howe Yoon Chong decided to allocate more funds to the Air Force for the acquisition of a squadron of F-16s; the fighter jets were deemed to possess a higher strategic strike value and capable of more diverse roles compared to ships. Howe claimed the Navy's function was best relegated to coastal defence and suggested mounting Oerlikon guns on towed barges as a replacement to guard the nation's maritime borders. Nevertheless, the reduced budget was still sufficient to commission twelve Swift-class coastal patrol craft which freed the missile gunboats from daily patrols for more strategic operations.

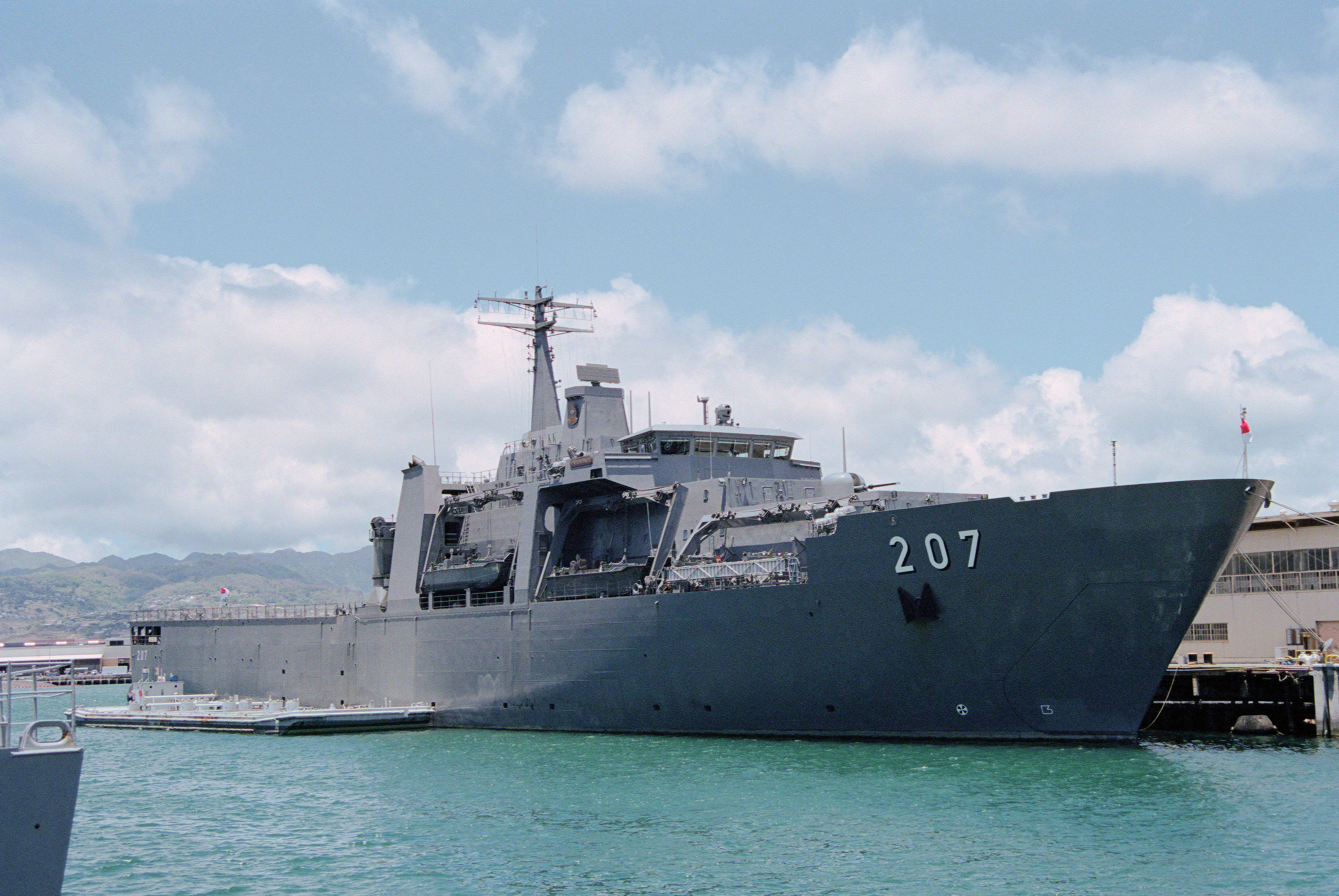
RSS Endurance berthed at Pearl Harbor while en route to Fleet Week 2000 in New York City; she was the first RSN ship to circumnavigate the globe.

With the Navy being the lowest priority among the three services, it saw little hope of an expanded fleet with a larger stake in Singapore's defence and many people left the service. This created a "crisis of confidence" within the RSN in the next few years, which defence planners regarded as lacking a proper doctrine for existence beyond patrols and tackling illegal immigration. It was not until 1984 that naval officials convinced the government of the necessity of a seagoing fleet to secure the nation's sea lines of communication in the Malacca Strait and South China Sea, both of which lead to the Port of Singapore; a major contributor to the economy. To combat the growing technological obsolescence and decline in morale, the government launched the "Navy 2000" program. The service underwent an internal restructuring with the formation of the Coastal Command (COSCOM) in 1988 and the Fleet in 1989, formalising the responsibilities of each class of ship. Between 1990 and 2001, the resurgent navy acquired six Victory-class missile corvettes, twelve Fearless-class patrol vessels, four Endurance-class landing ship tanks, and also commissioned four secondhand Challenger-class submarines from Sweden to hone its underwater domain skills.

In 1979, Malaysia published a map laying claim to Pedra Branca, an offshore island controlled by Singapore. The resultant Pedra Branca dispute lasted 29 years until 2008 when the island was awarded to Singapore by the International Court of Justice, during which the Navy was heavily involved in patrols and maintained an active presence in the waters surrounding the island. In January 2003, RSS Courageous collided with a merchant vessel within the vicinity of Pedra Branca during a patrol, resulting in four casualties and the first ship to be stricken as a total loss. As a result of the accident, additional safety measures were implemented and the training program enhanced, including the requirement for all officers to better understand the manoeuvring characteristics of their ship and take a COLREGs test every six months.

The RSN had also participated in operations other than war within Southeast Asia and abroad. The Navy deployed its Bedok-class mine-countermeasure vessels to search the Musi River for SilkAir Flight 185; served as part of the Australian-led International Force East Timor to address the humanitarian and security crisis in the aftermath of the territory's referendum for independence in 1999; deployed three ships to provide humanitarian assistance and emergency aid to the Indonesian town of Meulaboh in the aftermath of the 2004 Indian Ocean earthquake; and was part of the Multi-National Force – Iraq coalition force maintaining maritime security around key Iraqi installations in the Persian Gulf.

=== Evolving security challenges ===
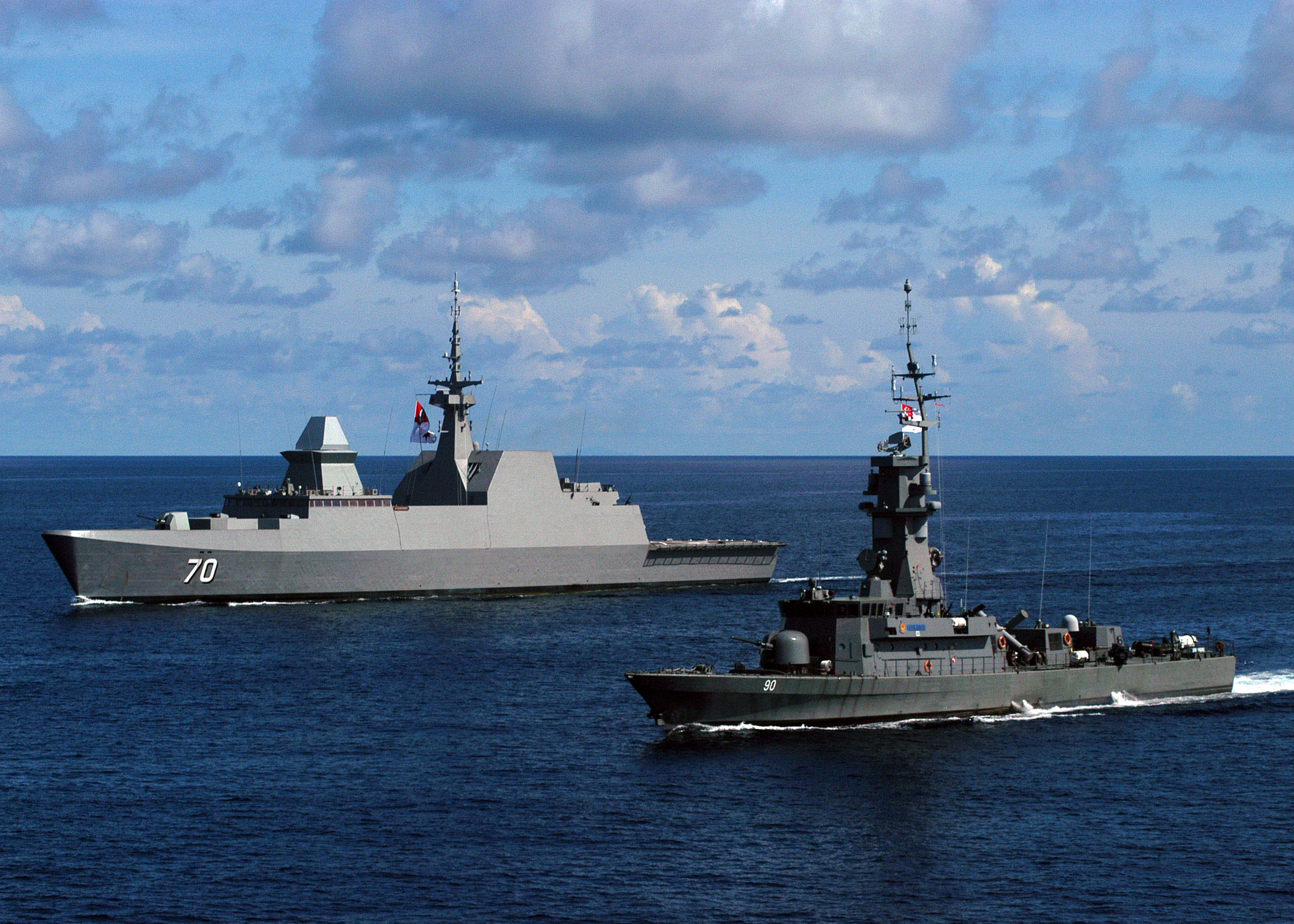
RSS Steadfast and RSS Vigilance sailing line abreast during CARAT Singapore 2010.

The Coastal Command was revamped in 2009 into the Maritime Security Task Force to improve coordination between national maritime agencies such as the Police Coast Guard and harbour authorities. Between 2007 and 2020, the RSN has introduced new Archer-class submarines, Formidable-class frigates and Independence-class littoral mission vessels to its fleet to enhance its deterrence amidst rising tensions in the surrounding seas. Unmanned assets such as the Specialised Marine Craft patrol boat and Protector USV have been commissioned to combat the personnel shortfall in Singapore due to falling birthrates.

The RSN has engaged in multilateral anti-piracy operations in the Malacca Strait with neighbouring nations; and in the Gulf of Aden and Horn of Africa under the multinational naval Combined Task Force 151, taking command of the task force thrice; It participated in both the search for MH Flight 370 in the Gulf of Thailand and QZ Flight 8501 in the Karimata Strait in 2014. In an analysis of the SAF humanitarian response to Typhoon Haiyan in 2013, Defence Minister Ng Eng Hen noted that the disruption of communications on the ground underscored the need for a platform which could provide "centralised ability for command and control" in the air.

The RSN celebrated its 50th anniversary in 2017 and hosted an international fleet review, with twenty nations participating.

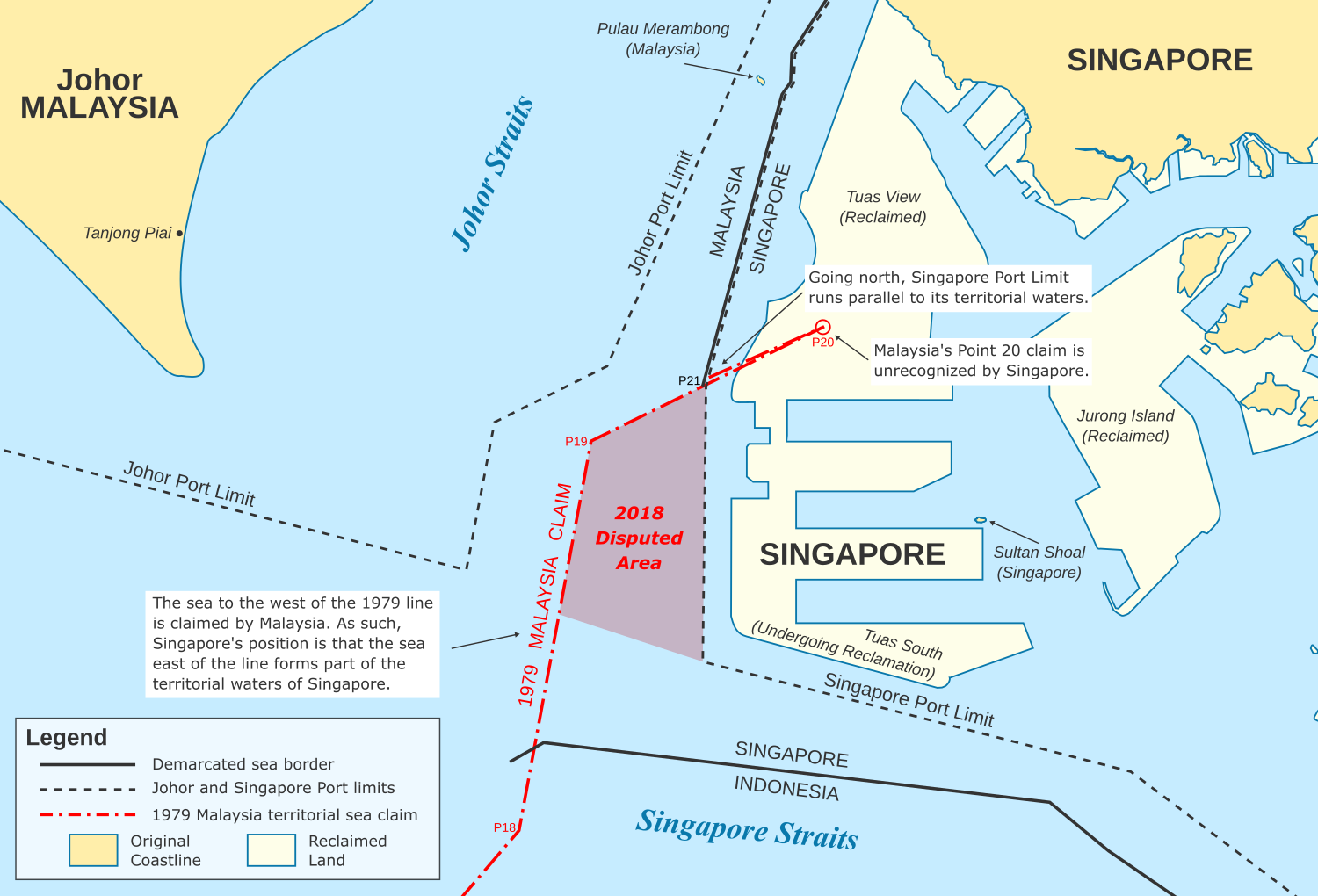
Map of the Tuas maritime dispute showing Malaysia's new claims going beyond its 1979 maritime line.

In October 2018, Malaysia extended its Johor Bahru port limits past its 1979 maritime claims into waters off the reclaimed Tuas sector which Singapore claims as its own. Singapore responded by extending its port limits to overlap with Malaysia's new port limits. As Malaysia deployed elements of the Malaysia Coast Guard and government ships to enforce their claims, the RSN's littoral mission vessels were stationed on location 24/7 with the Police Coast Guard. Both side eventually suspended the overlapping port limits and withdrew from the area following successful negotiations.

The Navy underwent a comprehensive restructuring in June 2020 which dissolved all the existing squadrons, reorganising each class of ship into its separate flotilla. The Maritime Security Task Force was restructured, with the newly created Sea Security Group and Force Protection Group placed under it.

=== Future procurement plans ===
The RSN launched its first newly built Invincible-class submarine in 2019, with the second and third submarines RSS Impeccable and RSS Illustrious launched on 13 December 2022. All three submarines will be expected to be commissioned in 2023, with an operationalisation date set for 2024. The fourth submarine, RSS Inimitable, was launched in 2024 and will undergo sea trials before delivery to the Navy. In March 2025, Defence Minister Ng Eng Hen announced a plan for the Singapore Armed Forces to purchase 2 additional Invincible-Class submarines, bringing the total number of submarines purchased to six, up from four previously. MINDEF announced the signing of the contract to purchase the additional submarines from Thyssenkrupp Marine Systems on May 8.

The contract for the procurement for six multi-role combat vessels (MRCV) was signed with ST Engineering Marine Ltd on 28 March 2023 while procurements plans for the drone-laden Joint Multi-Mission Ships (JMSS) are ongoing. The MRCVs will act as a 'mothership' for unmanned assets and host mine-countermeasure Venus-16 USVs, while the JMSS will increase the RSN's aviation capabilities in supporting disaster relief operations. A new class of patrol vessels to operate alongside the existing littoral mission vessels are to enter service in 2026.

== Organisation ==
Organisational chart of the RSN

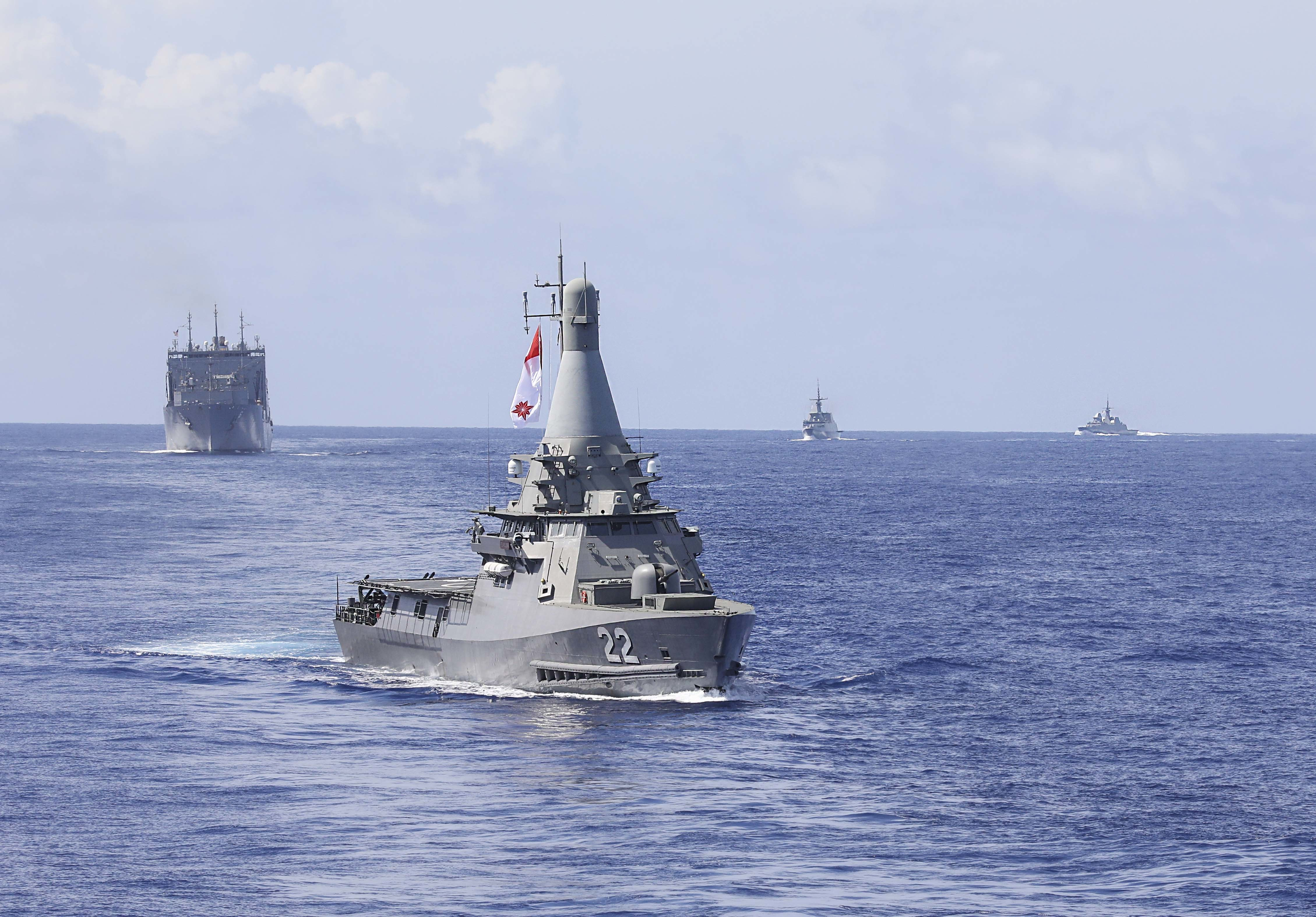
RSS Fearless and other RSN ships in an exercise with the USN during Pacific Griffin

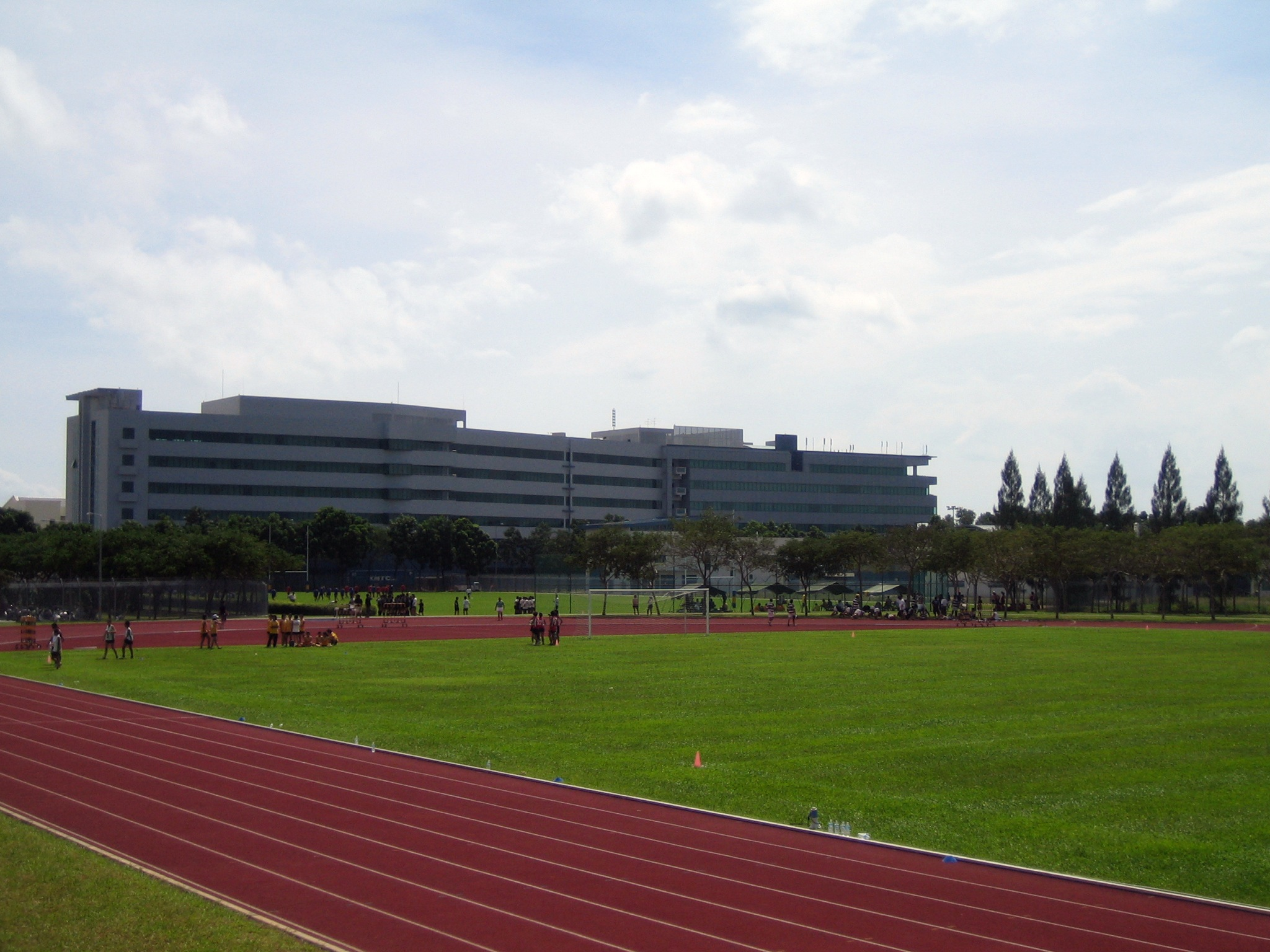
Naval Military Experts Institute in the background of the sports complex within Changi Naval Base

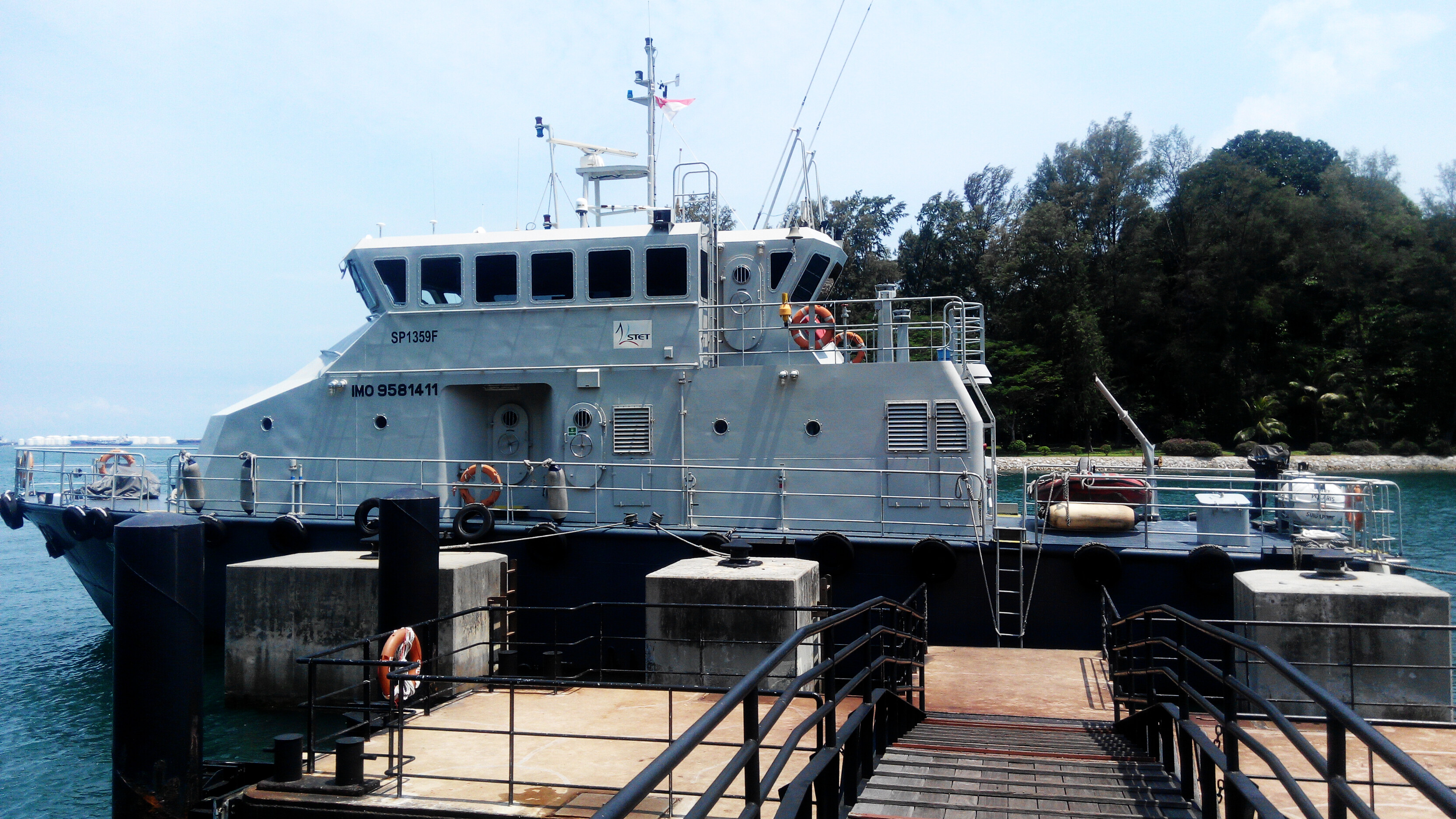
STET Polaris berthed at Sisters' Islands in 2015

=== Command structure ===
The Republic of Singapore Navy is led by the Chief of Navy (CNV), who reports directly to the Chief of Defence Force (CDF). The CNV is responsible for the RSN's overall operational capabilities and administration. The organisational chart shows the peacetime administrative chain of command with five formations: the Fleet, Maritime Security Command, Naval Engineering and Logistics Command, Naval Diving Unit, and the Maritime Training and Doctrine Command.

The current Chief of Navy is Rear Admiral Sean Wat, who took over command on 10 March 2023.

=== Operating forces ===
==== Fleet ====
The Fleet is responsible for operations beyond the Singapore Strait and represents the main strike arm of the navy. Its frigates and missile corvettes are capable of conducting anti-surface, anti-air and anti-submarine operations with their equipped armaments and sensors. Its landing ships tank and civil resource vessels provide sea transportation and logistics support overseas, while the submarines force provides a subsurface capability for the navy.

The fleet consists of four flotillas:

- 1st Flotilla
- 3rd Flotilla
- 7th Flotilla
- 8th Flotilla

==== Maritime Security Command ====
The Maritime Security Task Force (MSTF) is a SAF-level standing task force formed after the restructuring of Coastal Command. Its role is to ensure Singapore's maritime security and act as a co-ordinating agency for all national maritime agencies to allow for the seamless execution of maritime security operations.

MSTF consists of two groups and an Information Fusion Centre:

- MSTF's Sea Security Group
- Force Protection Group
- Information Fusion Centre

Maritime Security Command (MARSEC) consists of four flotillas:

- 2nd Flotilla
- 6th Flotilla
- 9th Flotilla
- Maritime Security and Response Flotilla

==== Naval Engineering and Logistics Command ====
The Naval Engineering and Logistics Command (NELCOM) is responsible for up-keeping and planning the maintenance schedules of ships and the equipping of supplies and assets. It also conducts weapons readiness checks on ships and works closely with the Defence Science and Technology Agency and ST Electronics.

NELCOM consists of three squadrons:

- Force Readiness Squadron
- Force Generation Squadron
- Force Support Squadron

==== Naval Diving Unit ====
The Naval Diving Unit is charged with "explosive ordnance disposal, underwater mine demolition and commando-type missions". Its personnel are considered among the elite forces of Singapore.

NDU consists of six units:

- Special Warfare Group
- Special Boat Group
- Clearance Diving Group
- Underwater Demolition Group
- 180 Squadron
- Frogman School

==== Maritime Training and Doctrine Command ====
Maritime Training and Doctrine Command (MTDC) consists of two institutes:

- Naval Military Experts Institute
- Maritime Warfare and Doctrine Institute

=== Training ===
As with the army and air force, all officers of the navy are trained and commissioned at the Officer Cadet School with their interservice counterparts. As midshipmen, part of their training involves being deployed four weeks at sea with the regular fleet to hone their skills in leadership, navigation and basic seamanship. Navy officers are also offered specialisation courses later in their careers at the Naval Officers' Advanced Schools (NAS) which is part of the SAF Advanced School (SAS). The courses offered are Naval Advanced Officer Course (NAOC), Mine Hunting Officer Course (MHOC), Naval Warfare Officer Course (NWOC) and Command Preparatory Programme (CPP).

Enlisted specialists and regular military experts (ratings) are instructed in their specialised domains at the Naval Military Experts Institute, under the Maritime Training and Doctrine Command (MTDC), based at Changi Naval Base. This training consists of all the key aspects of the duties the sailors are expected to perform on board the ships. This includes basic firefighting and damage control skills, rope handling and seamanship skills as well as shiphandling which is done through a ship simulator allowing trainees to practice their watchkeeping skills inside a safe, controlled environment. The enlisted specialists and military experts undergo a rigorous and realistic Summative Exercise (SUMEX) at the end of their course prior to joining the operational ships.

The RSN has also partnered with ST Education and Training to operate the training ship STET Polaris since 2010. Polaris was specially constructed with a "dual bridge" to facilitate training requirements for two navigation teams to operate simultaneously and can carry 30 trainees and instructors; the ship was named after the North Star, which mariners had traditionally used as a navigational reference point in ancient times.

While submarine training was initially conducted in Sweden by the Royal Swedish Navy, training for submariners are now conducted locally in Singapore. Submariners are trained at the Submarine Training Centre (STC) also known as RSS Challenger, named after the first submarine acquired by the RSN. It is located in Changi Naval Base and is designed to be a state-of-the-art facility featuring submarine simulators in order to enhance the realism and effectiveness of submarine training. Training in the simulators can be up to several days in order to simulate actual deployments when the submariners are training in the STC. Prospective submariners are put through a nine-month-long course which consists of a series of tough tests in order to ensure that every qualified submariner is able to meet operational requirements at sea. The simulators housed in the facility are known as the Submarine Steering and Diving Trainer (SSDT) and Submarine Combat Tactical Trainer (SCTT). The two simulators allow the flotilla to conduct training that closely simulates at-sea conditions without the logistical costs involved in deploying submarines out at sea. The SSDT is designed based on the Archer-class submarine and trains the helmsman to steer the submarine as well as the diving officer in diving the submarine while allowing the "Officer of the Watch" to oversee the entire process. The SCTT is designed to train the submariners in combat operations, which consists of four consoles modelled after those installed on board the actual submarines. These are used to train the crew in submarine combat operations such as analysis, surveillance, command and control, and weapons control.

Singapore is also known to have sent prospective submarine Commanding Officers for the Royal Netherlands Navy Submarine Command Course as well as the German Navy Submarine Commanding Officer Course. A training suite for crew members of the new Invincible class submarines is now being developed, which is planned to operationalise by 2024. Like the previous simulators before it, it will consist of the combat trainer as well as diving and steering trainer among others. It will additionally feature a virtual procedural trainer that replicates the submarine with all its more than 12 million parts, that offers both physical and tactile training opportunities for the crew members while ashore.

Enlistees to the Naval Diving Unit are selected based on their eyesight and medical fitness and trained at Frogman School located within Sembawang Camp. Trainees are required to pass a vocational assessment prior to beginning nine weeks of basic military training. Those who qualify then undergo the twenty weeks Combat Diver Course where they are taught dive theory and must qualify for drown proofing, pool competency and survival skills requirements.

== Current fleet ==
=== Frigates ===
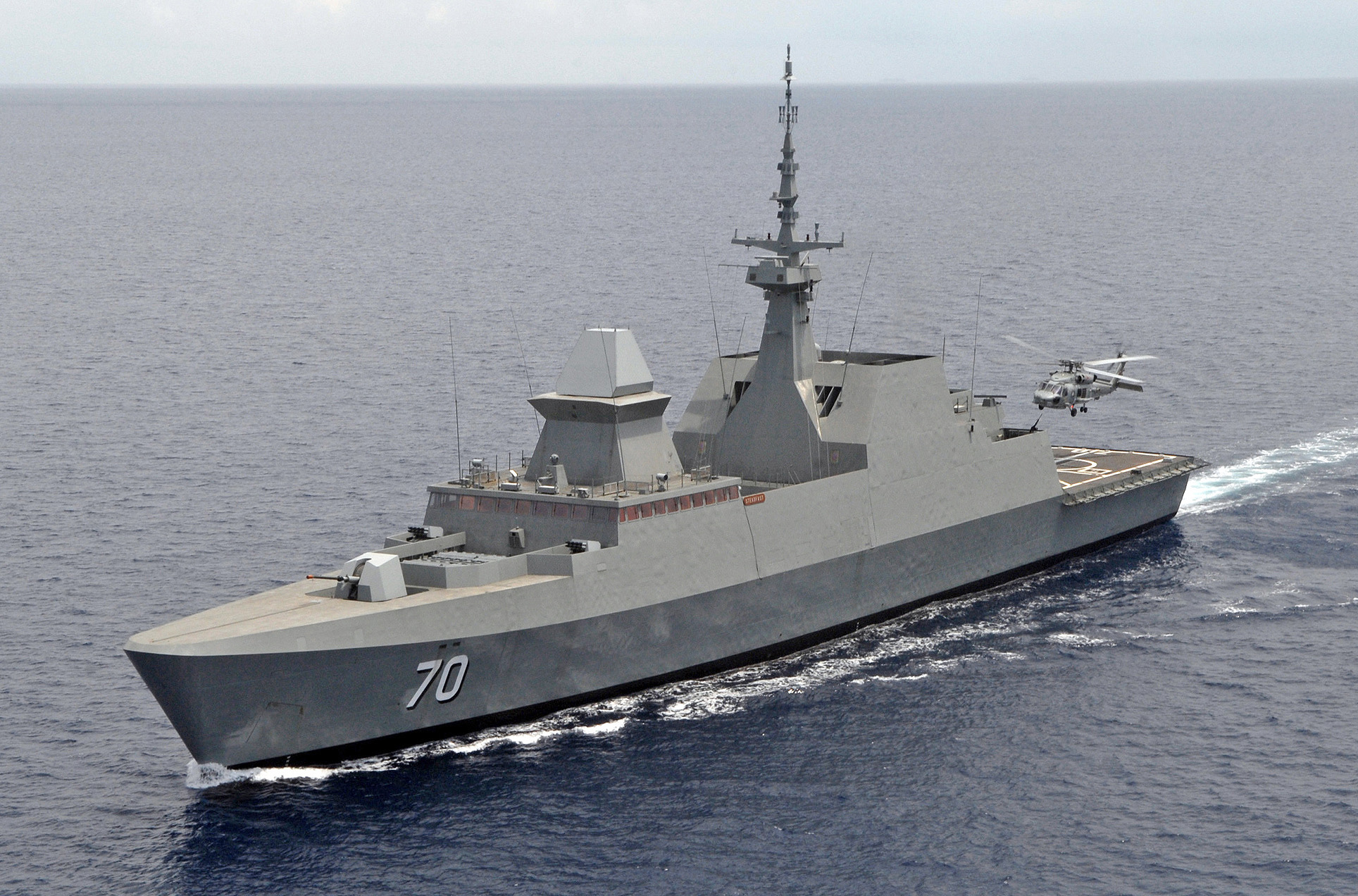
RSS Steadfast with a USN SH-60B Seahawk helicopter during flight deck qualifications

The Formidable-class multi-role stealth frigates entered service with the RSN in 2007 and are derivatives of the French Navy's La Fayette-class frigate. The frigates are key information nodes and fighting units, and were, at time of launch, "by far the most advanced surface combatants in Southeast Asia" with a special surface-to-air missile configuration which combines the Thales Herakles radar with the Sylver A50 launcher and a mix of MBDA Aster 15 and 30 missiles. Other armaments include Boeing Harpoon missiles and an OTO Melara 76 mm gun for surface defence. The Blue Spear SSM is planned to be equipped on board the Formidable class Frigates on completion of the mid-life upgrade program.

Equipped with Sikorsky S-70B naval helicopters, an international derivative of the Sikorsky SH-60B Seahawk. These naval helicopters feature anti-surface and anti-submarine combat systems, extending the ship's own surveillance and over-the-horizon targeting and anti-submarine warfare capabilities. The naval helicopters are part of the 123 squadron of the RSAF and piloted by air force pilots. Two more S-70B helicopters were ordered in February 2013.

The lead ship of the class, RSS Formidable was built overseas in Lorient, France and commissioned locally on 5 May 2007, marking the 40th anniversary of the RSN. The final two ships, RSS Stalwart and RSS Supreme were commissioned on 16 January 2009. The six frigates form the First Flotilla of the RSN.

=== Littoral mission vessels ===
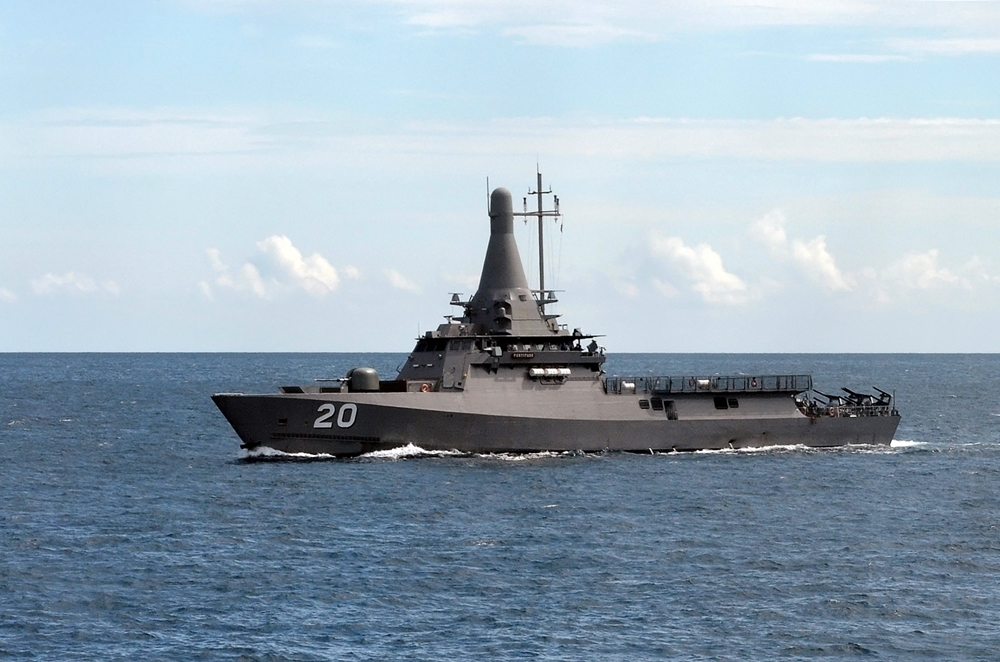
RSS Fortitude, a littoral mission vessel underway in the Singapore Strait in 2018

The Independence-class littoral mission vessel is a class of eight surface platforms succeeding the Fearless class. In January 2013, the Ministry of Defence awarded ST Engineering a contract to build and design eight vessels. A subsidiary of the company, ST Marine was charged with building the ships at Benoi Yard and integrating the combat systems supplied by the group's electronics arm, ST Electronics. The class was designed with the "lean manning" concept to facilitate a smaller crew complement to reflect the declining birthrate in Singapore, with increased levels of automation and remote monitoring systems. This has resulted in its combat information center, machinery control room, and bridge being co-located in a single location known as the integrated command center. Its modularity also allows the ship to deploy unmanned and mine-countermeasure systems or be reconfigured to support disaster-relief operations. The ships have been sent on overseas deployments. The last three ships of the class were commissioned in January 2020.

The littoral mission vessels were formerly under 182 Squadron until June 2020 with the inauguration of the Maritime Security Command. The eight Independence-class littoral mission vessels now form the Second Flotilla of the RSN.

=== Tank landing ships ===
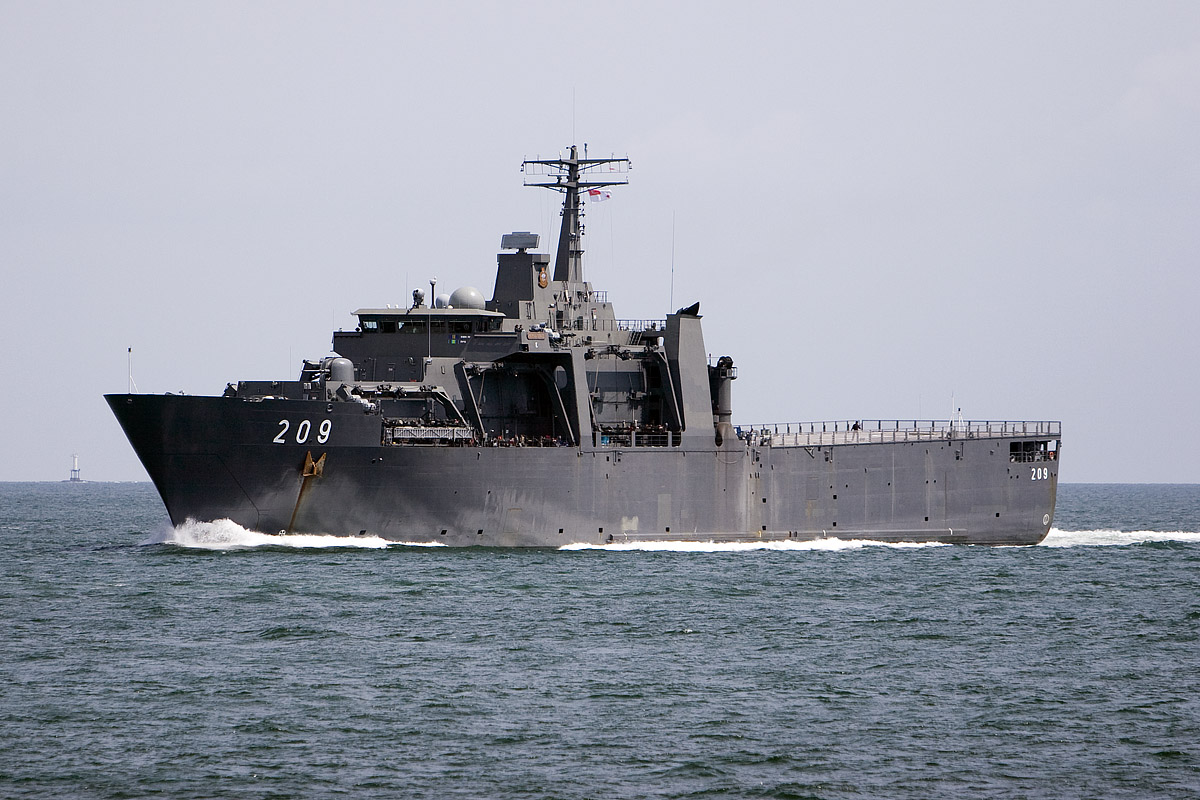
RSS Persistence, officially designated as a landing ship tank, underway in the Singapore Strait in 2007

The Endurance-class tank landing ships are the largest class of ships in the RSN. They were designed and built locally by ST Marine to replace the old County-class tank landing ships (LST). Each ship is fitted with a well dock that can accommodate four landing craft and a flight deck that can accommodate two medium lift helicopters. While the RSN describes the Endurance class as LSTs, they lack the beaching capability traditionally associated with LSTs, and their well docks and flight decks qualify the Endurance class more as amphibious transport docks.

The ships provide sea transportation for personnel and equipment for SAFs overseas training, as well as a training platform for RSN's midshipmen. RSS Endurance became the first RSN ship to circumnavigate the globe when it participated in the 2000 International Naval Review in New York City. The ships are also actively involved in humanitarian and disaster relief operations, notably in East Timor, the Persian Gulf, the tsunami-hit Indonesian province of Aceh and most recently, disappearance of Indonesia AirAsia Flight 8501. The four ships form the Third Flotilla of the RSN.

=== Mine countermeasures vessels ===
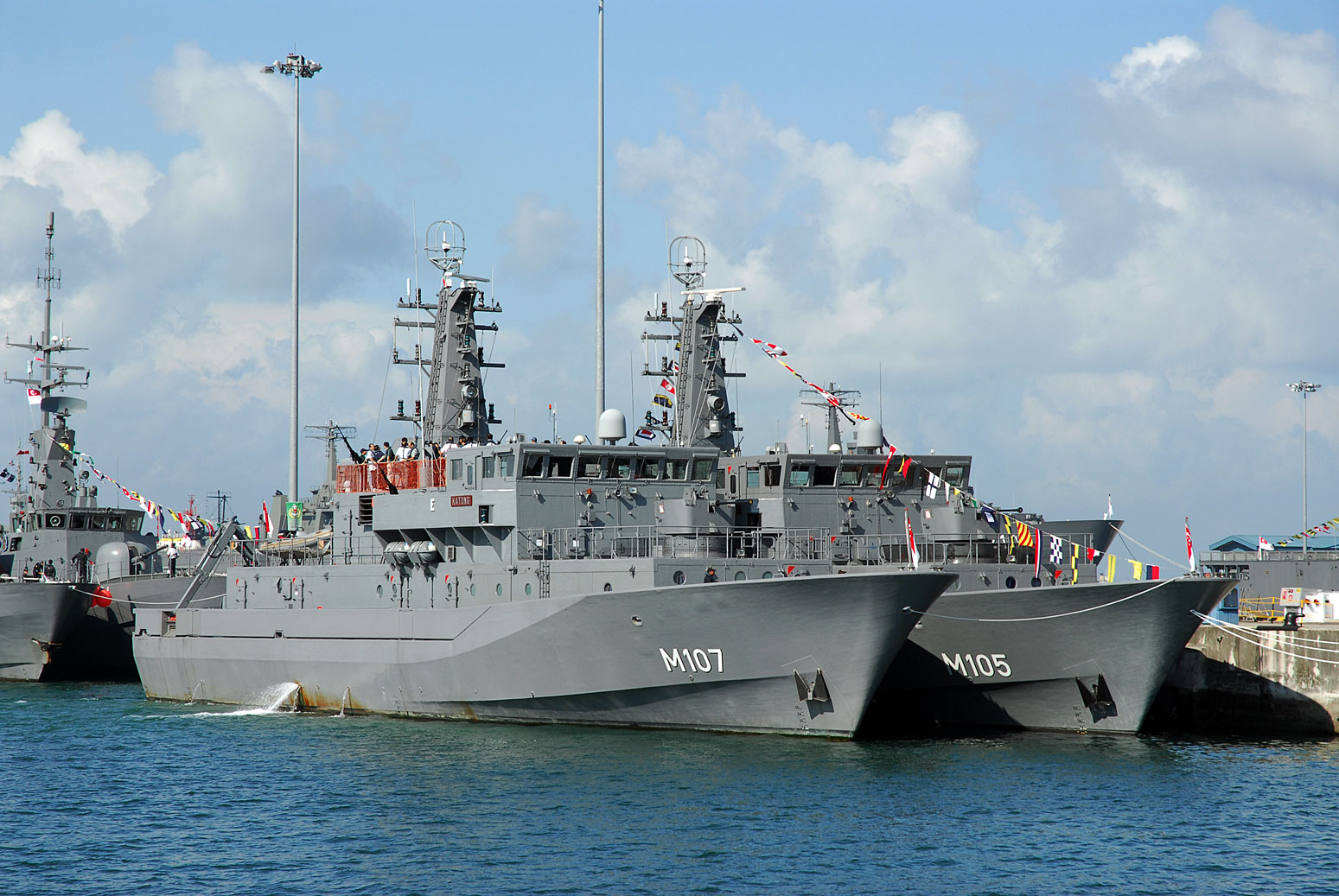
RSS Katong and RSS Bedok alongside Changi Naval Base during the Navy Open House 2007

The RSN acquired mine countermeasure capabilities as early as 1975, when the USN's USS Thrasher and USS Whippoorwill were reactivated by the RSN's engineers and technicians in California. The Bluebird-class coastal minesweepers were commissioned as RSS Jupiter and RSS Mercury.

These two ships were eventually replaced by the Bedok-class mine countermeasures vessels. The first ship, RSS Bedok, was built by Karlskronavarvet in Sweden based on the Landsort-class design. The remaining three ships were prefabricated in Sweden and transferred to Singapore for final assembly by ST Marine. The ships are constructed of glass reinforced plastic to maintain low magnetic and acoustic signatures, and are fitted with Voith Schneider Propellers, giving it the highest manoeuvrability in the navy.

The RSN also operates the Protector unmanned surface vehicles. They were deployed together with the Endurance-class landing ships tank to the North Persian Gulf for peacekeeping operations in 2005, where they performed surveillance and reconnaissance, as well as force protection duties for more than eight hours at a go.

Unmanned assets and the mine countermeasures ships form the Sixth Flotilla of the RSN.

=== Submarines ===
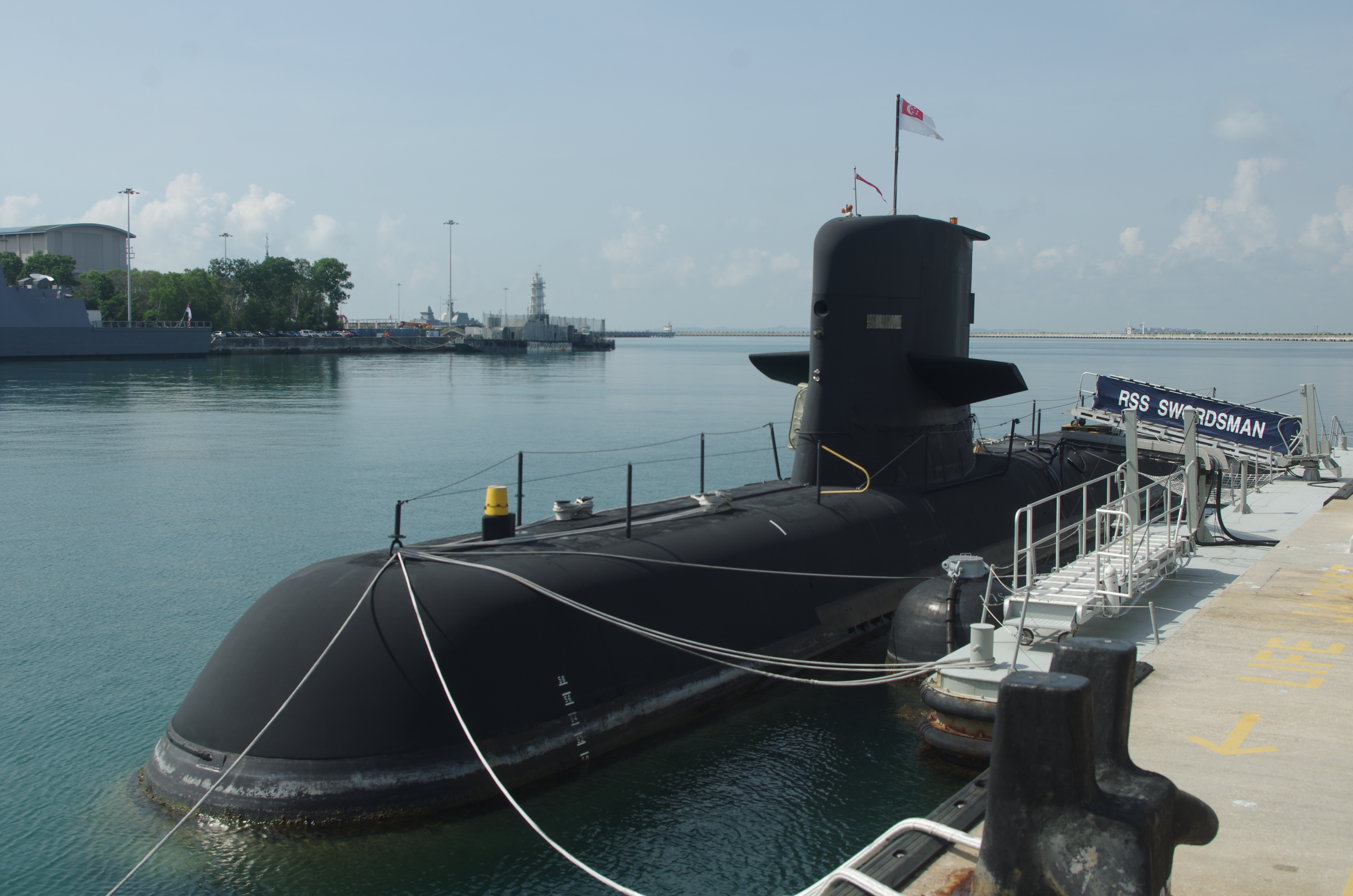
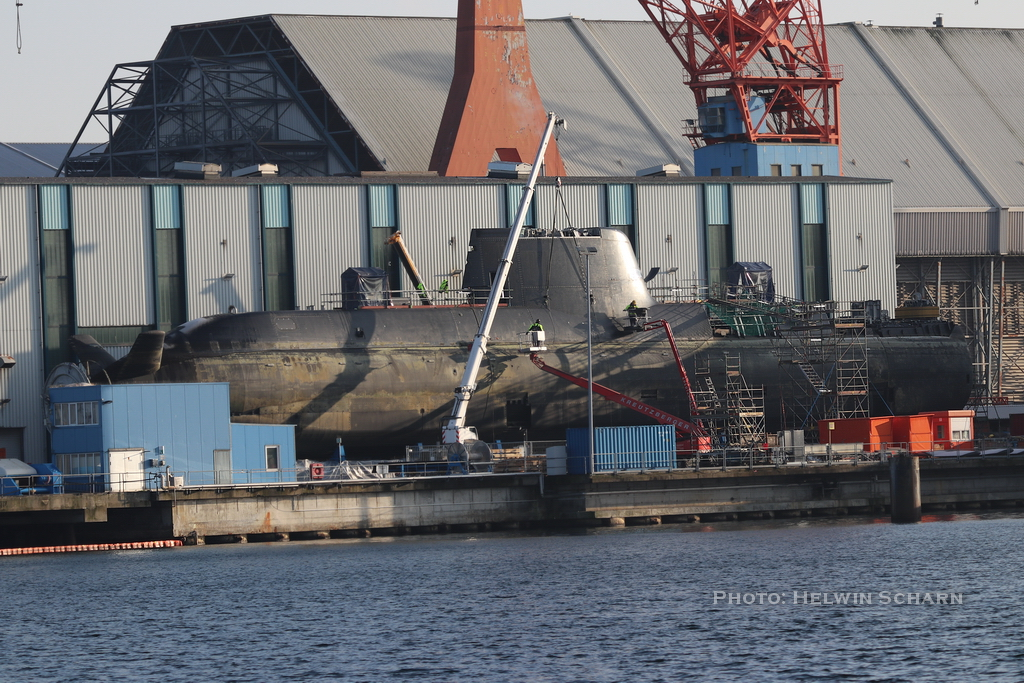
Top: RSS Swordsman alongside Changi Naval Base
Bottom: RSS Invincible in drydock at the TKMS yard in Germany

==== Archer class ====
The Archer-class submarines were also former Swedish Navy combatants and known as the Västergötland class. In November 2005, an agreement was signed with Kockums for the same tropicalisation modifications for two submarines. Amidst the refitting process, an air independent propulsion system was installed, which necessitated the cutting apart of the submarine's hull to fit new components. RSS Archer was relaunched on 16 June 2009 and recommissioned on 2 December 2011, with her sister boat RSS Swordsman being commissioned on 30 April 2013. The AIP modification enables the submarines to have longer submerged endurance and lower noise signature, enhancing its stealth capability. The advanced sonar system is capable of detecting contacts at a further distance, while the torpedo system has a better target acquisition capability, which allows the submarines to engage contacts at a further range.

An upgrade program was conducted between 2016 and early 2019, which involved the installation of CM010 optronic periscopes and new combat management, sonar and countermeasure systems.

==== Invincible class ====
The Invincible class, also known as Type 218SG, is a submarine class ordered from Germany's ThyssenKrupp Marine Systems. Two Invincible-class submarines were procured in November 2013 and another two in May 2017. Several German industry experts commented then that the project would cost about one billion Euros and take six years to complete, with the first submarine expected to be delivered in 2020.

The diesel electric submarines will have 50 per cent longer endurance, more firepower, more capable sensors and advanced automation than the existing fleet of RSN submarines. Armed with eight torpedo tubes and manned by a crew of 28, they can travel at a surface speed of more than 10 knots and a submerged speed of more than 15 knots. These submarines are particularly customised for Singapore's shallow and busy waters.

The first of four, RSS Invincible, was launched on 18 February 2019. She will undergo sea trials in Germany before delivery in 2022. The second and third boat, RSS Impeccable and RSS Illustrious were launched on 13 December 2022, expected to be delivered in 2023. The remaining one is scheduled to follow by 2024. The Invincible and Archer-class submarines are projected to replace the Challenger-class afterwards.

All submarines, regardless of class, form the Seventh Flotilla of the RSN. The RSN also operates the submarine support and rescue vessel MV Swift Rescue.

=== Corvettes ===
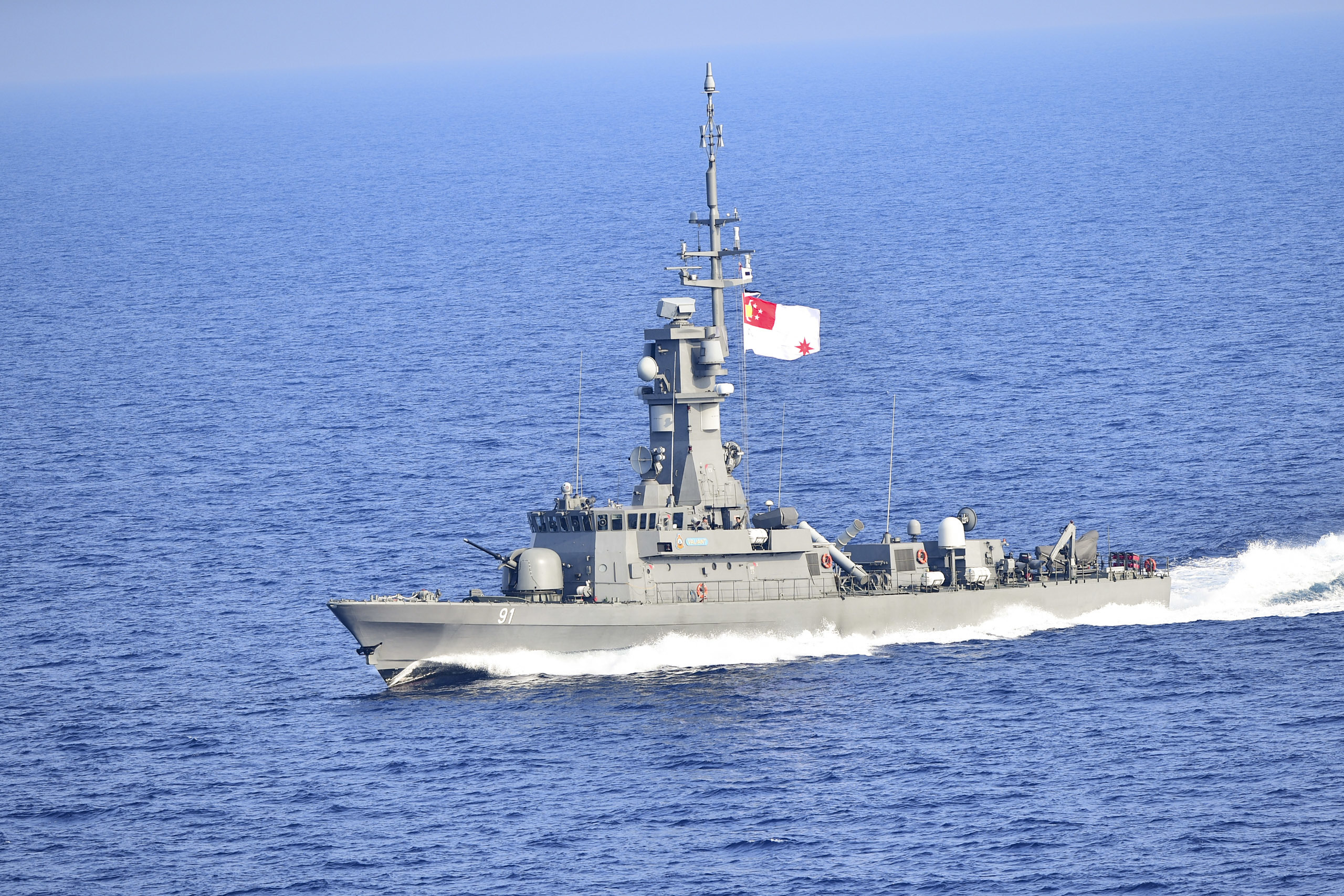
RSS Valiant underway in the South China Sea in 2018

In 1983, the RSN ordered six Victory-class corvettes from Friedrich Lürssen Werft of Germany, with the first being built in Germany and remaining five locally by ST Marine. The corvettes represented a strategic change in Singapore's defence posture as the Navy sought to redefine its purpose to be "more than a coastguard" and project power in the region for deterrence purposes; they were the first ships in the RSN to have an anti-submarine capability, and remain the fastest ships in the fleet with a speed in excess of 30 knots. A244-S torpedoes were reportedly acquired to counter the threat of an increased number of submarines passing through the Malacca Strait, with Soviet submarines having been tracked passing through entirely submerged. The first three ships were commissioned in August 1990 and the remaining three in May 1991.

The corvettes have been continuously upgraded to incorporate new technologies and better sea keeping capabilities. Two sets of 8-cell Barak I were installed in 1996 as part of a general refit. A life extension program between 2009 and 2013 redesigned the mast to incorporate new sensors, overhauled the combat management system, and added the ability for the ship to launch a single ScanEagle UAV for remote surveillance without the need to approach a target. The anti-submarine torpedoes and variable depth sonar detectors were removed during the refit. The six corvettes form the Eighth Flotilla of the RSN.

The Victory-class corvettes are projected to be replaced by six multi-role combat vessels by 2030, with the first ship to be delivered in 2025.

=== Maritime security and response vessels ===
The Sentinel-class maritime security and response vessels (MSRV) are four refurbished Fearless-class patrol vessels. The refurbishment plan was announced in March 2020 in response to the increase of sea robberies within the region, and foreign intrusions of Singapore territorial waters. As part of the refit, non-lethal LRAD and laser warning systems were added to increase operational flexibility, while fenders were incorporated into the hull to enable quicker alongside operations of suspicious vessels. The forward part of the bridge was also reinforced with ballistic-resistant armour.

The first two vessels MSRV Sentinel and MSRV Guardian entered operational service on 26 January 2021, with the latter two MSRV Protector and MSRV Bastion on 20 January 2022. Other than the MSRVs, the flotilla will also operate two Maritime Security Tugboats (MSRTs), and will operate new purpose-built vessels from 2026. The ships form the Maritime Security and Response Flotilla of the RSN.

== Historical fleet ==
=== Missile gunboats ===
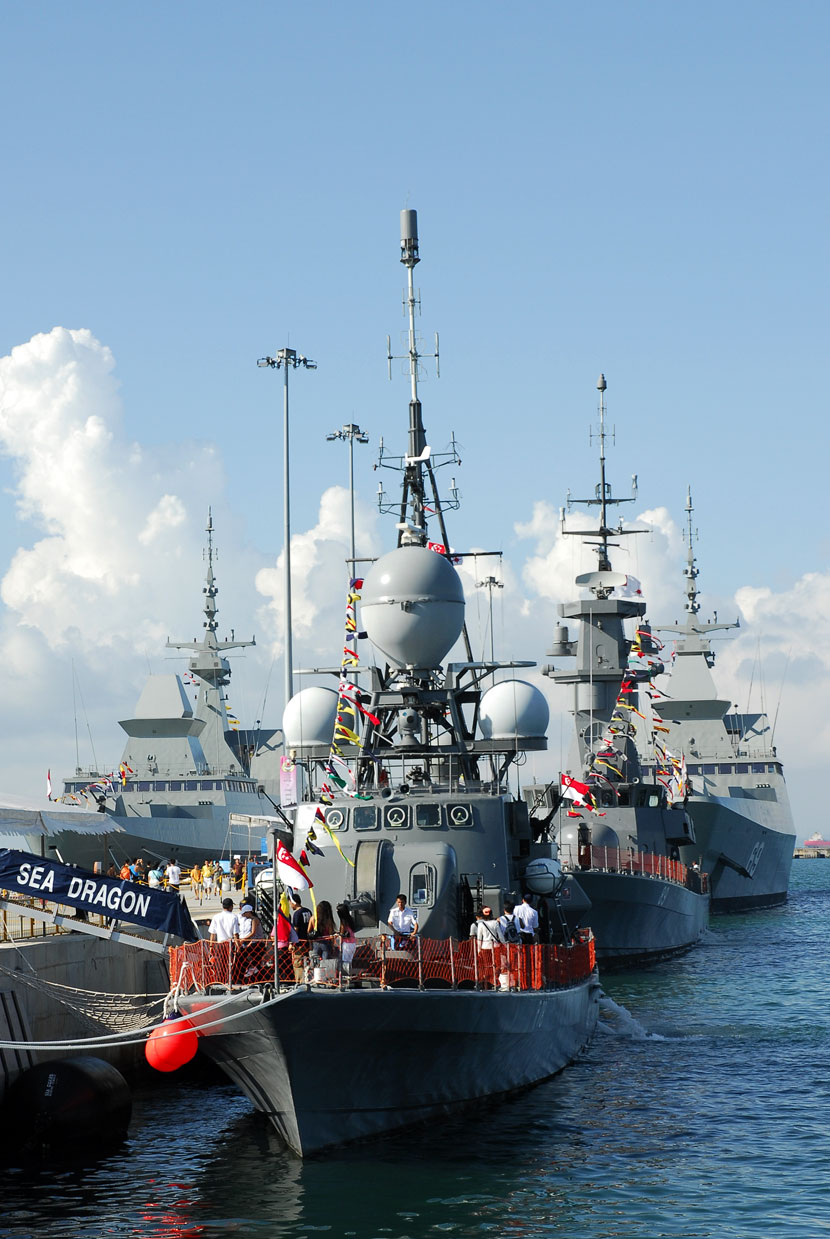
RSS Sea Dragon docked at Changi Naval Base during the Navy Open House 2007

The Sea Wolf-class missile gunboats were acquired in 1968 and based on the TNC 45 design from Fredrich Lürssen Werft. The first two gunboats—RSS Sea Wolf and RSS Sea Lion—were constructed in West Germany in 1972, while the remaining four - RSS Sea Dragon, RSS Sea Tiger, RSS Sea Hawk and RSS Sea Scorpion - were constructed locally by Singapore Shipbuilding and Engineering, with all six ships being commissioned by 1976. The gunboats were initially equipped with Israeli-manufactured anti-ship Gabriel missiles and Bofors guns. Sea Wolf fired the first missile by the RSN in March 1972.

As new technology became available, a number of upgrading programmes were initiated to increase their strike capability and sophistication. Between 1986 and 1988, they were upgraded to launch Boeing Harpoon (SSM) surface-to-surface missiles, and in 1994, the Bofors gun was replaced with Mistral surface-to-air (SAM) missiles. The continuous upgrades to the gunboats' armaments and sensors made them regarded as being at the forefront of naval warfare technology between the 1980s and 1990s.

The gunboats engaged in numerous exercises with foreign navies and visited many port of calls throughout their lifespan. On 13 May 2008, all six gunboats were retired at a sunset decommissioning ceremony held at Changi Naval Base following 33 years of service.

=== Patrol vessels ===
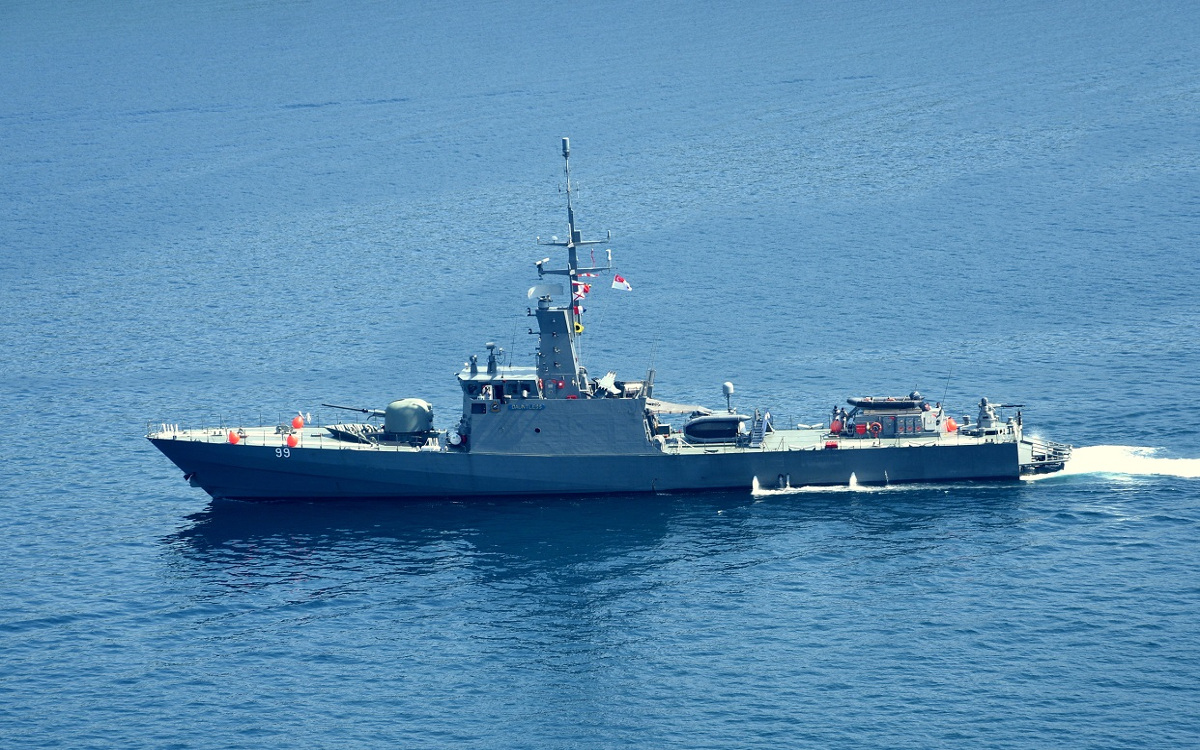
RSS Dauntless, during the bilateral exercise MILAN 2018 with the Indian Navy

Between the 1970s and 1990s, the RSN operated Independence-class and Swift-class coastal patrol crafts. They were gradually replaced by the Fearless-class patrol vessels built locally by ST Marine to replace the ageing coastal patrol craft, with all ships in commission by August 1989. The first six vessels of the Fearless class were armed for anti-submarine warfare missions and placed under the Fleet as 189 Squadron, with the remaining six being allocated to 182 Squadron under Coastal Command. RSS Courageous was badly damaged in a collision with a container ship in the Singapore Strait in January 2003 and removed from service.

189 Squadron was subsequently transferred to Coastal Command in January 2005, placing all eleven ships under the same formation; the anti-submarine suite was also gradually removed as the RSN refocused its ASW capability on other platforms. The eleven patrol vessels formed the combined 182/189 Squadron until May 2016 when the first Independence-class littoral mission vessel completed its sea trials; 189 Squadron was subsequently subsumed into 182 Squadron.

On 11 December 2020, the final two patrol vessels RSS Gallant and RSS Freedom were decommissioned. Four vessels of the class were converted into Sentinel-class maritime security and response vessels.

=== Submarines ===
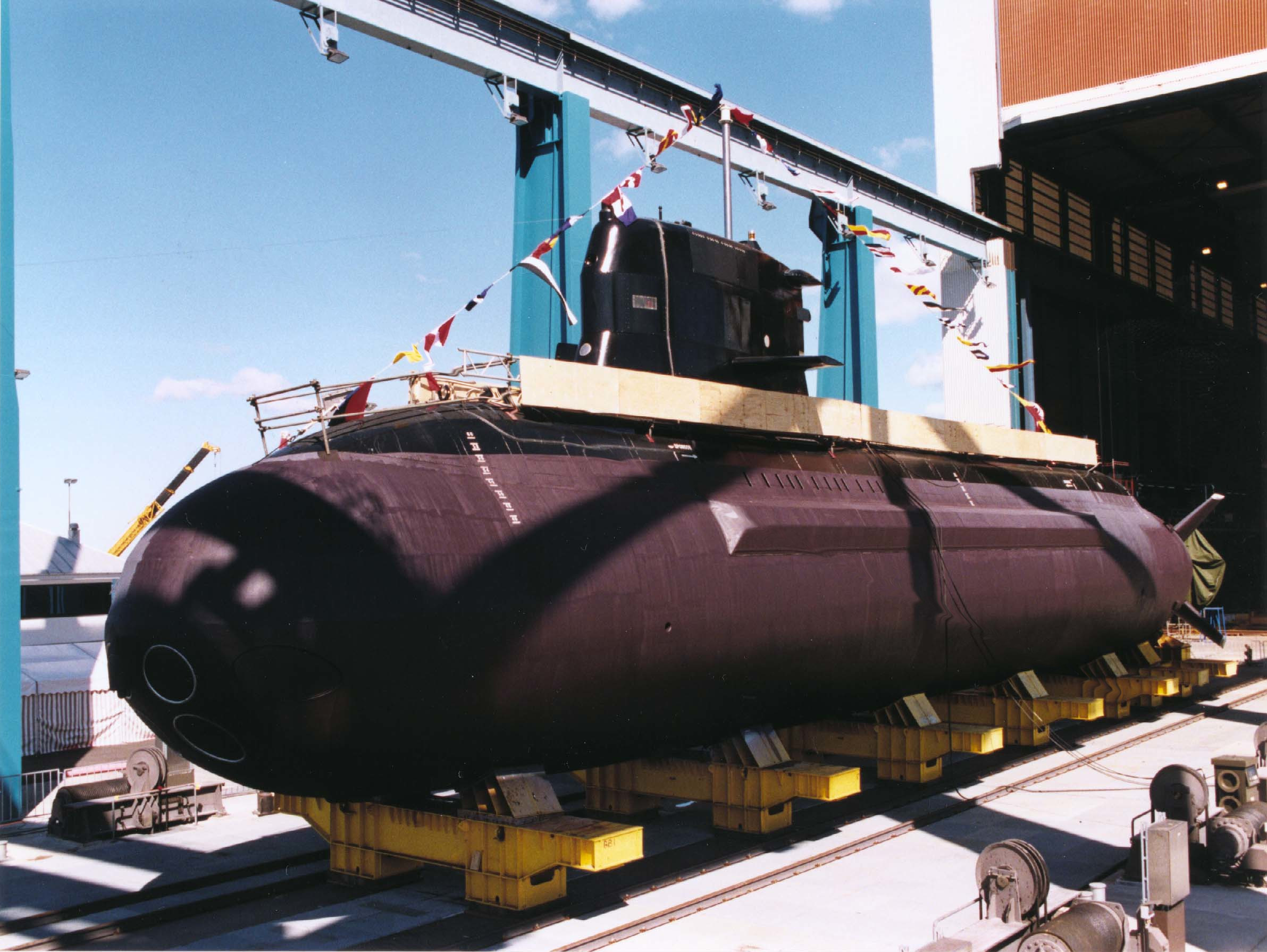
RSS Chieftain during her refurbishment in Sweden

In 1995, the RSN acquired a Sjöormen-class submarine from the Swedish Navy. Another three were transferred in 1997 and rechristened the Challenger class, making them Singapore's first underwater platforms. As the submarines were designed for operations in the Baltic Sea, various modifications were required to suit them to tropical waters. A comprehensive tropicalisation refitting programme was implemented for all four submarines, which involved the installation of air conditioning, marine growth protection systems and corrosion-resistant piping.

It was believed that the Challenger class were purchased to develop the required submarine operations expertise before selecting a modern class of submarines to replace them, since all the boats were then over 40 years old. RSS Challenger and RSS Centurion were retired from service in 2015. The remaining two Challenger class, RSS Conqueror and RSS Chieftain were decommissioned on 25 November 2024.

== Bases ==
Past and present naval bases

=== Tuas Naval Base ===
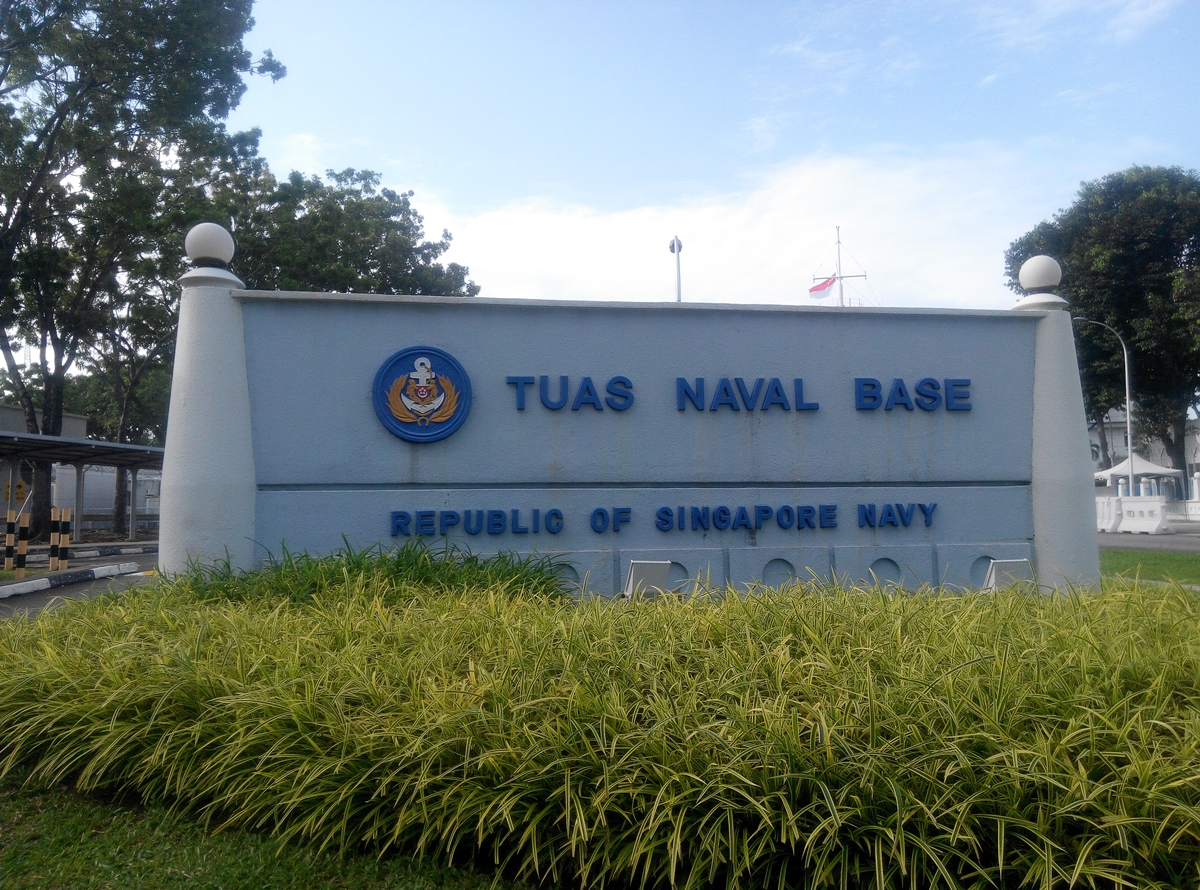
Entrance to Tuas Naval Base

Tuas Naval Base (TNB) is located at the western tip of Singapore and occupies 0.28 km^{2} (0.11 mi^{2}) of land. It was officially opened on 2 September 1994 by Prime Minister Goh Chok Tong. For about two decades, Brani Naval Base was the RSN's only base. An expansion of the fleet in the early 1980s meant that more space was needed for the fleet and its shore infrastructure. However, this was not possible as the land around Brani was reserved for use by the port authority to develop container facilities. As a result, Tuas was selected as the site for a new naval base.

Better utilisation of space at TNB resulted in two and a half times more berthing space than Brani, even though TNB only has a shoreline of 850 m (0.5 mi). Provision was also made for recreational facilities. Automation was incorporated into the design of TNB to reduce manpower requirements, such as mechanical ramps for the loading and unloading of vehicles and an automatic storage and retrieval system. It also has a floating dock which can lift 600 tonnes and transfer a ship from sea to land to facilitate repairs and maintenance.

The base has since been enclosed to the west by land reclamation in Tuas South. The missile corvettes, patrol vessels, littoral mission vessels and mine counter-measures vessels are based at TNB.

=== RSS Singapura Changi Naval Base ===
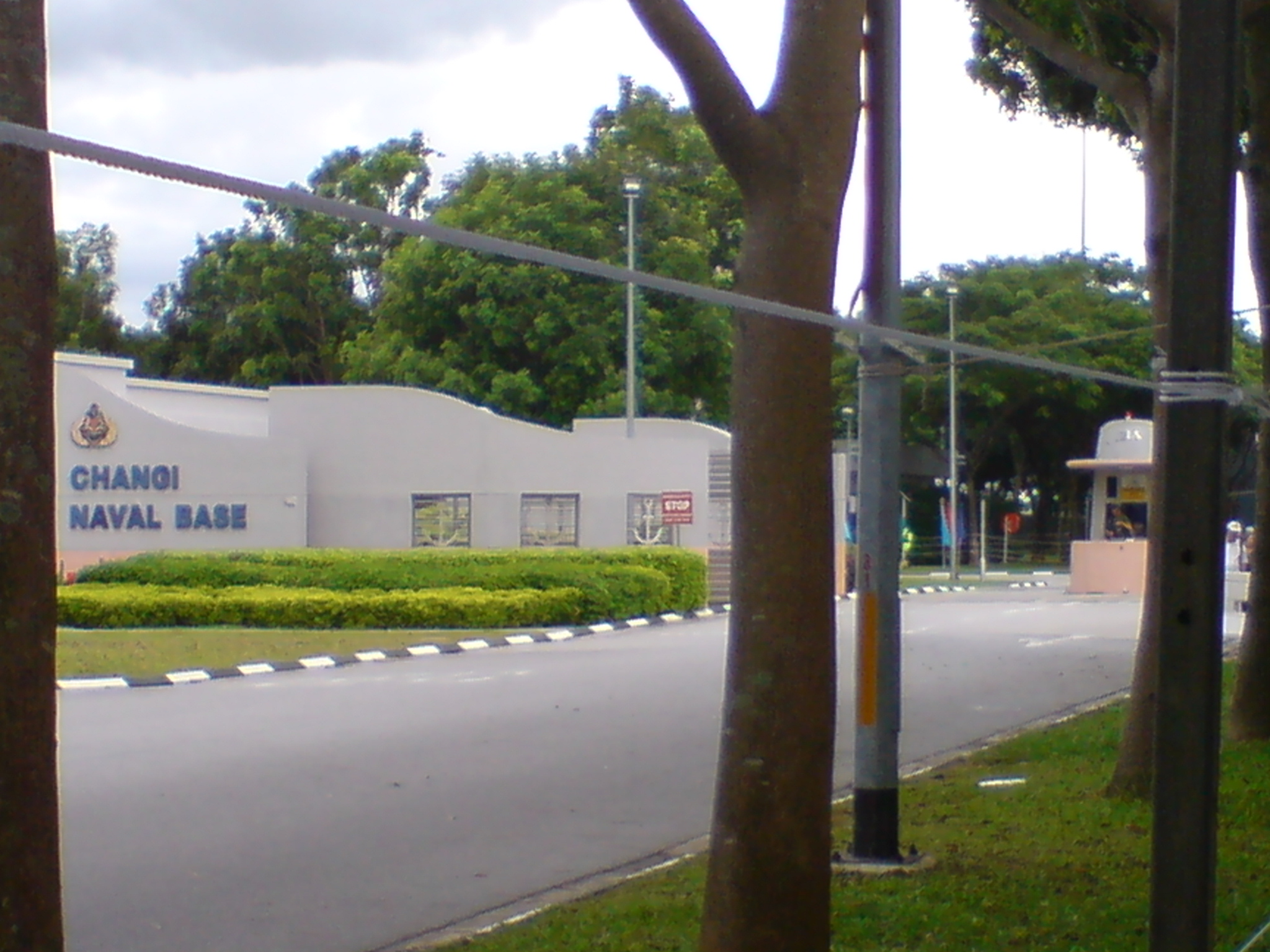
Entrance to Changi Naval Base

Changi Naval Base (CNB) is the latest naval facility of the RSN and was built to replace Brani Naval Base. Located on 1.28 km^{2} (0.50 mi^{2}) of reclaimed land at the eastern tip of Singapore, it was officially opened on 21 May 2004 by Prime Minister Goh Chok Tong. Its 6.2 km (3.9 mi) berthing space can accommodate an aircraft carrier and is often used by visiting ships of the USN.

Automation was incorporated into the design of CNB to reduce manpower requirements. It has an automated underground ammunition depot that allows ammunition to be loaded onto the ships and an automated warehouse system to store items. The base has a fibre optic broadband network for information management. The base was also designed to be environment-friendly, with small-scale wind turbines powering the lights along the breakwaters at night. Conventional roof construction materials were substituted by thin film solar panels and the solar energy generated lights the base. In addition, seawater is used in the air-conditioning system.

The submarines, frigates and landing ships tank are based at CNB. Co-located in CNB is the Naval Military Experts Institute, also known as RSS Panglima— named in honour of the first ship of the navy.
