= Independence-class patrol craft =

Patrol vessels of the Republic of Singapore Navy

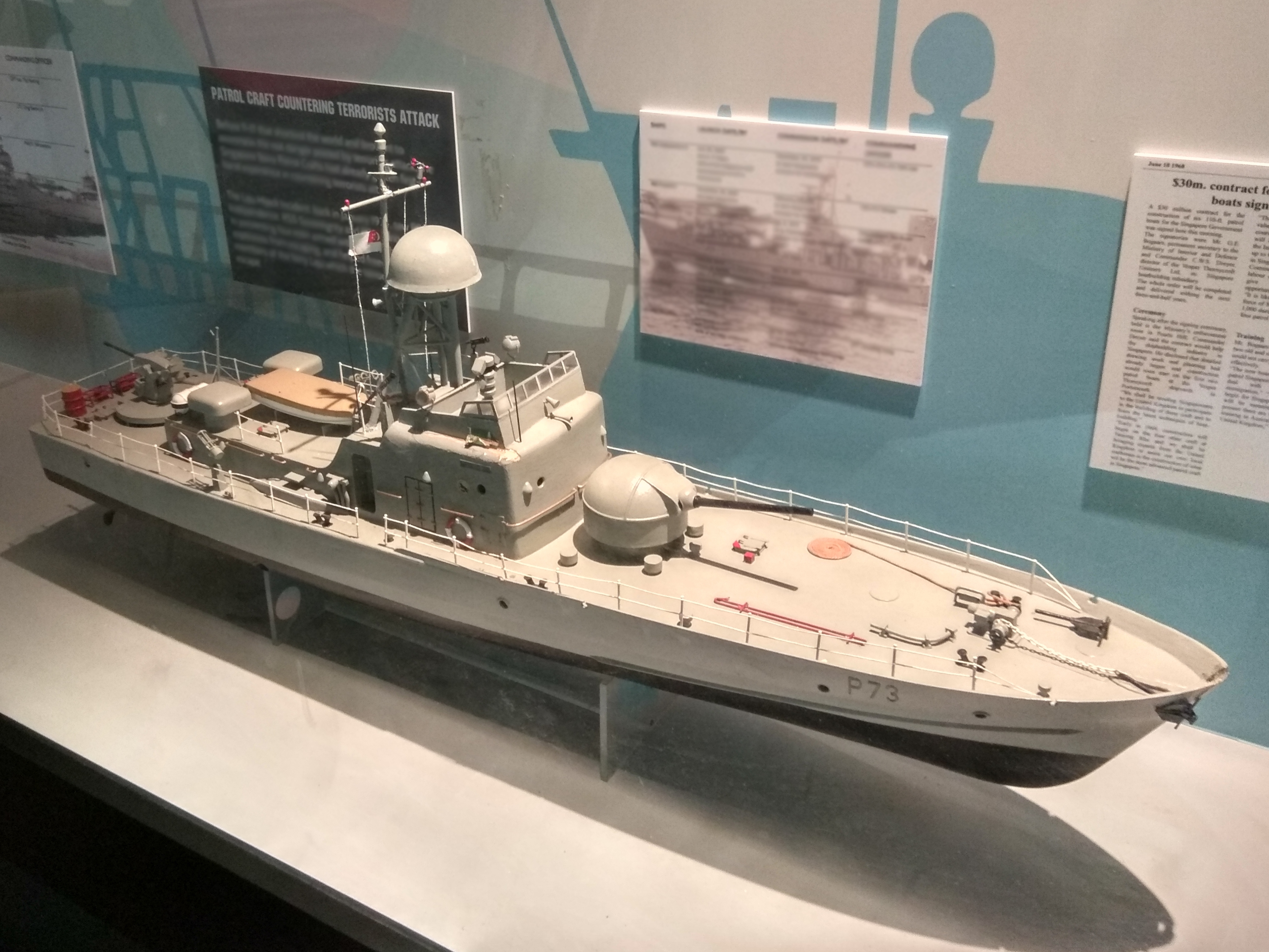
Model of an Independence-class type-B patrol craft

The Independence-class patrol craft was a series of gun-armed patrol vessels built by Vosper Thornycroft in the 1970s for the Republic of Singapore Navy.

== History ==
Due to the independence of Singapore in 1965, there was a need to organize and expand maritime patrol and monitoring capabilities for the fledgling country. A SGD $30 million contract was signed in June 1968 with Vosper Thornycroft by then-Permanent Secretary of the Defence and Interior Ministry, George Edwin Bogaars, for six gun-armed patrol craft for the Maritime Command (MC), which was the predecessor of the current Republic of Singapore Navy.

The first vessel was built by Vosper in Portchester, Portsmouth, United Kingdom while the remainder were constructed at the Vosper Thorneycroft Uniteers (VTU) Singapore yard in Tanjong Rhu. All patrol craft were commissioned by January 1972 and were decommissioned by the early 1990s.

== Design ==
These patrol craft were based on Vosper's 110 ft design and came in two classes.

The "A class" were fitted with a 40 mm Bofors gun forward and a 20 mm Oerlikon gun aft, both capable of engaging air and surface targets.

The "B class" were fitted with a 76.2 mm Bofors gun forward, which had a surface and shore bombardment capability, and a 20 mm Oerlikon gun at the aft.

== Ships of class ==
Name	Pennant number	Launched	Commissioned	Decommissioned
RSS Independence	P 69		8 July 1970	--
RSS Freedom	P 70	18 Nov 1969	14 Feb 1971	--
RSS Justice	P 71		21 Apr 1971	--
RSS Sovereignty	P 72		3 July 1971	--
RSS Daring	P 73		30 Jan 1972	--
RSS Dauntless	P 74		30 Jan 1972	--
