= Brani Naval Base =

Headquarters of part of Singapore Police Force

Coordinates: 1°15′24.19″N 103°49′58.97″E

Brani Regional Base (formerly Brani Naval Base) is the headquarters of the Police Coast Guard (PCG) of the Singapore Police Force (SPF). It was formerly a naval base of the Republic of Singapore Navy (RSN), the premises of which has since been relocated to Changi Naval Base and Tuas Naval Base.

== History ==
Pulau Brani was selected to house the naval base in the early 1970s and work started on 17 August 1972, with Brigadier Sir Bruce White as the consultant. The entire project cost S$35 million and was completed in January 1974. On 26 January 1974, Prime Minister Lee Kuan Yew opened the Singapore Maritime Command Naval Base. The naval base had a new wharf and a supply base complex added in 1983 at the cost of S$16 million.

Part of the base was subsequently redeveloped to accommodate the expansion of the adjacent port, and some of the facilities were relocated to the new Tuas Naval Base in 1995. On 12 October 2000, the remainder of the Navy's facilities were finally closed. On 23 March 2004, the Immigration and Checkpoints Authority's Coastal Command Headquarters was formally opened by Minister for Home Affairs Wong Kan Seng.

The Police Coast Guard has since rebuilt its new headquarters at the old premises of the Navy, and the newly-built Police Coast Guard headquarters on Pulau Brani begun operations on 20 March 2006 following the closure of its existing facilities in Kallang Basin.

The Police Coast Guard's Brani Regional Base was formally opened by Minister for Home Affairs Wong Kan Seng on 8 February 2007.

BRANI NAVAL BASE, SG
