= RSS Persistence (209) =

Endurance-class landing ships of the Republic of Singapore Navy

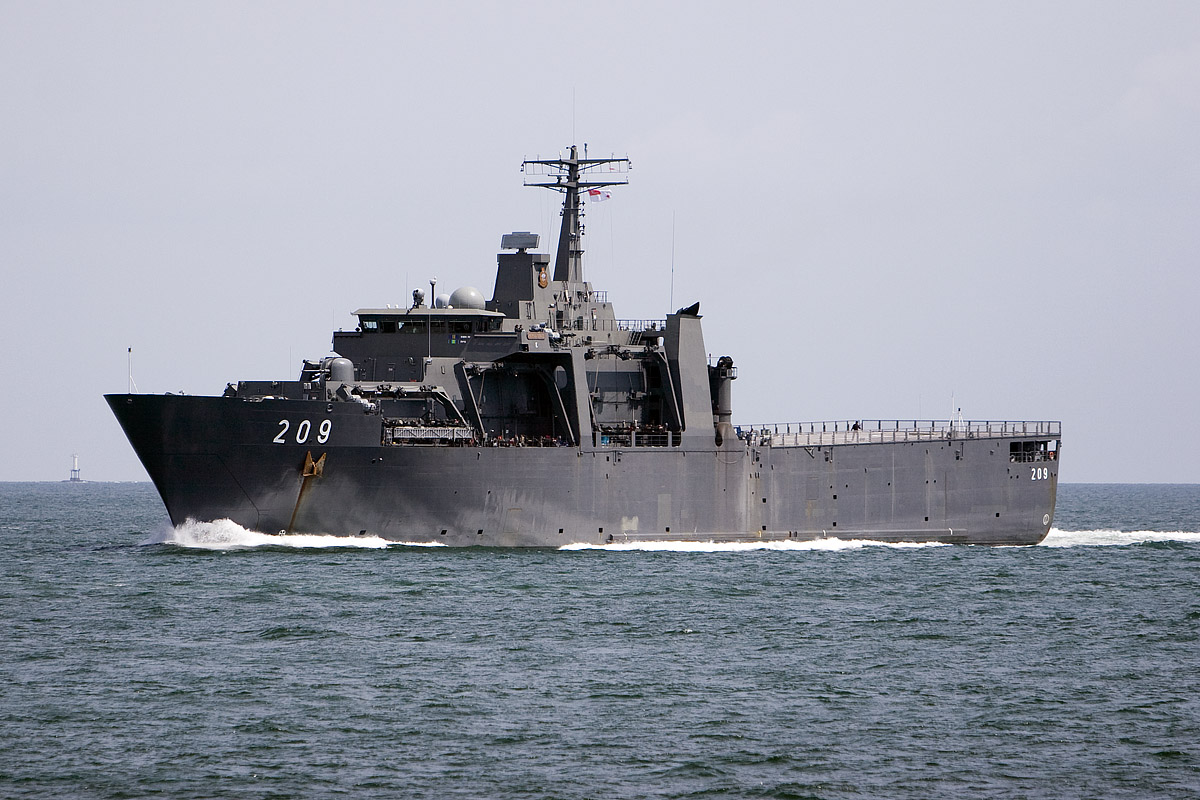
- RSS Persistence passes through the Singapore Strait on 26 June 2007.

History

Singapore
- Name: Persistence
- Namesake: Persistence
- Builder: ST Engineering
- Laid down: 1998
- Launched: 18 March 1999
- Commissioned: 7 April 2001
- Home port: Changi
- Identification: MMSI number: 563437000; Callsign: 9VTY; Pennant number: 209
- Status: Active

General characteristics
- Class & type: Endurance-class landing platform dock
- Displacement: Standard: 6,500 t (6,400 long tons; 7,200 short tons); Full load: 8,500 t (8,400 long tons; 9,400 short tons)
- Length: 141.0 m (462 ft 7 in)
- Beam: 21.0 m (68 ft 11 in)
- Draught: 5.0 m (16 ft 5 in)
- Ramps: 2 × (bow and stern)
- Installed power: 4 × Ruston 6RK215 diesel generators, each producing 875 kW (1,173 hp); Total output: 3,500 kW (4,690 shp)
- Propulsion: Combined diesel and diesel (CODAD) arrangement; 2 × Ruston 16RK 270 diesels, each producing 5,500 kW (7,400 hp), coupled to two Kamewa controllable-pitch propellers; Total output: 11,000 kW (14,800 shp)
- Speed: In excess of 15 kn (28 km/h; 17 mph)
- Range: 5,000 nmi (9,300 km; 5,800 mi) at 15 kn (28 km/h; 17 mph)
- Boats & landing craft carried: 4 × 13 m (43 ft) Fast Craft Equipment & Utility (FCEU) on davits; 2 × 25 m (82 ft) Fast Craft Utility (FCU) inside well deck
- Capacity: 18 tanks, 20 vehicles and bulk cargo
- Troops: > 350–500
- Crew: 65 (8 officers and 57 men)
- Sensors & processing systems: Search radar: IAI/ELTA EL/M-2238; Navigation radar: Kelvin Hughes Type 1007 (I band); Weapon control: CS Defense NAJIR 2000 electro-optronic director
- Electronic warfare & decoys: ESM/ECM: RAFAEL RAN 1101; Decoys: 2 × GEC Marconi Marine Shield III 102 mm sextuple fixed chaff/decoy launcher
- Armament: Anti-air: Mistral missiles launched from 2 × Simbad twin launcher mounts; Main gun: 1 × Oto Melara 76 mm super rapid gun; Autocannons: 2 × 25mm M242 Bushmaster Mk 38 Mod 2 (with stabilised Typhoon weapon sighting system, mounted amidships on port and starboard side); Machine guns: 4 × STK 50MG 12.7 mm (0.50 in) HMGs
- Aircraft carried: AS 332M Super Puma or AS532UL/AL Cougar or CH-47SD Chinook helicopters
- Aviation facilities: Flight deck and enclosed hangar for up to 2 medium-lift helicopters

Persistence (209) is the third ship of the Endurance-class landing platform dock of the Republic of Singapore Navy.

== Development ==
The navy's intention to purchase the Endurance-class was revealed by former Defence Minister Dr. Tony Tan during his visit to Tuas Naval Base on 3 August 1996. These ships were to replace the five ex-United States Navy (USN) County-class LSTs, which were acquired by Singapore from the United States in the 1970s. ST Marine was awarded the government contract to design and build the four ships – a significant milestone for the local defence and shipbuilding industries given the scale and extensiveness of the programme.

== Construction and career ==
She was laid down in 1998 and launched on 18 March 1999. She was commissioned on 7 April 2001 with the hull number 209.

RSS Persistence on 4 January 2005 joined RSS Endurance to Aceh in Indonesia to deliver emergency supplies and medical personnel to aid in the relief efforts after a tsunami. Persistence also featured later in support of the efforts finding Indonesia AirAsia Flight 8501.

On 12 February 2009, Minister of Defence Teo Chee Hean announced that Persistence would join other naval forces off the coast of Somalia for three months in 2009. Comprising an LST with two Super Puma helicopters on board, the Singapore Armed Forces Task Group has been conducting daily helicopter surveillance flights and sector patrols to deter and disrupt piracy activities. The ship worked with the multinational Combined Task Force 151 to protect shipping in the Gulf of Aden.

=== CARAT 2010 ===
RSS Vigilance, RSS Steadfast, RSS Persistence, MV Avatar, USNS Amelia Earhart, USS Russell, USS Chung-Hoon and USCGC Mellon participated in CARAT 2010.

=== Indonesia AirAsia Flight 8501 ===
In December 2014, Persistence was deployed in the search for Airasia Flight QZ8501 after it crashed into the Java Sea on 28 December 2014; along with the RSN ships Supreme, Valour, and Kallang, MV Swift Rescue, and two Lockheed C-130H Hercules.

== Gallery ==
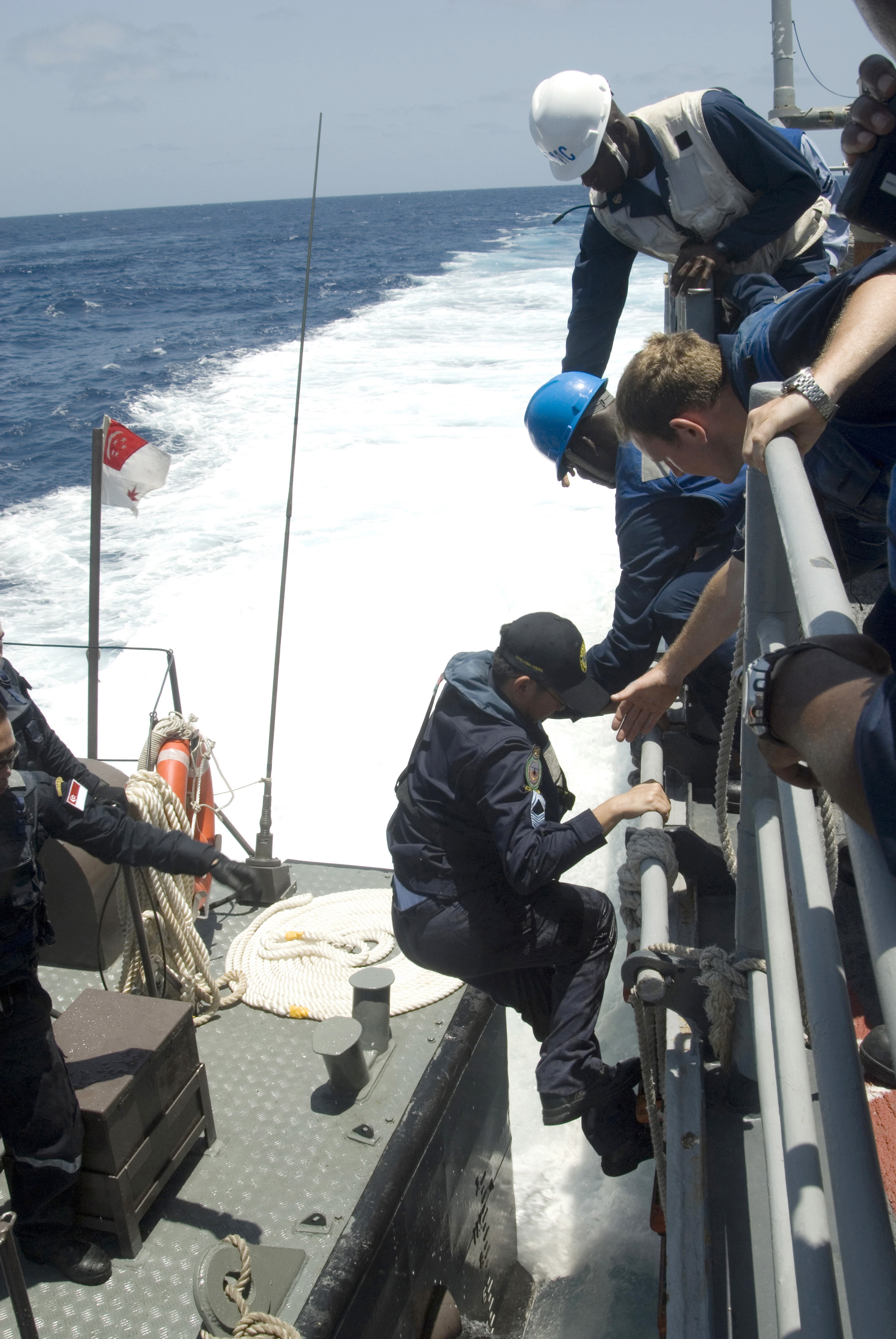
Sailors of USS Gettysburg assist crew members of RSS Persistence in the Gulf of Aden on 17 May 2009.
