= HTMS Angthong =

Royal Thai Navy landing ship

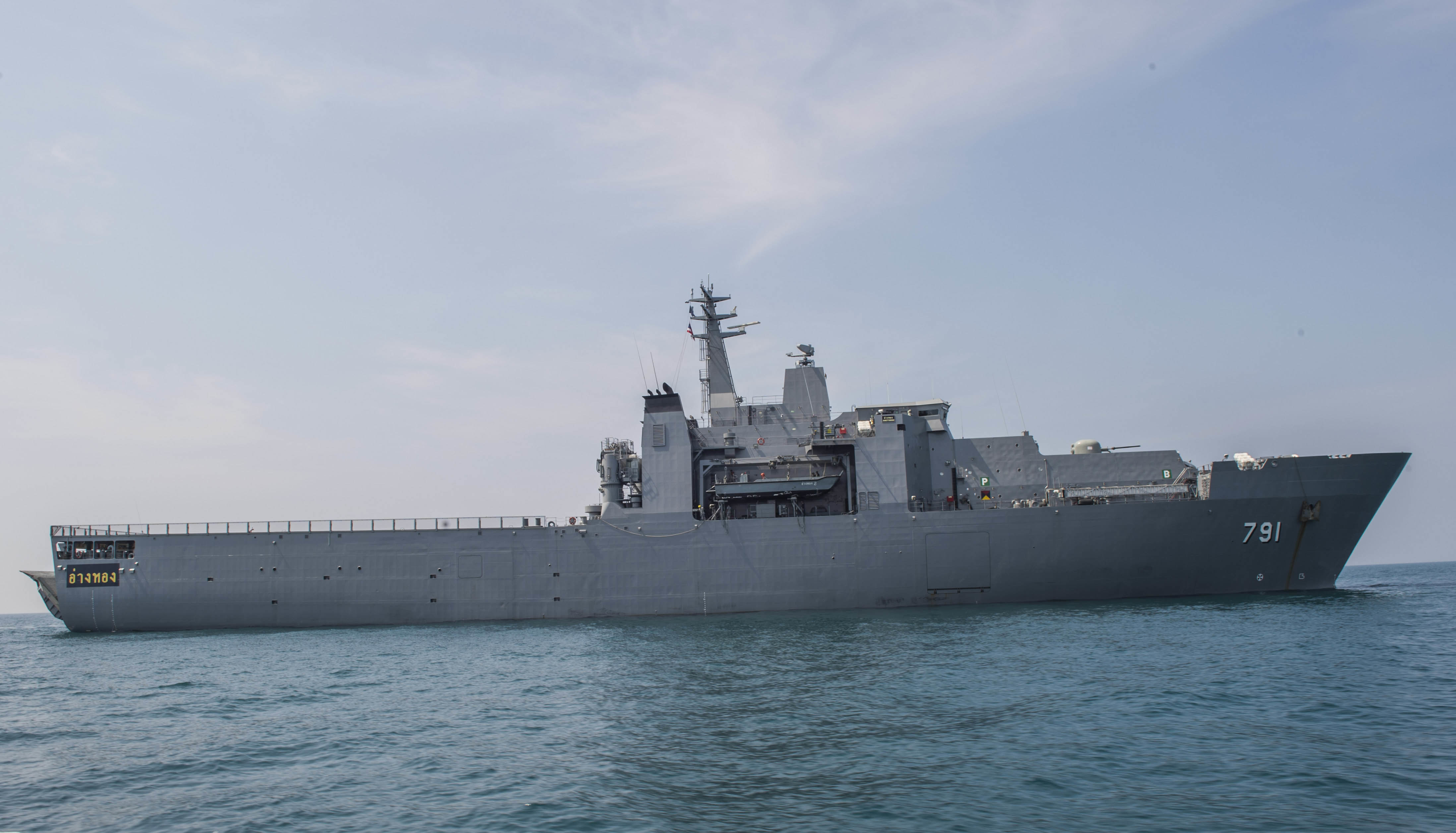
- HTMS Angthong underway on 12 February 2016

History

Thailand
- Name: Angthong
- Namesake: Ang Thong Islands
- Ordered: 11 November 2008
- Builder: ST Engineering
- Laid down: 2009
- Launched: 21 March 2011
- Commissioned: 19 April 2012
- Home port: Chonburi
- Identification: MMSI number: 567442000; Callsign: HSNJ; Pennant number: LPD-791
- Status: Active

General characteristics
- Class & type: Endurance-class landing platform dock
- Displacement: Standard: 6,500 t (6,400 long tons; 7,200 short tons); Full load: 8,500 t (8,400 long tons; 9,400 short tons)
- Length: 141.0 m (462 ft 7 in)
- Beam: 21.0 m (68 ft 11 in)
- Draught: 5.0 m (16 ft 5 in)
- Ramps: 2 × (bow and stern)
- Installed power: 4 × Ruston 6RK215 diesel generators, each producing 875 kW (1,173 hp); Total output: 3,500 kW (4,690 shp)
- Propulsion: Combined diesel and diesel (CODAD) arrangement; 2 × Ruston 16RK 270 diesels, each producing 5,500 kW (7,400 hp), coupled to two Kamewa controllable-pitch propellers; Total output: 11,000 kW (14,800 shp)
- Speed: In excess of 15 kn (28 km/h; 17 mph)
- Range: 5,000 nmi (9,300 km; 5,800 mi) at 15 kn (28 km/h; 17 mph)
- Boats & landing craft carried: 4 × 13 m (43 ft) Fast Craft Equipment & Utility (FCEU) on davits; 2 × 25 m (82 ft) Fast Craft Utility (FCU) inside well deck
- Capacity: 18 tanks, 20 vehicles and bulk cargo
- Troops: > 350–500
- Crew: 65 (8 officers and 57 men)
- Sensors & processing systems: Search radar: IAI/ELTA EL/M-2238; Navigation radar: Kelvin Hughes Type 1007 (I band); Weapon control: CS Defense NAJIR 2000 electro-optronic director
- Electronic warfare & decoys: ESM/ECM: RAFAEL RAN 1101; Decoys: 2 × GEC Marconi Marine Shield III 102 mm sextuple fixed chaff/decoy launcher
- Armament: Anti-air: Mistral missiles launched from 2 × Simbad twin launcher mounts; Main gun: 1 × Oto Melara 76 mm super rapid gun; Autocannons: 2 × 25mm M242 Bushmaster Mk 38 Mod 2 (with stabilised Typhoon weapon sighting system, mounted amidships on port and starboard side); Machine guns: 4 × STK 50MG 12.7 mm (0.50 in) HMGs
- Aircraft carried: AS 332M Super Puma or AS532UL/AL Cougar or CH-47SD Chinook helicopters
- Aviation facilities: Flight deck and enclosed hangar for up to 2 medium-lift helicopters

HTMS Angthong (LPD-791) (Thai: เรือหลวงอ่างทอง) is a Royal Thai Navy amphibious ship based on the design of Endurance-class landing platform dock of the Republic of Singapore Navy.

== Construction and career ==
Angthong was commissioned as part of the Thai navy's procurement of landing platform docks to expand its humanitarian assistance and disaster relief capacity following the 2004 Indian Ocean tsunami. On 11 November 2008, a SGD 200 million contract was signed between ST Marine and Thailand for the sale of one unit of the Endurance-class LPD and its associated landing craft. The LPD would use the Terma C-Series system, which includes the C-Flex combat management system, C-Search radar suite which includes the Scanter 4100 radar and IFF, and the C-Fire fire control system.

On 21 March 2011, the new ship was christened HTMS Angthong (pennant number LPD-791) and was launched from ST Marine's dockyard by the wife of Admiral Khamthorn Pumhiran, Commander-In-Chief of Royal Thai Navy (RTN). The delivery of the ship was completed on 19 April 2012.

The Angthong was deployed as a base of operations for the navy's humanitarian assistance mission during the 2015 Rohingya refugee crisis, and to provide disaster relief during flooding in Southern Thailand in January 2017.
