= Endurance-class landing platform dock =

Type of ship

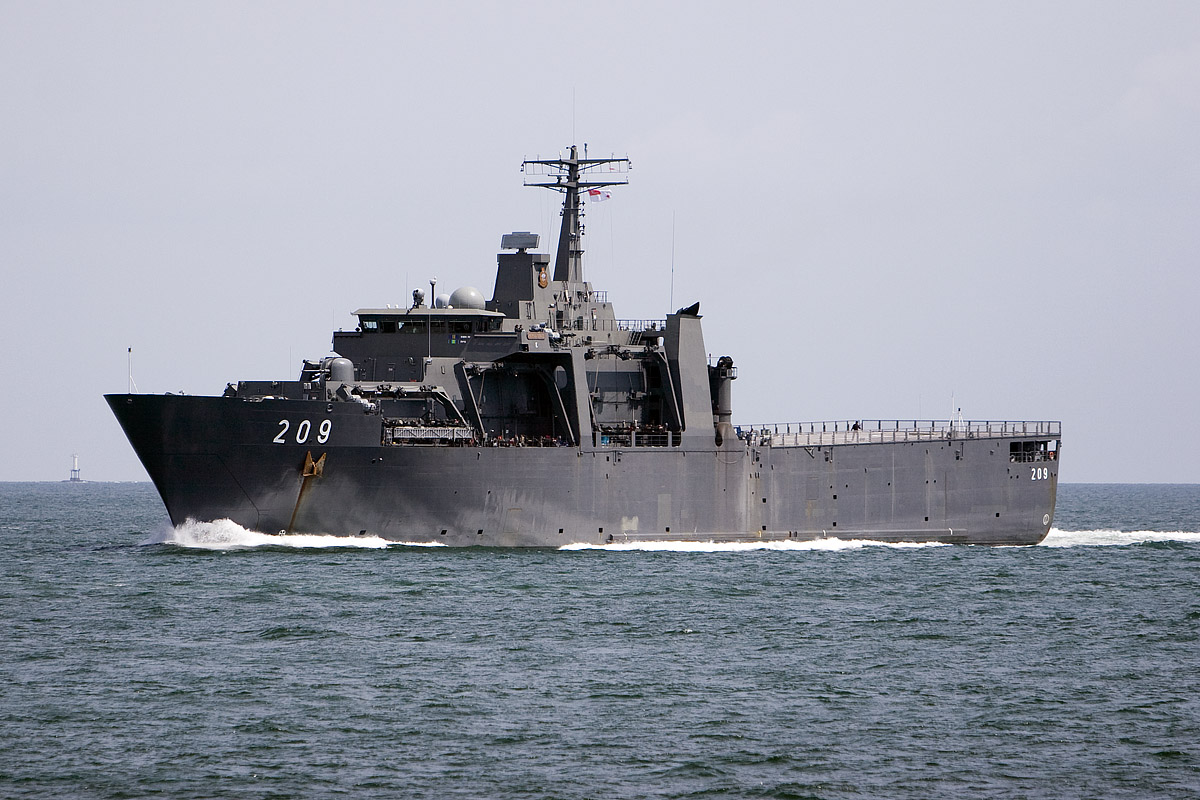
- RSS Persistence in the Singapore Strait.

Class overview
- Name: Endurance
- Builders: ST Engineering (Marine)
- Operators: Republic of Singapore Navy; Royal Thai Navy
- Preceded by: County class
- Completed: 5
- Active: 5

General characteristics
- Type: Landing platform dock
- Displacement: Standard: 6,500 t (6,400 long tons; 7,200 short tons); Full load: 8,500 t (8,400 long tons; 9,400 short tons)
- Length: 141.0 m (462 ft 7 in)
- Beam: 21.0 m (68 ft 11 in)
- Draught: 5.0 m (16 ft 5 in)
- Ramps: 2 × (bow and stern)
- Installed power: 4 × Ruston 6RK215 diesel generators, each producing 875 kW (1,173 hp); Total output: 3,500 kW (4,690 shp)
- Propulsion: Combined diesel and diesel (CODAD) arrangement; 2 × Ruston 16RK 270 diesels, each producing 5,500 kW (7,400 hp), coupled to two Kamewa controllable-pitch propellers; Total output: 11,000 kW (14,800 shp)
- Speed: In excess of 15 kn (28 km/h; 17 mph)
- Range: 5,000 nmi (9,300 km; 5,800 mi) at 15 kn (28 km/h; 17 mph)
- Boats & landing craft carried: 4 × 13 m (43 ft) Fast Craft Equipment & Utility (FCEU) on davits; 2 × 25 m (82 ft) Fast Craft Utility (FCU) inside well deck
- Capacity: 18 tanks, 20 vehicles and bulk cargo
- Troops: > 350–500
- Crew: 65 (8 officers and 57 men)
- Sensors & processing systems: Search radar: IAI/ELTA EL/M-2238; Navigation radar: Kelvin Hughes Type 1007 (I band); Weapon control: CS Defense NAJIR 2000 electro-optronic director
- Electronic warfare & decoys: ESM/ECM: RAFAEL RAN 1101; Decoys: 2 × GEC Marconi Marine Shield III 102 mm sextuple fixed chaff/decoy launcher
- Armament: Anti-air: Mistral missiles launched from 2 × Simbad twin launcher mounts; Main gun: 1 × Oto Melara 76 mm super rapid gun; Autocannons: 2 × 25mm M242 Bushmaster Mk 38 Mod 2 (with stabilised Typhoon weapon sighting system, mounted amidships on port and starboard side); Machine guns: 4 × STK 50MG 12.7 mm (0.50 in) HMGs
- Aircraft carried: AS 332M Super Puma or AS532UL/AL Cougar or CH-47SD Chinook helicopters
- Aviation facilities: Flight deck and enclosed hangar for up to 2 medium-lift helicopters
- Notes: Ships in class include: RSS Endurance (207); RSS Resolution (208); RSS Persistence (209); RSS Endeavour (210); HTMS Angthong (LPD-791)

The Endurance-class tank landing ships (LST) are the largest class of ships in the Republic of Singapore Navy (RSN). They were designed and built by Singapore Technologies (ST) Marine to replace the old County-class tank landing ships. The four ships form the Third Flotilla of the RSN.

== Planning and development ==
The Republic of Singapore Navy's intention to purchase the Endurance class was revealed by former Defence Minister Tony Tan during his visit to Tuas Naval Base on 3 August 1996. These ships were to replace the five ex-United States Navy (USN) County-class LSTs, which were acquired by Singapore from the United States in the 1970s. ST Marine was awarded the government contract to design and build the four ships – a significant milestone for the local defence and shipbuilding industries given the scale and extensiveness of the programme. Construction of Endurance began in early 1997, with the keel laid down at ST Marine's Benoi yard on 27 March 1997.

== List of ships ==
Name	Pennant number	Launched	Commissioned
RSS Endurance	207	14 March 1998	18 March 2000
RSS Resolution	208	1 August 1998	18 March 2000
RSS Persistence	209	13 March 1999	7 April 2001
RSS Endeavour	210	12 February 2000	7 April 2001
HTMS Angthong	LPD-791	21 March 2011	19 April 2012

== Design and construction ==
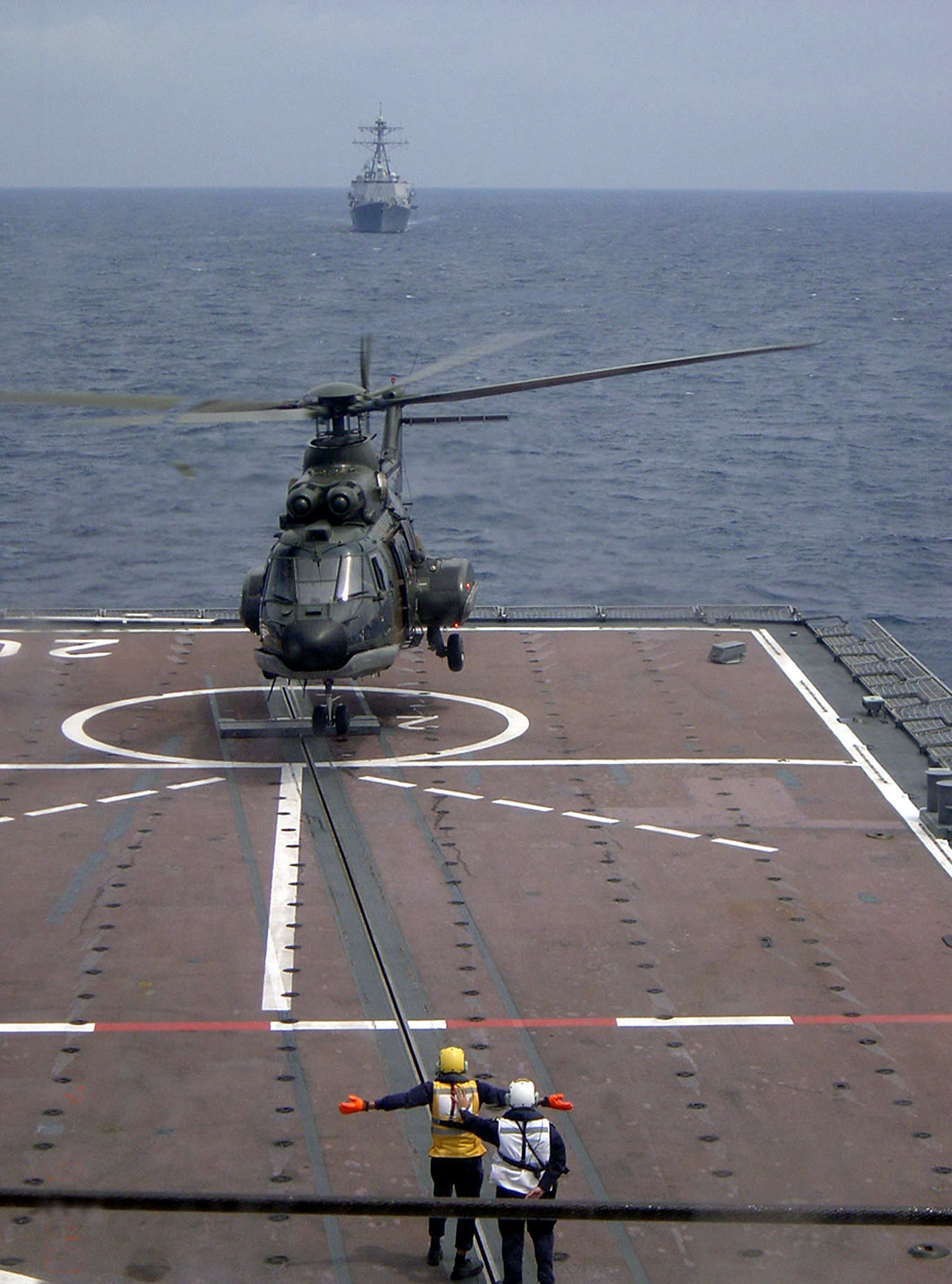
A Republic of Singapore Air Force Super Puma takes off from the flight deck of Resolution. Visible in the foreground is the ASIST system

The Endurance class is 40% larger than the previous County-class that they replaced, and travels almost twice as fast. Each ship is fitted with a well dock which can accommodate four landing craft, as well as a flight deck which can accommodate two medium lift helicopters. While the RSN describes the Endurance-class as LSTs, they lack the beaching capability traditionally associated with LSTs and their well docks and flight decks qualify the Endurance-class more as amphibious transport docks.

The Endurance class was built with a heavy emphasis on automation. Endurance became the first ship in the world to use official electronic navigational charts with the Electronic Chart Display and Information System (ECDIS) to circumnavigate the world.

The integrated bridge system allows the operator to access the navigation and communications systems, the ECDIS and other vital systems needed to sail the ship effectively, while the Ship Control, Monitoring and Management System controls, monitors and manages most of the platforms on board. The ships are also equipped with an Aircraft Ship Integrated Secure and Traverse (ASIST) system which helps in landing, securing, manoeuvring and traversing a helicopter, and eliminates the need for deck personnel to secure helicopters upon landing. All these result in a high degree of automation, with a reduced manning requirement of 65 crew members for a 6,500-tonne ship.

=== Proposed landing helicopter dock variant ===
The Endurance-160 is a proposed landing helicopter dock (LHD) variant of the Endurance class. A model of it was first displayed at the 2014 Singapore Airshow. It is longer than the Endurance class (retrospectively named the Endurance-140), with a full-length flight deck for helicopter operations. The Singapore Ministry of Defence would neither confirm nor deny that a vessel of the type would be built.

As Singapore is interested in acquiring the F-35B STOVL fighter aircraft, it is thought that such an LHD could be used as a light aircraft carrier. The STOVL F-35B needs a minimum of 168 m (551 ft) of runway to take off. It is thought that Singapore would need one to maintain sea lines of communication, as well as cope with fewer air bases in the future. However, operating the F-35B would incur greater procurement and operating costs compared to the conventional takeoff variants and greater fuel consumption needed for vertical landing, which could result in fewer aircraft being purchased. The design of the Endurance class would also have to be considerably revamped with a larger space to operate and store fixed-wing aircraft with a larger elevator and a ski ramp.

The Endurance-170, a further development of the LHD variant, has been offered to the UAE Navy. It would have a full load displacement of 19,000 tons. New features include a 76mm gun, vertical launching systems, RAM close-in weapon systems, and a hangar able to accommodate up to 10 medium-sized helicopters.

== Operational history ==
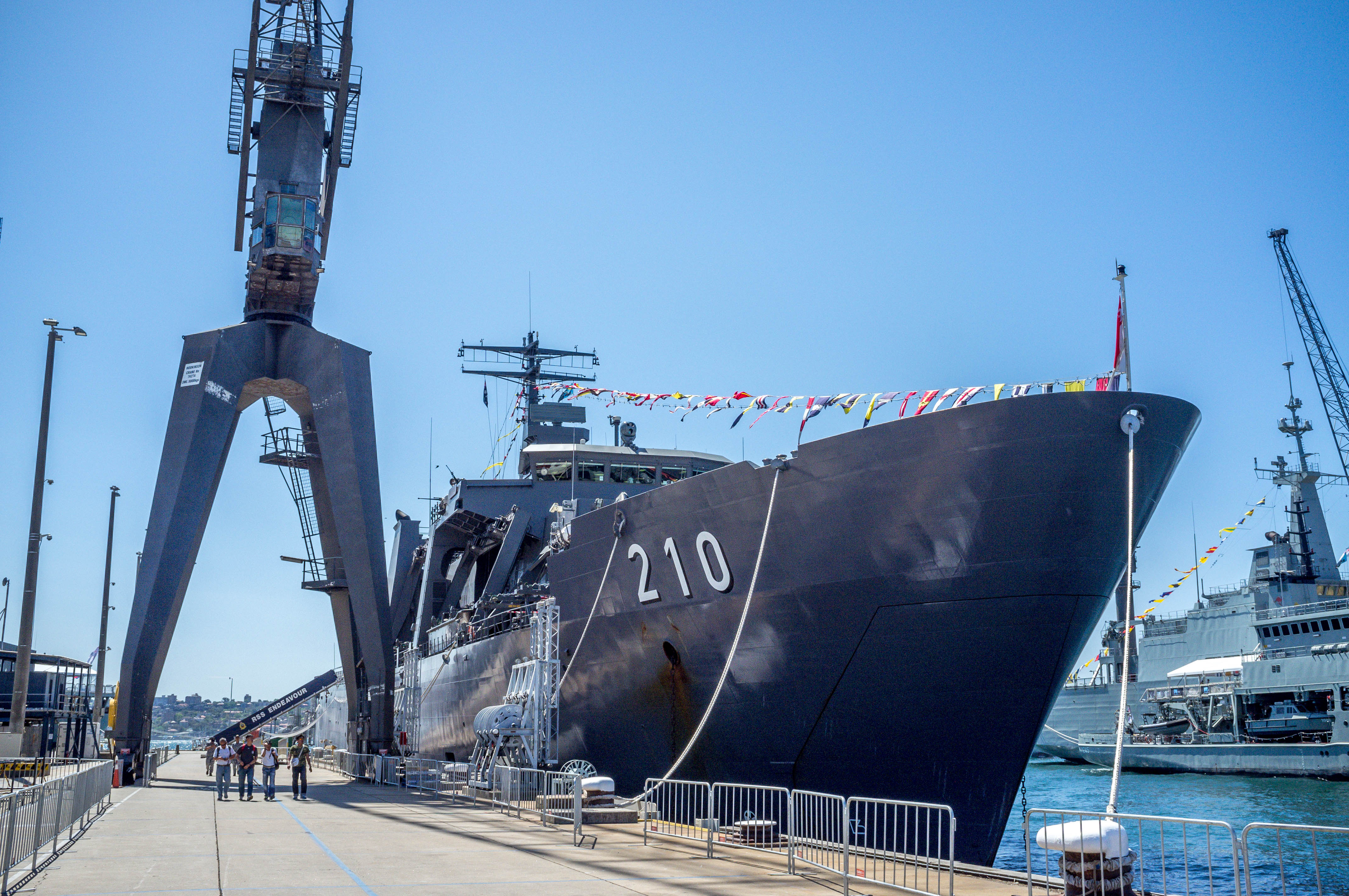
Endeavour at Garden Island during the International Fleet Review 2013

The ships provide sea transportation for personnel and equipment for Singapore Armed Forces' overseas training, as well as a training platform for RSN's midshipmen. RSS Endurance became the first RSN ship to circumnavigate the globe when it participated in the 6th USN International Naval Review in New York City, passing through both Panama and Suez canals.

The ships actively participate in various multilateral exercises annually. Resolution successfully fired a Mistral surface-to-air missile during Exercise Cooperation Afloat Readiness and Training in 2000, an annual joint naval exercise between the USN and RSN. Endurance participated as both a compliant and non-compliant vessel for boarding teams during Exercise Sea Sabre in 2004 as part of the Proliferation Security Initiative.

The ships are active participants in multinational peacekeeping efforts. As part of Singapore's contribution to the reconstruction efforts in Iraq, Endurance was sent to the Persian Gulf in October 2003 for two months. Resolution followed in November 2004 and Endeavour in February 2006. The ships conducted logistical tasks, such as replenishing supplies for other naval vessels in the Persian Gulf, and conducted patrols to enforce maritime presence. They also served as a platform for helicopter missions and maritime boarding operations missions by teams from other coalition countries when they inspected ships leaving Iraq. The last deployment saw Resolution taking on the expanded role of taking charge of coalition and Iraqi Navy ships to defend Iraq's oil platforms. On 1 September 2007, Persistence became the fourth ship to be deployed to the Persian Gulf in support of the multinational reconstruction efforts in Iraq. Resolution was subsequently tasked for RSN's fifth deployment to the Gulf on 30 August 2008.

The ships were also involved in various humanitarian relief operations, such as the tsunami-hit Indonesian province of Aceh in 2004. Within a few days of the disaster, Endurance sailed to Aceh in Indonesia to deliver emergency supplies and medical personnel to aid in the relief efforts. She was then joined by Persistence on 4 January 2005 and Endeavour on 16 January. Persistence also featured later in support of the efforts finding Indonesia AirAsia Flight 8501.

On 12 February 2009, Minister of Defence Teo Chee Hean announced that Persistence would join other naval forces off the coast of Somalia for three months in 2009. Comprising an LST with two Super Puma helicopters on board, the Singapore Armed Forces Task Group conducted daily helicopter surveillance flights and sector patrols to deter and disrupt piracy activities. The ship worked with the multinational Combined Task Force 151 to protect shipping in the Gulf of Aden. Since then, two additional SAF task groups have been deployed to the Gulf of Aden, Endurance from June to October 2010 and Endeavour from August 2011.

In December 2014, Persistence was deployed in the search for Airasia Flight QZ8501 after it crashed into the Java Sea on 28 December 2014; along with the RSN ships Supreme, Valour, and Kallang, MV Swift Rescue, and two Lockheed C-130H Hercules.

== Export ==
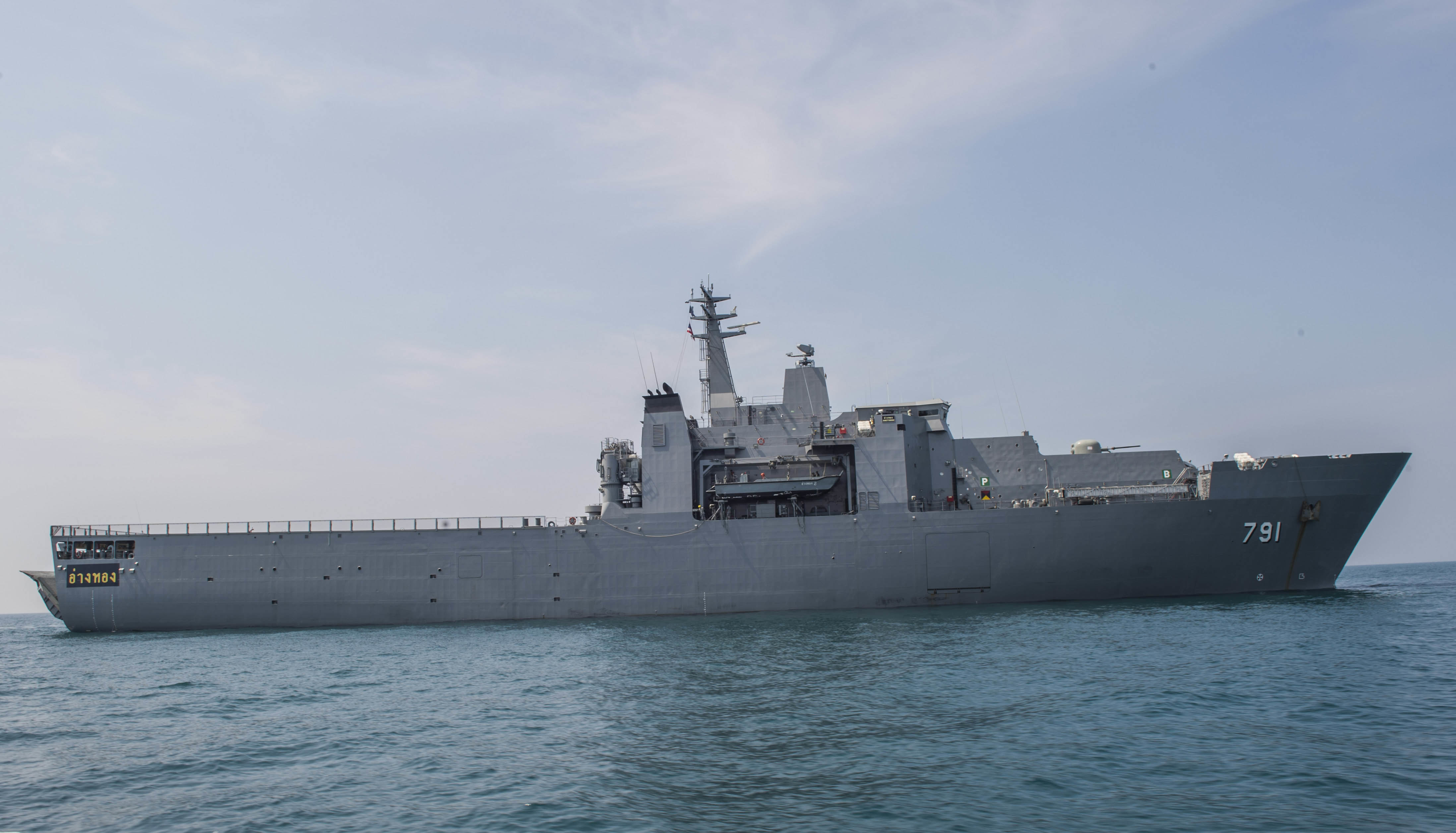
The Royal Thai Navy ship HTMS Angthong (LPD-791) navigates the waters off the coast of Thailand as part of an amphibious capabilities demonstration in support of exercise Cobra Gold (CG) 2016.

On 11 November 2008, a SGD 200 million contract was signed between ST Marine and Thailand for the sale of one unit of the Endurance-class LPD and its associated landing craft. The LPD would use the Terma C-Series system, which includes the C-Flex combat management system, C-Search radar suite which includes the Scanter 4100 radar and IFF, and the C-Fire fire control system.

On 21 March 2011, the new ship was christened HTMS Angthong (pennant number LPD-791) and was launched from ST Marine's dockyard by the wife of Admiral Khamthorn Pumhiran, Commander-In-Chief of Royal Thai Navy (RTN). The delivery of the ship was completed on 19 April 2012.

== Gallery ==
Port stern view of Endeavour at sea.

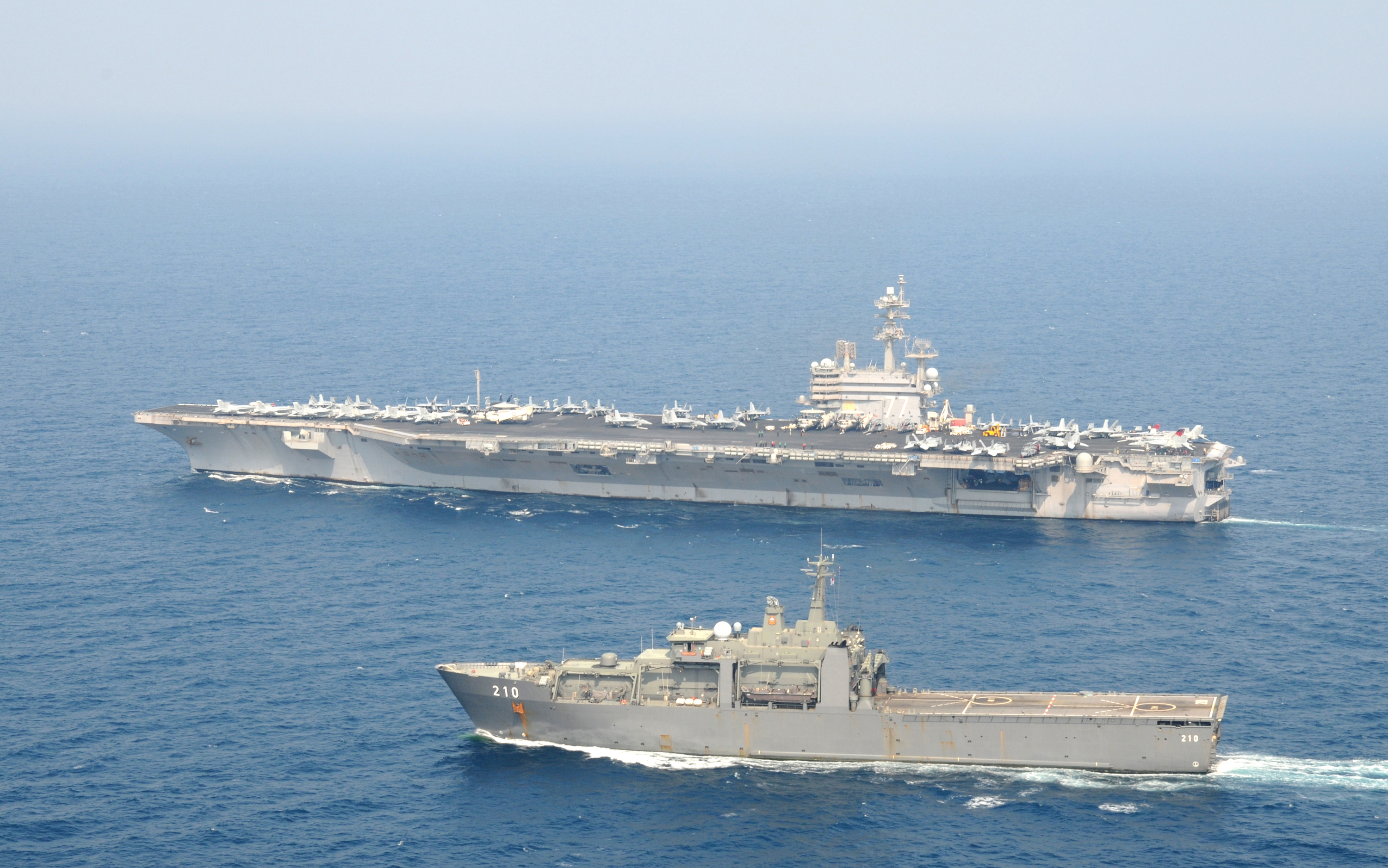
USS George H.W. Bush underway with RSS Endeavour in the Gulf of Aden.

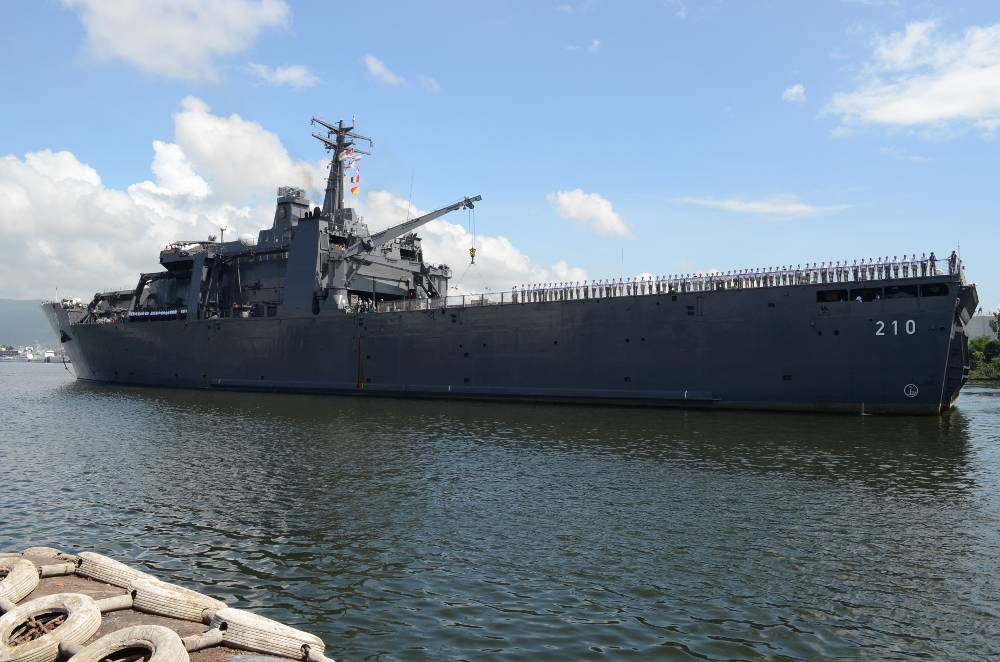
RSS Endeavour near Visakhapatnam.

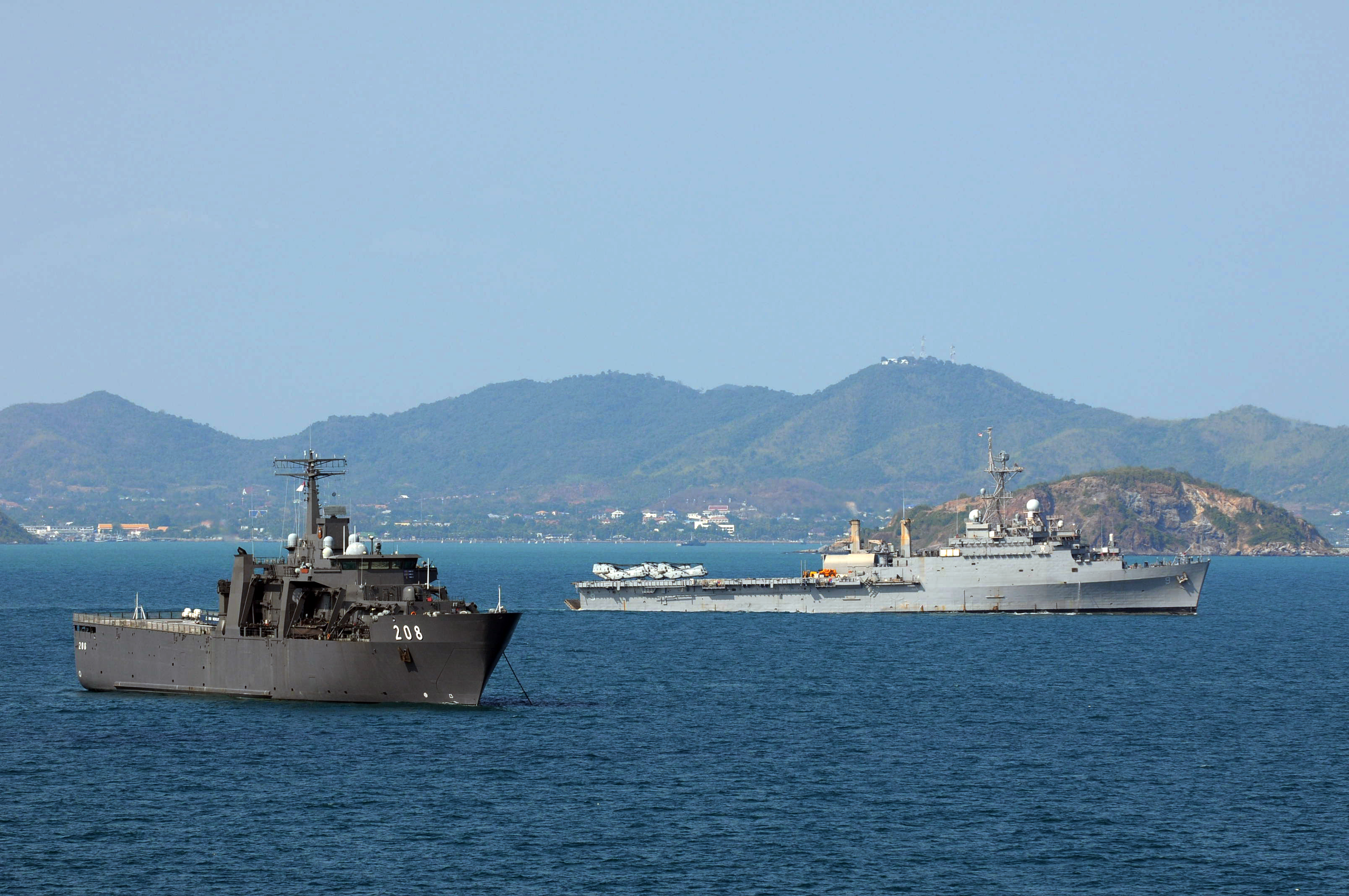
RSS Resolution at anchor in the Gulf of Thailand, with USS Denver passing behind during Cobra Gold '11.

== See also ==
- USS Holmes County (LST-836) – sold to RSN in 1975 as the original RSS Endurance (pennant number L201).

== Comparable ships ==
- Austin-class amphibious transport dock
- Makassar-class landing platform dock
- San Giorgio-class amphibious transport dock
- San Antonio-class amphibious transport dock
- Type 071 amphibious transport dock
