= RSS Endurance (207) =

Endurance-class landing ships of the Republic of Singapore Navy

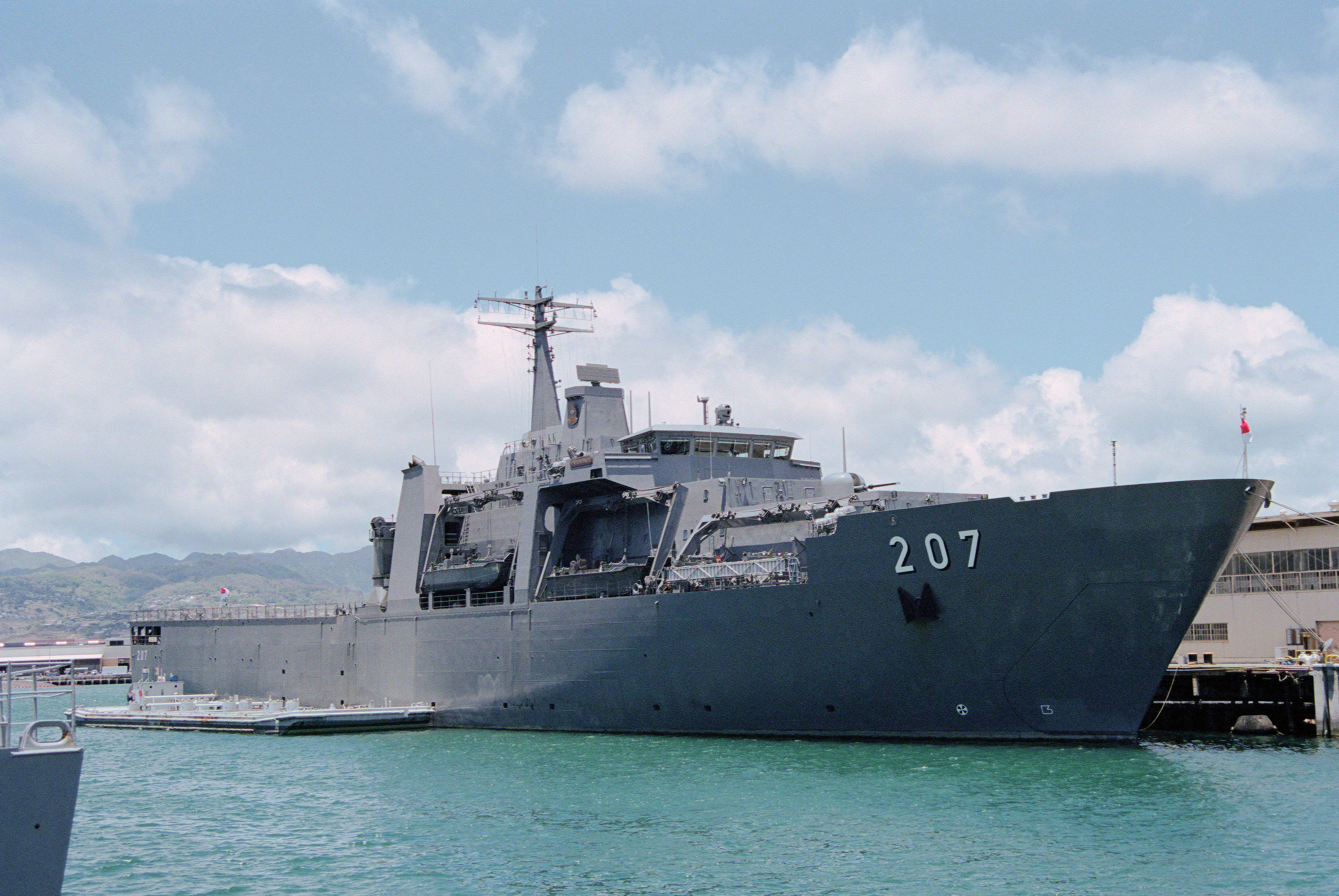
- RSS Endurance in 2000

History

Singapore
- Name: Endurance
- Namesake: Endurance
- Builder: ST Engineering
- Laid down: 27 March 1997
- Launched: 14 March 1998
- Commissioned: 18 March 2000
- Home port: Changi
- Identification: MMSI number: 566012500; Callsign: 9VTK; Pennant number: 207
- Status: Active

General characteristics
- Class & type: Endurance-class landing platform dock
- Displacement: Standard: 6,500 t (6,400 long tons; 7,200 short tons); Full load: 8,500 t (8,400 long tons; 9,400 short tons)
- Length: 141.0 m (462 ft 7 in)
- Beam: 21.0 m (68 ft 11 in)
- Draught: 5.0 m (16 ft 5 in)
- Ramps: 2 × (bow and stern)
- Installed power: 4 × Ruston 6RK215 diesel generators, each producing 875 kW (1,173 hp); Total output: 3,500 kW (4,690 shp)
- Propulsion: Combined diesel and diesel (CODAD) arrangement; 2 × Ruston 16RK 270 diesels, each producing 5,500 kW (7,400 hp), coupled to two Kamewa controllable-pitch propellers; Total output: 11,000 kW (14,800 shp)
- Speed: In excess of 15 kn (28 km/h; 17 mph)
- Range: 5,000 nmi (9,300 km; 5,800 mi) at 15 kn (28 km/h; 17 mph)
- Boats & landing craft carried: 4 × 13 m (43 ft) Fast Craft Equipment & Utility (FCEU) on davits; 2 × 25 m (82 ft) Fast Craft Utility (FCU) inside well deck
- Capacity: 18 tanks, 20 vehicles and bulk cargo
- Troops: > 350–500
- Crew: 65 (8 officers and 57 men)
- Sensors & processing systems: Search radar: IAI/ELTA EL/M-2238; Navigation radar: Kelvin Hughes Type 1007 (I band); Weapon control: CS Defense NAJIR 2000 electro-optronic director
- Electronic warfare & decoys: ESM/ECM: RAFAEL RAN 1101; Decoys: 2 × GEC Marconi Marine Shield III 102 mm sextuple fixed chaff/decoy launcher
- Armament: Anti-air: Mistral missiles launched from 2 × Simbad twin launcher mounts; Main gun: 1 × Oto Melara 76 mm super rapid gun; Autocannons: 2 × 25mm M242 Bushmaster Mk 38 Mod 2 (with stabilised Typhoon weapon sighting system, mounted amidships on port and starboard side); Machine guns: 4 × STK 50MG 12.7 mm (0.50 in) HMGs
- Aircraft carried: AS 332M Super Puma or AS532UL/AL Cougar or CH-47SD Chinook helicopters
- Aviation facilities: Flight deck and enclosed hangar for up to 2 medium-lift helicopters

Endurance (207) is the lead ship of the Endurance-class landing platform dock of the Republic of Singapore Navy.

== Development ==
The navy's intention to purchase the Endurance-class was revealed by former Defence Minister Dr. Tony Tan during his visit to Tuas Naval Base on 3 August 1996. These ships were to replace the five ex-United States Navy (USN) County-class LSTs, which were acquired by Singapore from the United States in the 1970s. ST Marine was awarded the government contract to design and build the four ships – a significant milestone for the local defence and shipbuilding industries given the scale and extensiveness of the programme.

== Construction and career ==
She was laid down on 27 March 1997 and launched on 14 March 1998. She was commissioned on 18 March 2000 with the hull number 207.

Endurance participated as both a compliant and non-compliant vessel for boarding teams during Exercise Sea Sabre in 2004 as part of the Proliferation Security Initiative.

RSS Endurance sailed to Aceh in Indonesia to deliver emergency supplies and medical personnel to aid in the relief efforts after a tsunami. She was then joined by Persistence on 4 January 2005 and Endeavour on 16 January.

RSS Endurance became the first RSN ship to circumnavigate the globe when it participated in the 6th USN International Naval Review in New York City, passing through both Panama and Suez Canal in 2000.
