= Aircraft Ship Integrated Secure and Traverse =

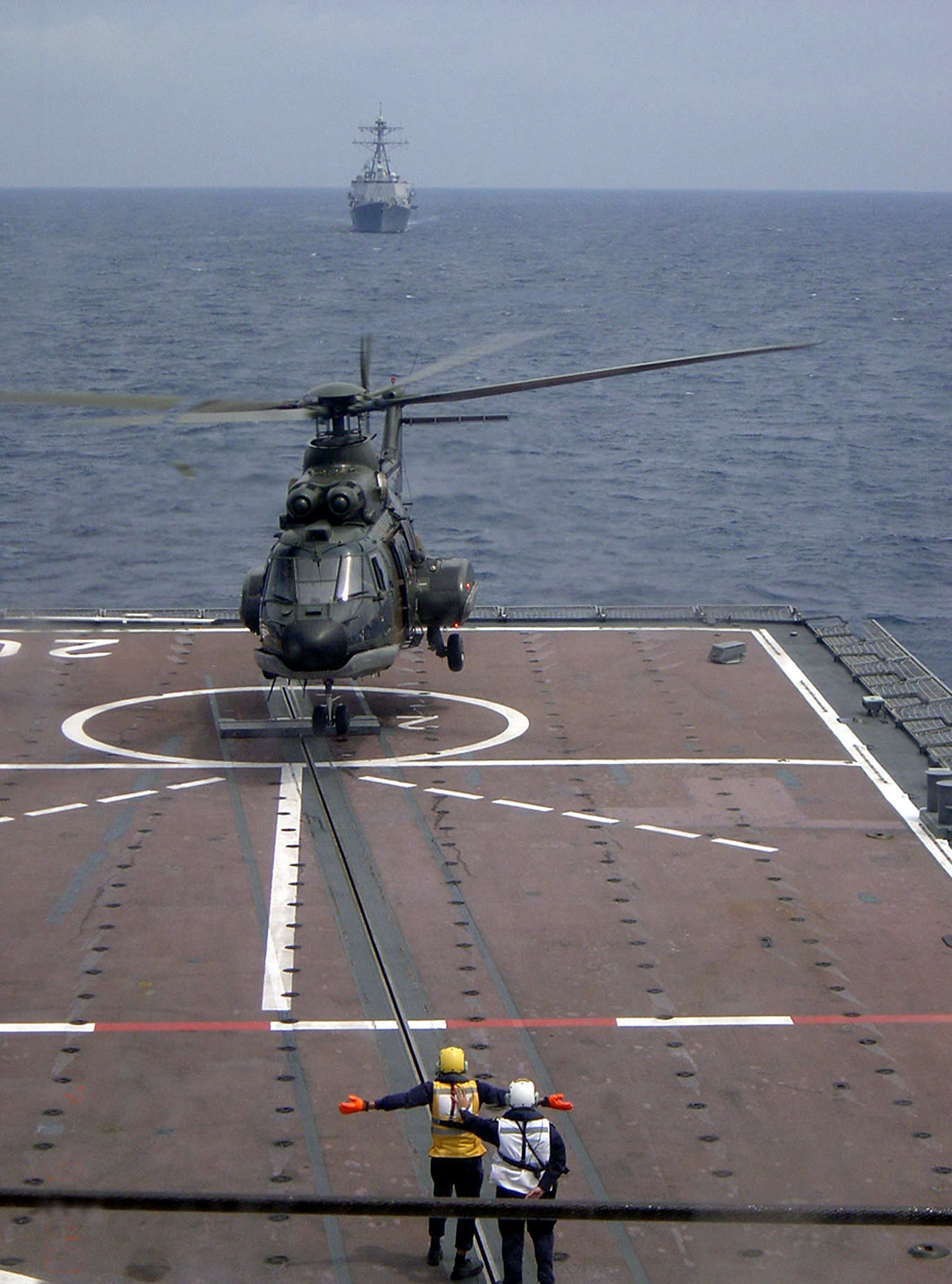
An RSAF Super Puma takes off from the flight deck of the RSS Resolution – an Endurance class LST. Visible in the foreground is the Aircraft Ship Integrated Secure and Traverse (ASIST) system.

The Aircraft Ship Integrated Secure and Traverse (ASIST) system is a shipboard helicopter landing system developed by Canadian company Indal Technologies (now part of US conglomerate Curtiss-Wright). ASIST completed sea trials by July 31, 1992, and production units are in operation with the Chilean Navy, Republic of Singapore Navy, Turkish Navy and United States Navy.

== History ==
Indal was involved in developing the beartrap hauldown system for the Royal Canadian Navy (RCN). Beartrap used a cable, attaching the helicopter to the ship, to pull the aircraft down to the flight deck. Attaching the cable required personnel on deck, and the system's equipment occupied significant volume and weight. The ASIST recovery concept to eliminate these disadvantages. Indal proposed ASIST to the Canadian military's Directorate of Marine and Electrical Engineering (DMEE) in February 1985, and the company received a contract to develop ASIST as the Recovery Assist Securing and Traversing (RAST) Mk III. Canada was interested in a recovery system that was lighter than the one used by the Halifax-class frigates - then in development - and which could handle the EH101 helicopter, the prospective replacement for the Sikorsky CH-124 Sea King. The EH101 was heavier with a nose wheel instead of a tail wheel; the wheel placement made it incompatible with existing RCN hauldown systems.

== Mode of Operation ==
The ASIST system employs a sophisticated electro-optic tracking system which detects a laser beacon-equipped helicopter. The system tracks the helicopter and provide real time helicopter position simultaneously via visual cues to the pilot. A computer-controlled rapid securing device will also be driven by the position data to track the helicopter at low hover. Once the system has detected that the helicopter has landed on the deck, the securing device automatically approaches the helicopter and secures it. The securing device and traversing system are then used to align the helicopter with the deck tracks and manoeuvre it into a hangar, all without the need for human intervention. All ASIST electrical and mechanical systems are modular and are housed in the hangar or below deck level to minimize space and weight requirements.

== Sources ==
- Johnson, Ron (September 1989). "RAST MK III: A New-Generation Helicopter Handling System". Maritime Engineering Journal. Director General Maritime Equipment Program Management. ISSN 0713-0058.
