= Lokata Company =

British technology manufacturer

The Lokata Company (pronounced low-kay-tah, "locator") was formed in the late 1970s in Falmouth, Cornwall, UK. The first product was a combined marine receiver and direction finder, for yachts and small boats. From there, the company designed and manufactured products for the marine electronics market, including communications receivers, Navtex receivers, radar detectors, transponders and emergency position indicating radio beacons (EPIRBs).

On November 22, 1982, Lokata filed a patent application for its "Watchman", a passive marine radar detector. and spent £50,000 developing the system.

In 1983 a New Scientist article covered a story about the inventor of the Lokata product, the "Watchman", that he had independently re-invented part of the well-known Exocet missile's guidance system in his invention. "Lokata had not realised that it was treading on a defence secret." This led to some publicised controversy involving the MOD and the Patent Office and thus prevented the firm to sell the gadget.

The Ministry of Defence tried to requisition the inventor's patent, but he defied the secrecy order and went public, and a public row arose about possible loss of employment making Lokata Watchmans in Falmouth, Cornwall where he lived.

In 2001, support for Lokata EPIRB products was transferred to Sartech Engineering Ltd.

The company was acquired by Kelvin Hughes Ltd, and eventually moved to Hainault in Essex. Production of Lokata-branded products has ceased, as the company now concentrates on products for commercial shipping. Thousands of Lokata products remain in use worldwide.
