= Tuas Naval Base =

Military base in Singapore

Coordinates: 1°17′38.02″N 103°39′50.65″E

Tuas Naval Base (TNB) is the second naval base of the Republic of Singapore Navy (RSN). Located at the western tip of Singapore, it occupies 0.28 km^{2} (0.11 sq mi) of land. It was officially opened on 2 September 1994, by Goh Chok Tong, the Prime Minister of Singapore(at the time).

For about two decades, Brani Naval Base was the RSN's only base. An expansion of the fleet in the early 1980s meant that more space was needed for the fleet and its shore infrastructure. However, this was not possible as the land around Brani was reserved for use by the port authority to develop container facilities. As a result, Tuas was selected as the site for a second naval base.

Better utilisation of space at TNB resulted in two and a half times more berthing space than Brani, even though TNB only has a shoreline of 850 m (0.5 mi). Provision was also made for recreational facilities. Automation was incorporated into the design of TNB to reduce manpower requirements, such as mechanical ramps for the loading and unloading of vehicles and an automatic storage and retrieval system. It also has a floating dock which can lift 600 tonnes and transfer a ship from sea to land to facilitate repairs and maintenance.

Currently, the Littoral Mission Vessel, the missile corvettes, patrol vessels and mine counter-measures vessels are based at TNB.
