= EL/M-2238 STAR =

Naval radar system

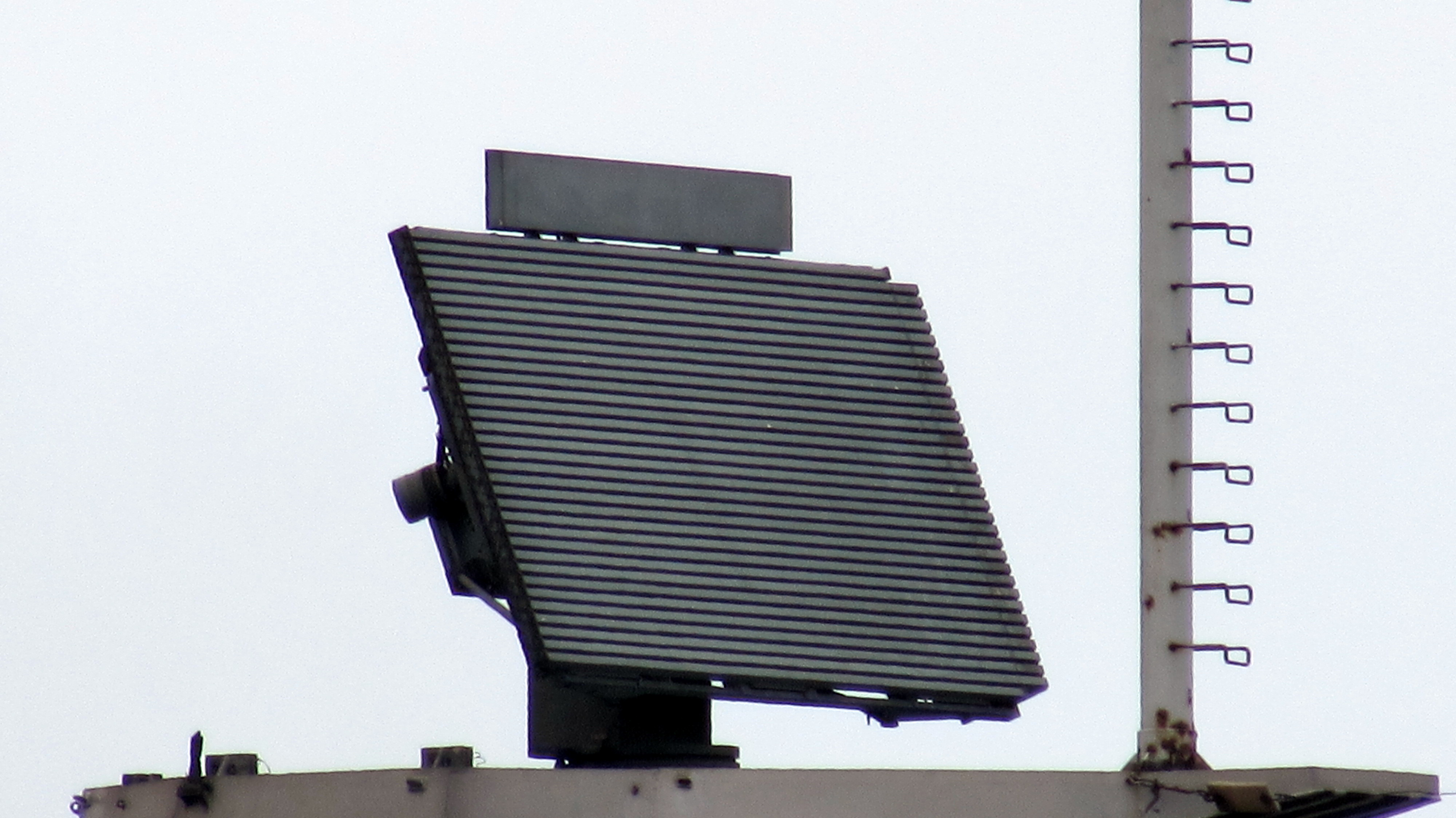
- EL/M-2238 STAR onboard a Shivalik class frigate of the Indian Navy
- Country of origin: Israel
- Type: Multi-purpose Pulse Doppler multi-mode 3D radar
- Frequency: S band
- Range: 350 km Automatic track initiation from 28 km for missiles
- Azimuth: 0–360°

The EL/M-2238 3D-STAR is a multi-purpose air and surface-search naval radar system developed by IAI Elta for medium-sized ships like corvettes and frigates. STAR is an acronym of Surveillance & Threat Alert Radar.

== Design and description ==
It is a 3D multi-beam and multi-mode fully coherent pulse Doppler search radar which functions in the S band (2-4 GHz). It can perform both surface and aerial search simultaneously. It is designed to support anti-air and surface-gunnery systems. The antenna in the Doppler sensor has a planar array for 3D multi-beam operations and a vertical array of strip radiators. It has programmable signal processing and is stabilized within a roll and pitch of 20 degrees. It comes in three variants - a larger dual-face version, a medium version and a small single-face version.

Type	Instrumentation range (km)	Fighter aircraft detection (km)	Automatic missile detection (km)	Scan rate (rpm)	Above/below-deck weight (kg)	Power requirement (kW)
Small	200	150	20	12/24	700/1300	20
Medium	250	200	25	N/A	840/1300	21
Large	350	250	28	6/15	1500/2000	34

== Operators ==
The radar is installed in ships of the following navies:

Indian Navy

- Godavari-class frigates
- Shivalik class frigates

Republic of Singapore Navy

- Endurance-class landing platform dock

Bolivarian Navy of Venezuela

- Mariscal Sucre class frigate - Installed while upgrading the first two ships Mariscal Sucre (F-21) and Almirante Brión (F-22). Installed on the stub mast.

== See also ==
- EL/M-2080 Green Pine
- EL/M-2248 MF-STAR
