= Hensoldt UK =

British company

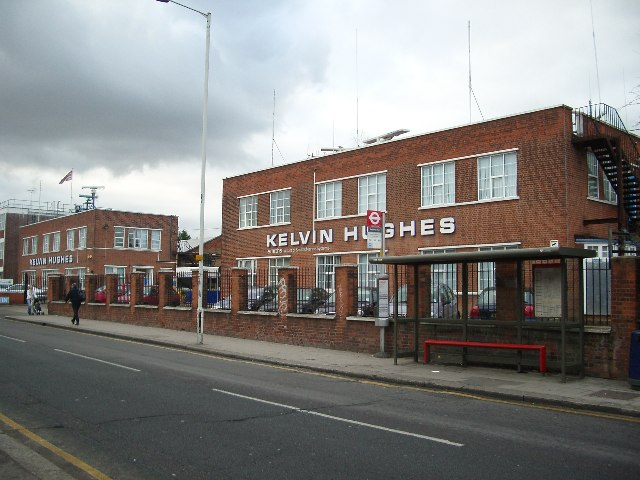
- Type: Subsidiary
- Industry: Defence Security Maritime
- Founded: 1947
- Headquarters: 6 Mollison Avenue; Enfield; UK
- Number of locations: 5 offices 5 countries
- Key people: Russell Gould, CEO
- Products: SharpEye radar
- Parent: Hensoldt
- Website: uk.hensoldt.net

Hensoldt UK, formerly Kelvin Hughes, is a British company specialising in the design and manufacture of navigation and surveillance systems and a supplier of navigational data to both the commercial marine and government marketplace.

The company provides radar systems to navies, governments, coastlines, ports and VTS installations as well as radars for land based security and surveillance applications.

Part of Kelvin Hughes' history includes producing the first Type Approved commercial radar in 1947 as well as the first paper chart tracing service in 1971. Modern day products that Kelvin Hughes sell include SharpEye, a solid state radar with clutter management and Doppler processing.

== History ==
=== Kelvin ===
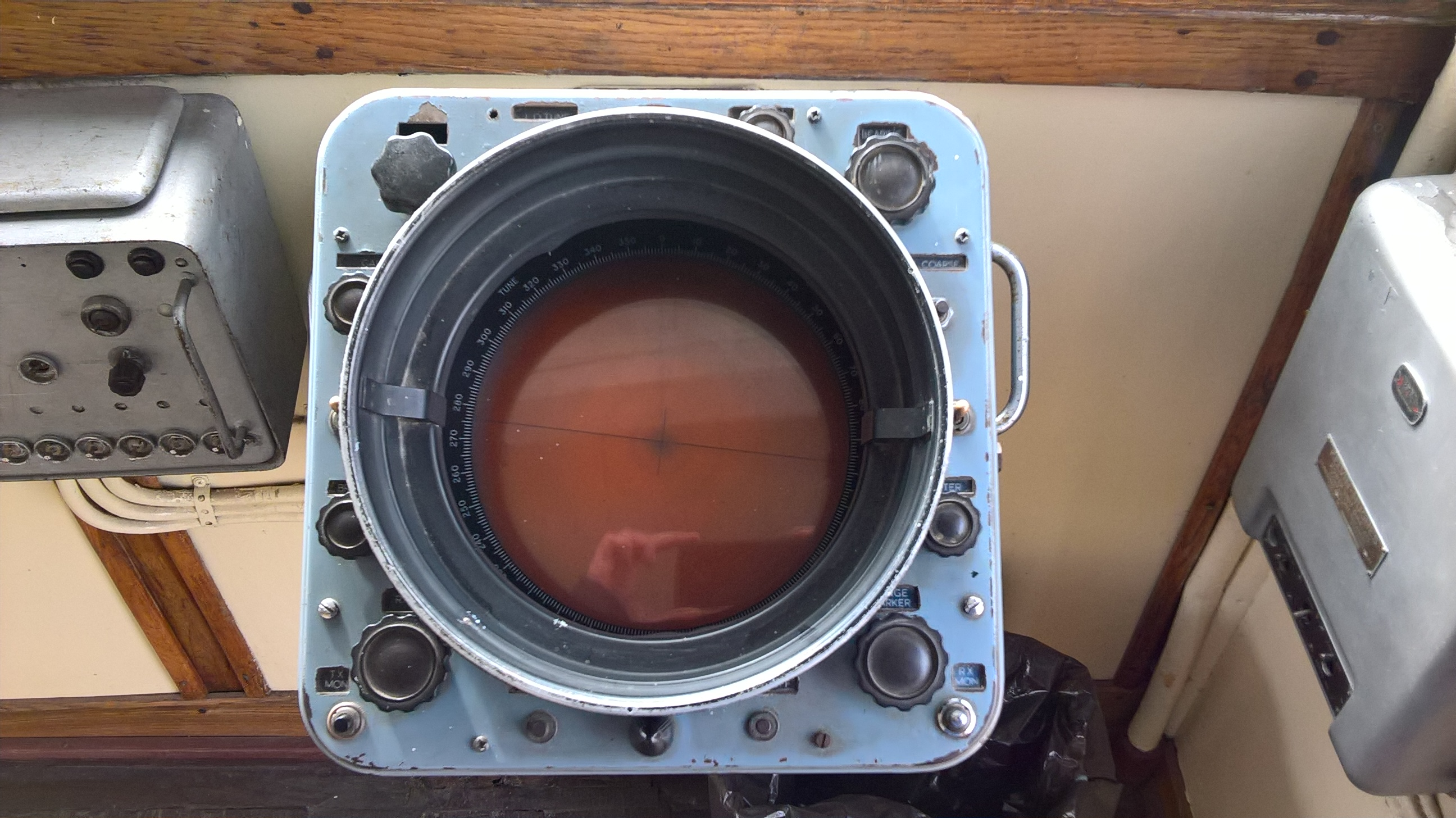
Kelvin Hughes Type 14/9 Radar from front

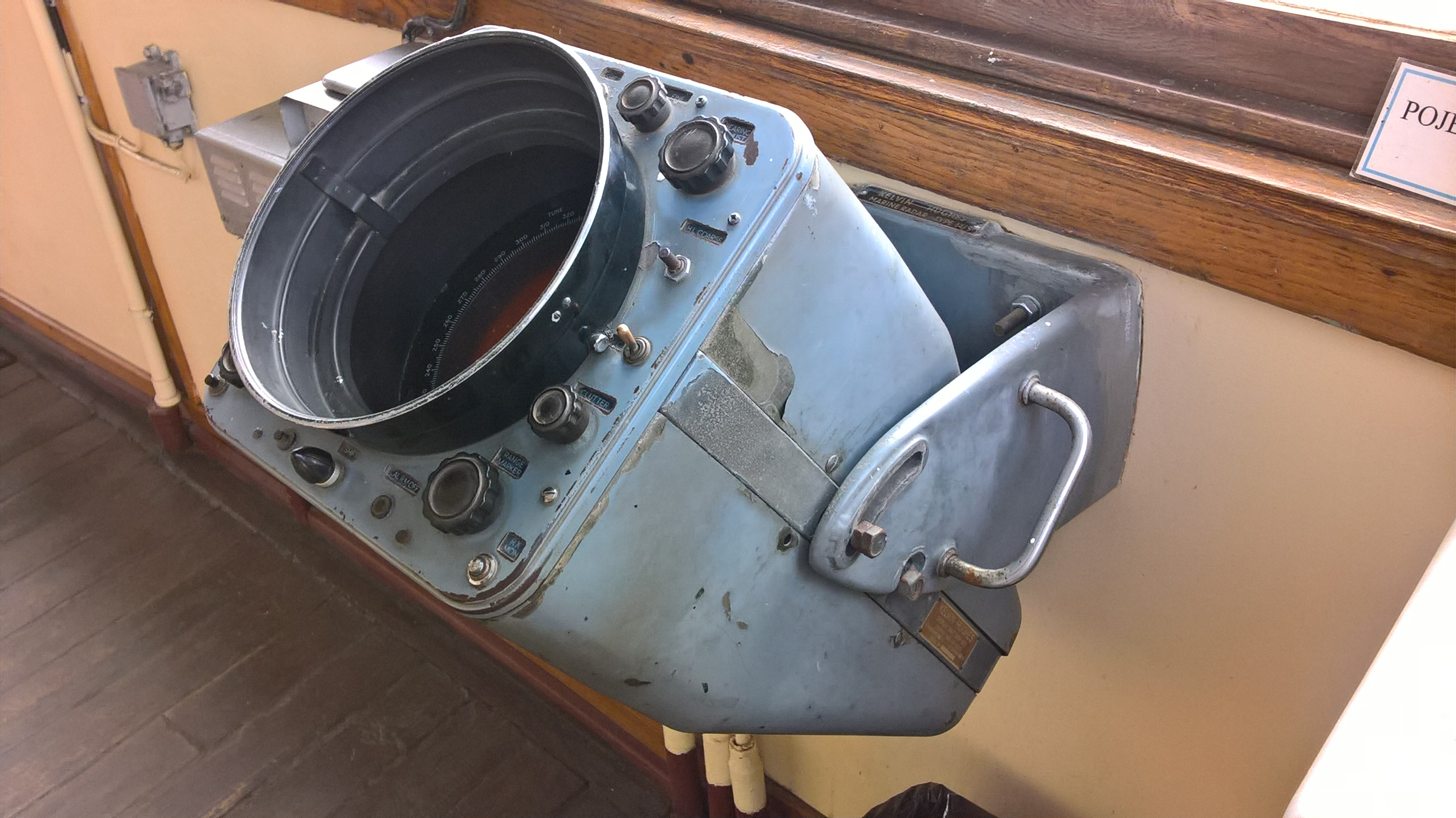
Kelvin Hughes Type 14/9 Radar from side

Selection of Kelvin Hughes products in Redbridge Museum

The Kelvin connection is based upon the professional relationship between William Thomson (later-Lord Kelvin) (1824–1907), Professor of Natural Philosophy at Glasgow University from 1846–1899 and James White (1824–1884), a Glasgow-based Optical Instrument Maker. White's association with Thomson lasted until he died, but without any legal deeds of co-partnership White bore the financial risks of their working partnership.

James White founded the firm of James White, Optician and Philosophical Instrument Makers in Glasgow in 1850 and was involved in the supply and maintenance of apparatus for Thomson's university laboratory and worked with him on experimental constructions. By 1854, White was producing electrical instruments such as electrometers and electrical balances from Thomson's designs.

William Thomson was appointed a director of the Atlantic Telegraph Company in 1856 and in 1858 was 'electrician' on HMS Agamemnon that laid the first transatlantic telegraph cable. Unfortunately this cable failed soon after it was laid.

In 1857, White entered into a short-lived partnership, White & Barr, with John Barr. The partnership lasted until 1860 when it was dissolved and White reverted to his previous company name of James White. White was declared bankrupt in August 1861, and then discharged four months later.

In 1866 the Great Eastern laid the first successful transatlantic telegraph cable and Thomson was knighted. During this time White was involved in the production of machinery that Thomson had designed to address problems encountered in laying cables at sea, helping to make possible the first transatlantic cable connection. At the same time, he continued to make a whole range of more conventional instruments such as microscopes, telescopes and surveying equipment.

During 1870 White was largely responsible for equipping Sir William's laboratory in the new University premises at Gilmorehill in his capacity as Philosophical Instrument Maker to the University of Glasgow.

In 1874 Sir William investigated the Mariner's compass for a magazine article. This initiated his extensive work on compasses and marine instruments. From 1876 White was producing accurate compasses for metal ships to Sir William's design, and this became an important part of his business in the latter years of his life.

After White's death in 1884, Sir William continued to maintain his interest in the White business and raised most of the capital needed to construct and equip new workshops in Cambridge Street, Glasgow. At the Cambridge Street premises, the company continued to make the compass Sir William had designed during the 1870s and to supply it in some quantity, especially to the Admiralty. The Admiralty adopted the patent compass as a standard for Royal Navy use in 1889. At the same time, the firm became increasingly involved in the design, production and sale of electrical apparatus. White's business continued under the same name, being administered by Matthew Edwards and David Reid. This continued until 1891 when Matthew Edward left to set up his own company. In 1890 the company sued Alexander Hughes for infringement of compass patents.

Sir William was raised to the Peerage as Baron Kelvin of Largs in 1892. In 1899, Lord Kelvin resigned from his University chair and, in 1900 became a director in the newly formed private limited liability company, Kelvin & James White Ltd, which acquired the business of James White. At the same time, Lord Kelvin's nephew, James Thomson Bottomley FRSE (1845–1926), joined the firm. The firm manufactured binnacle compasses and deep sea sounding machines, many of which were installed on the great ships built on Clyde side.

Around 1904, a London branch office was opened, which by 1915 had taken the name Kelvin, White & Hutton Ltd.

From 1918 Wilfrid O. White sold Kelvin and White compasses in the USA under the name of Kelvin and Wilfrid O. White Co., Boston and New York. Wilfrid O. White also sold his own patented compasses under the same name.

In 1913 Dr Bottomley became chairman of Kelvin & James White Ltd and the firm changed its name, becoming Kelvin Bottomley & Baird Ltd. Alfred Baird had been a compass adjuster with the firm since 1884. Kelvin, Bottomley and Baird Ltd manufactured Marine navigation equipment such as "Kelvite" binnacle compasses and sounding machines at the Kelvin Works, Hillington, Glasgow.

In 1934 Kelvin Bottomley & Baird Ltd built an instrument factory at Basingstoke which was later to become the Smiths Industries Aerospace site.

Following the destruction of the London offices in the Blitz of 1941, discussions were initiated with Henry Hughes & Sons Ltd regarding collaboration which resulted in the establishing of the joint venture company Marine Instruments Ltd at 107, Fenchurch Street, London in 1942.

=== The Hughes connection ===
The Hughes family were originally clockmakers in the East End of London who progressed into supplying sextants and marine chronometers to ships coming into the River Thames.

In 1712 Thomas Hughes became a member of the Worshipful Company of Clockmakers at the age of 26 and was elected as Master of the Worshipful Company of Clockmakers in 1742. His son, Thomas Hughes (junior) had his business at 25 New Bond Street London and was elected as Master of the Worshipful Company of Clockmakers in 1762.

In 1781 William Hughes, believed to be the son of Thomas Hughes Junior, was elected freeman of the Worshipful Company of Clockmakers and sold a cabin clock to Captain Cook. Joseph Hughes, believed to be the son of William born in 1781, lived and worked at 16 Queen Street, Ratcliffe. He was to become a well-known maker of quadrants and compasses. His son Henry Hughes was born in 1816.

In 1838 Henry Hughes & Sons was founded at 120 (later at 59), Fenchurch Street, London as a maker of chronographs and scientific instruments. Henry died in 1879 and his son Alexander succeeded him as chairman.

The firm was incorporated as Henry Hughes & Sons Ltd in 1903 and opened a production facility in Forest Gate. Alexander's son Arthur was works manager and his elder brother Henry Alexander Hughes was director and secretary.

In 1915 the site at Hainault was purchased and in 1917 the first part of the factory was opened. This site is the current headquarters of the modern Kelvin Hughes Ltd.

In 1923, the company produced the first practical recording echo sounder.

In 1935, S Smith & Son Ltd acquired a controlling interest in the company. This resulted in the development of new marine and aircraft instruments and a major expansion of the Hainault factory.

Following the destruction of the Fenchurch Street offices in the Blitz of 1941, discussions with Kelvin, Bottomley & Baird Ltd resulted in the establishing of the joint venture company Marine Instruments Ltd at 107, Fenchurch Street, London in 1942.

=== Kelvin Hughes ===
Kelvin Hughes Ltd was formed in 1947 by the merger between the scientific instrument manufacturing firms of Henry Hughes & Son Ltd, London, England, and Kelvin Bottomley & Baird Ltd, Glasgow, Scotland with Marine Instruments Ltd acting as regional agents in the UK. Kelvin & Hughes Ltd were essentially a part of Smith's Industries Ltd founded in 1944 as the successors of S Smith & Son Ltd.

Kelvin & Hughes Ltd was liquidated in 1966 but the name was continued as the Kelvin Hughes division of Smiths Group plc.

In 1990 Kelvin Hughes acquired Lokata Ltd assimilating their range of NAVTEX, EPIRB and SART products.

During 1994 the Chart and Maritime division was enhanced with the acquisition of Brown and Perring (London) and Observator (Rotterdam)

Kelvin Hughes acquired QUBIT in August 1994 adding their range of integrated navigation, data acquisition and processing systems to the product range.

In November 2007 Kelvin Hughes was bought out from Smiths Group plc and operated independently as Kelvin Hughes Ltd under part ownership by ECI Partners.

Kelvin Hughes announced it was sold to Hensoldt by ECI Partners on 29 June 2017.

== See also ==
- James Goodfellow
