= List of ships of the Republic of Singapore Navy =

This is a list of ships in the Republic of Singapore Navy.

== Active fleet ==
=== Submarines ===
Class	In service	Origin	Picture	Type	Builder	Ship	No.	Comm.	Disp.	Notes
Attack submarines (6)
Archer class Former Västergötland class	2	Sweden		Attack submarines	Kockums	RSS Archer	–	2 Dec 2011 (former 27 Nov 1987)	1,500 tonnes (submerged); 1,400 tonnes (surfaced)	Purchased second hand from the Swedish Navy.
Archer class Former Västergötland class	2	Sweden		Attack submarines	Kockums	RSS Swordsman	–	30 Apr 2013 (former 20 Oct 1988)	1,500 tonnes (submerged); 1,400 tonnes (surfaced)	Purchased second hand from the Swedish Navy.
Invincible class Type 218SG	4 (+ 2 on order)	Germany		Attack submarine	TKMS	RSS Invincible	–	24 Sep 2024	2,200 tonnes (submerged); 2,000 tonnes (surfaced)	
Invincible class Type 218SG	4 (+ 2 on order)	Germany		Attack submarine	TKMS	RSS Impeccable	–	24 Sep 2024	2,200 tonnes (submerged); 2,000 tonnes (surfaced)	
Invincible class Type 218SG	4 (+ 2 on order)	Germany		Attack submarine	TKMS	RSS Illustrious	–		2,200 tonnes (submerged); 2,000 tonnes (surfaced)	
Invincible class Type 218SG	4 (+ 2 on order)	Germany		Attack submarine	TKMS	RSS Inimitable	–		2,200 tonnes (submerged); 2,000 tonnes (surfaced)	

=== Surface combat fleet ===
Class	In service	Origin	Picture	Type	Builder	Ship	No.	Comm.	Disp.	Notes
Frigates (6)
Formidable class Derived from La Fayette class	6	France		Frigate	DCNS	RSS Formidable	68	5 May 2007	3,200 tonnes	During the ship's voyage, it was Supported By S-70B Seahawk Naval Helicopter from 123 Sqadron RSAF
Formidable class Derived from La Fayette class	6	Singapore; France		Frigate	ST Engineering (Marine); DCNS (design)	RSS Intrepid	69	5 Feb 2008	3,200 tonnes	During the ship's voyage, it was Supported By S-70B Seahawk Naval Helicopter from 123 Sqadron RSAF
Formidable class Derived from La Fayette class	6	Singapore; France		Frigate	ST Engineering (Marine); DCNS (design)	RSS Steadfast	70	5 Feb 2008	3,200 tonnes	During the ship's voyage, it was Supported By S-70B Seahawk Naval Helicopter from 123 Sqadron RSAF
Formidable class Derived from La Fayette class	6	Singapore; France		Frigate	ST Engineering (Marine); DCNS (design)	RSS Tenacious	71	5 Feb 2008	3,200 tonnes	During the ship's voyage, it was Supported By S-70B Seahawk Naval Helicopter from 123 Sqadron RSAF
Formidable class Derived from La Fayette class	6	Singapore; France		Frigate	ST Engineering (Marine); DCNS (design)	RSS Stalwart	72	16 Jan 2009	3,200 tonnes	During the ship's voyage, it was Supported By S-70B Seahawk Naval Helicopter from 123 Sqadron RSAF
Formidable class Derived from La Fayette class	6	Singapore; France		Frigate	ST Engineering (Marine); DCNS (design)	RSS Supreme	73	16 Jan 2009	3,200 tonnes	During the ship's voyage, it was Supported By S-70B Seahawk Naval Helicopter from 123 Sqadron RSAF
Corvettes (6)
Victory class Derived from MGB 62	6	Singapore; Germany		Missile corvette	ST Engineering (Marine); Friedrich Lürssen Werft (design)	RSS Victory	88	18 Aug 1990	530 tonnes	
Victory class Derived from MGB 62	6	Singapore; Germany		Missile corvette	ST Engineering (Marine); Friedrich Lürssen Werft (design)	RSS Valour	89	18 Aug 1990	530 tonnes	
Victory class Derived from MGB 62	6	Singapore; Germany		Missile corvette	ST Engineering (Marine); Friedrich Lürssen Werft (design)	RSS Vigilance	90	18 Aug 1990	530 tonnes	
Victory class Derived from MGB 62	6	Singapore; Germany		Missile corvette	ST Engineering (Marine); Friedrich Lürssen Werft (design)	RSS Valiant	91	25 May 1991	530 tonnes	
Victory class Derived from MGB 62	6	Singapore; Germany		Missile corvette	ST Engineering (Marine); Friedrich Lürssen Werft (design)	RSS Vigour	92	25 May 1991	530 tonnes	
Victory class Derived from MGB 62	6	Singapore; Germany		Missile corvette	ST Engineering (Marine); Friedrich Lürssen Werft (design)	RSS Vengeance	93	25 May 1991	530 tonnes	
Patrol vessels (12)
Independence class	8	Singapore		Littoral mission vessel	ST Engineering (Marine)	RSS Independence	15	5 May 2017	1,250 tonnes	
Independence class	8	Singapore		Littoral mission vessel	ST Engineering (Marine)	RSS Sovereignty	16	14 Nov 2017	1,250 tonnes	
Independence class	8	Singapore		Littoral mission vessel	ST Engineering (Marine)	RSS Unity	17	14 Nov 2017	1,250 tonnes	
Independence class	8	Singapore		Littoral mission vessel	ST Engineering (Marine)	RSS Justice	18	26 Sep 2018	1,250 tonnes	
Independence class	8	Singapore		Littoral mission vessel	ST Engineering (Marine)	RSS Indomitable	19	26 Sep 2018	1,250 tonnes	
Independence class	8	Singapore		Littoral mission vessel	ST Engineering (Marine)	RSS Fortitude	20	31 Jan 2020	1,250 tonnes	
Independence class	8	Singapore		Littoral mission vessel	ST Engineering (Marine)	RSS Dauntless	21	31 Jan 2020	1,250 tonnes	
Independence class	8	Singapore		Littoral mission vessel	ST Engineering (Marine)	RSS Fearless	22	31 Jan 2020	1,250 tonnes	
Sentinel class Former Fearless class	4	Singapore		Maritime security and response vessels	ST Engineering (Marine)	MSRV Sentinel	55	26 Jan 2021	525 tonnes	Refurbished ships.
Sentinel class Former Fearless class	4	Singapore		Maritime security and response vessels	ST Engineering (Marine)	MSRV Guardian	56	26 Jan 2021	525 tonnes	Refurbished ships.
Sentinel class Former Fearless class	4	Singapore		Maritime security and response vessels	ST Engineering (Marine)	MSRV Protector	57	20 Jan 2022	525 tonnes	Refurbished ships.
Sentinel class Former Fearless class	4	Singapore		Maritime security and response vessels	ST Engineering (Marine)	MSRV Bastion	58	20 Jan 2022	525 tonnes	Refurbished ships.
Mine warfare ships (4)
Bedok class Derived from Landsort class	4	Sweden; Singapore		Mine countermeasures vessel	Kockums (design); ST Engineering (Marine) (assembly)	RSS Bedok	M105	7 Oct 1995	360 tonnes	
Bedok class Derived from Landsort class	4	Sweden; Singapore		Mine countermeasures vessel	Kockums (design); ST Engineering (Marine) (assembly)	RSS Kallang	M106	7 Oct 1995	360 tonnes	
Bedok class Derived from Landsort class	4	Sweden; Singapore		Mine countermeasures vessel	Kockums (design); ST Engineering (Marine) (assembly)	RSS Katong	M107	7 Oct 1995	360 tonnes	
Bedok class Derived from Landsort class	4	Sweden; Singapore		Mine countermeasures vessel	Kockums (design); ST Engineering (Marine) (assembly)	RSS Punggol	M107	7 Oct 1995	360 tonnes	
Amphibious warfare (4)
Endurance class	4	Singapore		Landing platform dock	ST Engineering (Marine)	RSS Endurance	207	18 Mar 2000	6,000 tonnes	
Endurance class	4	Singapore		Landing platform dock	ST Engineering (Marine)	RSS Resolution	208	18 Mar 2000	6,000 tonnes	
Endurance class	4	Singapore		Landing platform dock	ST Engineering (Marine)	RSS Persistence	209	7 Apr 2001	6,000 tonnes	
Endurance class	4	Singapore		Landing platform dock	ST Engineering (Marine)	RSS Endeavour	210	7 Apr 2001	6,000 tonnes	
Special operations craft (–)
CCL class	N/A	Singapore	–	Special operations craft	ST Engineering (Marine)	–	–	2023	–	Operated by the Naval Diving Unit (NDU), used for underwater EOD, counter-terrorism, other special forces missions.
SMC class "Specialised Marine Craft"	3	Singapore	–	Stealth semi-submersible boat	ST Engineering (Marine)	–	–	Around 2010	40 tonnes	Used for coastal interception and maritime security.
SMC II class "Specialised Marine Craft Type II"	5	Singapore	–	Stealth semi-submersible boat	ST Engineering (Marine)	–	–	Around 2015	45 tonnes	Used for coastal interception and maritime security.
Halmatic FIC 145 class "Fast Interceptor Craft 145", derived from Fabio Buzzi FB Mil-50P	Unknown	Italy (design); United Kingdom (built)	–	Fast military assault craft	Halmatic	–	–	–	–	
CCM; Zodiac Milpro ZH-1100 MACH II	Unknown	France	–	RHIB	Zodiac Milpro	–	–	–	–	
CCU class "Combatant Craft Underwater", JFD Carrier Seal	Unknown	United Kingdom		Swimmer delivery vehicle	James Fisher Defence Global	–	–	–	4.3 tonnes	
Unmanned vessels (–)
Venus 16 USV	Unknown	Singapore	–	Unmanned surface vessel	ST Engineering (Marine)	–	–	–	26 tonnes	
Protector USV	Unknown	Israel		Unmanned surface vessel RHIB (rigid hull inflatable boat)	Rafael Advanced Defense Systems	–	–	2004	–	
Spartan Scout	2	United States	–	Unmanned surface vessel RHIB (rigid hull inflatable boat)	–	–	–	–	–	Used for research and development.
Vigilant USV	Unknown	United States	–	Unmanned surface vessel	Zyvex Marine	–	–	–	–	

=== Auxiliary fleet ===
Class	In service	Origin	Picture	Type	Builder	Ship	Comm.	Disp.	Notes
Training vessel (1)
Point class	1	United Kingdom; Germany	–	Training vessel	Houlder Ltd (design); FSG Shipyard (shipbuilding)	MV Mentor	16 May 2024	14,200 tonnes	Leased to the Republic of Singapore Navy on a commercial agreement.
Rescue vessels (1 + 1 robot)
MV Swift Rescue	1	Singapore		Submarine support and rescue vessel	ST Engineering (Marine)	MV Swift Rescue	30 Apr 2009	4,290 tonnes	
DSAR 500 "Deep Search and Rescue 500"	1	United Kingdom	–	Underwater search and rescue vessel	James Fisher Defence	DSAR 6	30 Apr 2009	–	

== Future fleet ==
=== On order ===
Class	On order	Origin	Picture	Type	Builder	Ship	No.	Planned Comm.	Status	Disp. / length	Notes
Submarines (4)
Invincible class Type 218SG	2	Germany		Attack submarine	TKMS	–	–	–	–	2,200 tonnes (submerged); 2,000 tonnes (surfaced)	
Invincible class Type 218SG	2	Germany		Attack submarine	TKMS	–	–	–	–	2,200 tonnes (submerged); 2,000 tonnes (surfaced)	
Multi-role ships (6)
Victory class Derived from the Iver Huitfeldt and Absalon-class frigates	6	Denmark; Singapore; Sweden		Drone mothership / Frigate	Odense Maritime Technology (OMT) (design); ST Engineering Marine (builder and systems); Saab Kockums (design and systems)	Victory	88	2028	Construction	8,400 tonnes	Successor of the 6 Victory class missile corvettes. Ships in class of the MRCV will take on the names of the 6 Victory-class missile corvettes.
Victory class Derived from the Iver Huitfeldt and Absalon-class frigates	6	Denmark; Singapore; Sweden		Drone mothership / Frigate	Odense Maritime Technology (OMT) (design); ST Engineering Marine (builder and systems); Saab Kockums (design and systems)	Valour	89	Beyond 2028	Construction	8,400 tonnes	Successor of the 6 Victory class missile corvettes. Ships in class of the MRCV will take on the names of the 6 Victory-class missile corvettes.
Victory class Derived from the Iver Huitfeldt and Absalon-class frigates	6	Denmark; Singapore; Sweden		Drone mothership / Frigate	Odense Maritime Technology (OMT) (design); ST Engineering Marine (builder and systems); Saab Kockums (design and systems)	Vigilance	90	Beyond 2028	Construction	8,400 tonnes	Successor of the 6 Victory class missile corvettes. Ships in class of the MRCV will take on the names of the 6 Victory-class missile corvettes.
Victory class Derived from the Iver Huitfeldt and Absalon-class frigates	6	Denmark; Singapore; Sweden		Drone mothership / Frigate	Odense Maritime Technology (OMT) (design); ST Engineering Marine (builder and systems); Saab Kockums (design and systems)	Valiant	91	Beyond 2028	Construction	8,400 tonnes	Successor of the 6 Victory class missile corvettes. Ships in class of the MRCV will take on the names of the 6 Victory-class missile corvettes.
Victory class Derived from the Iver Huitfeldt and Absalon-class frigates	6	Denmark; Singapore; Sweden		Drone mothership / Frigate	Odense Maritime Technology (OMT) (design); ST Engineering Marine (builder and systems); Saab Kockums (design and systems)	Vigour	92	Beyond 2028	Under contract	8,400 tonnes	Successor of the 6 Victory class missile corvettes. Ships in class of the MRCV will take on the names of the 6 Victory-class missile corvettes.
Victory class Derived from the Iver Huitfeldt and Absalon-class frigates	6	Denmark; Singapore; Sweden		Drone mothership / Frigate	Odense Maritime Technology (OMT) (design); ST Engineering Marine (builder and systems); Saab Kockums (design and systems)	Vengeance	93	Beyond 2028	Under contract	8,400 tonnes	Successor of the 6 Victory class missile corvettes. Ships in class of the MRCV will take on the names of the 6 Victory-class missile corvettes.
Patrol vessels (4)
Sentinel class Derived from the German Federal Police's (Bundespolizei) Potsdam-class offshore patrol vessel (OPV 86)	4	Germany (design); Lithuania (hull)	–	Patrol vessel	Fassmer, Western Baltija Shipbuilding	Sentinel	26	2028	Construction	2,700 tonnes	Successor of the 4 Sentinel-class MSRV
Sentinel class Derived from the German Federal Police's (Bundespolizei) Potsdam-class offshore patrol vessel (OPV 86)	4	Germany (design); Lithuania (hull)	–	Patrol vessel	Fassmer, Western Baltija Shipbuilding	Guardian	27		Construction	2,700 tonnes	Successor of the 4 Sentinel-class MSRV
Sentinel class Derived from the German Federal Police's (Bundespolizei) Potsdam-class offshore patrol vessel (OPV 86)	4	Germany (design); Lithuania (hull)	–	Patrol vessel	Fassmer, Western Baltija Shipbuilding	Protector	28		Construction	2,700 tonnes	Successor of the 4 Sentinel-class MSRV
Sentinel class Derived from the German Federal Police's (Bundespolizei) Potsdam-class offshore patrol vessel (OPV 86)	4	Germany (design); Lithuania (hull)	–	Patrol vessel	Fassmer, Western Baltija Shipbuilding	Bastion	29		Construction	2,700 tonnes	Successor of the 4 Sentinel-class MSRV

== Decommissioned ships ==
=== Challenger class submarine (Sjöormen-class) ===
- RSS Challenger
- RSS Centurion
- RSS Conqueror
- RSS Chieftain

=== Fearless-class patrol vessel ===
- RSS Resilience (82)
- RSS Unity (83)
- RSS Sovereignty (84)
- RSS Justice (85)
- RSS Freedom (86)
- RSS Independence (87)
- RSS Fearless (94)
- RSS Brave (95)
- RSS Courageous (96)
- RSS Gallant (97)
- RSS Daring (98)
- RSS Dauntless (99)

=== Sea Wolf-class missile gunboat ===
- RSS Sea Wolf (P76)
- RSS Sea Lion (P77)
- RSS Sea Dragon (P78)
- RSS Sea Tiger (P79)
- RSS Sea Hawk (P80)
- RSS Sea Scorpion (P81)

=== Independence-class patrol craft ===
- RSS Independence
- RSS Freedom
- RSS Justice
- RSS Sovereignty
- RSS Daring
- RSS Dauntless

=== Swift-class coastal patrol craft ===
- RSS Swift Knight (P11)
- RSS Swift Lancer (P12)
- RSS Swift Swordsman (P14)
- RSS Swift Warrior (P15)
- RSS Swift Archer (P16)
- RSS Swift Warlord (P17)
- RSS Swift Combatant (P18)
- RSS Swift Challenger (P19)
- RSS Swift Cavalier (P20)
- RSS Swift Conqueror (P21)
- RSS Swift Centurion (P22)
- RSS Swift Chieftain (P23)

=== County-class landing ship tank ===
- RSS Endurance (L201)
- RSS Excellence (L202)
- RSS Intrepid (L203)
- RSS Resolution (L204)
- RSS Persistence (L205)

=== Sir Lancelot-class landing ship logistic ===
- RSS Perseverance (L206)

=== Bluebird-class minesweeper ===
- RSS Jupiter (M101)
- RSS Mercury (M102)

=== Singapore Naval Volunteer Force (Straits Settlement Royal Volunteer Naval Reserves) ===
- RSS Panglima
  - 75' motor launch built in Singapore by Thornycroft in 1937 and sunk in 1942
  - 90' motorized fishing vessel built in England for RN c. 1944 and delivered 1948. Retired as wooden hull rotting out.
  - 117' built by United Engineering Limited of Singapore c. 1956; P68 retired in 1991.
- RSS Bedok - Police patrol craft taken over by SNV in 1966
- RSS Singapura
