= RSS Victory =

Two ships of the Republic of Singapore Navy have borne the name RSS Victory.

- RSS Victory (1988) - launched in 1988 as the first-of-class of the Victory-class missile corvettes and commissioned in 1990.
- RSS Victory (2025) - launched in 2025 as the first-of-class of the Victory-class multi-role combat vessels and due for commissioning in 2028.
