= RSS Valour =

Two ships of the Republic of Singapore Navy have borne the name RSS Valour.

- RSS Valour (1988) - launched in 1988 as the second ship of the Victory-class missile corvettes and commissioned in 1990.
- RSS Valour (2026) - launched in 2026 as the second ship of the Victory-class multi-role combat vessels and due for commissioning in 2029.
