= USS Holmes County =

US Navy tank landing ship during World War II

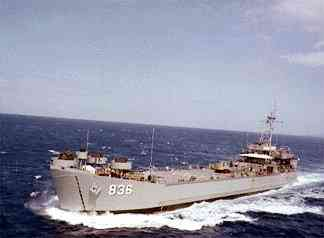
- USS Holmes County underway in 1960s.

History

United States
- Name: LST-836
- Builder: American Bridge Company, Ambridge, Pennsylvania
- Laid down: 11 September 1944
- Launched: 29 October 1944
- Commissioned: 25 November 1944
- Decommissioned: 25 July 1946
- Recommissioned: 3 November 1950
- Decommissioned: 1 July 1971
- Renamed: Holmes County, 1 July 1955
- Fate: Sold to Republic of Singapore Navy, 5 December 1975

Singapore
- Name: Endurance
- Namesake: Endurance
- Acquired: 5 December 1975
- Commissioned: 1 July 1971 (on loan)
- Decommissioned: 1999
- Home port: Changi Naval Base, Singapore
- Identification: L-201
- Fate: Serving as a floating sea-defense barricade at Changi Naval Base
- Status: Decommissioned

General characteristics
- Class & type: LST-542-class tank landing ship
- Displacement: 1,625 long tons (1,651 t) (light); 4,080 long tons (4,145 t) (full (seagoing draft with 1,675 short tons (1,520 t) load); 2,366 long tons (2,404 t) (beaching)
- Length: 328 ft (100 m) oa
- Beam: 50 ft (15 m)
- Draft: Unloaded: 2 ft 4 in (0.71 m) forward; 7 ft 6 in (2.29 m) aft; Full load: 8 ft 3 in (2.51 m) forward; 14 ft 1 in (4.29 m) aft; Landing with 500 short tons (450 t) load: 3 ft 11 in (1.19 m) forward; 9 ft 10 in (3.00 m) aft; Limiting 11 ft 2 in (3.40 m); Maximum navigation 14 ft 1 in (4.29 m)
- Installed power: 2 × 900 hp (670 kW) Electro-Motive Diesel 12-567A diesel engines; 1,800 shp (1,300 kW)
- Propulsion: 1 × Falk main reduction gears; 2 × Propellers
- Speed: 11.6 kn (21.5 km/h; 13.3 mph)
- Range: 24,000 nmi (44,000 km; 28,000 mi) at 9 kn (17 km/h; 10 mph) while displacing 3,960 long tons (4,024 t)
- Boats & landing craft carried: 2 x LCVPs
- Capacity: 1,600–1,900 short tons (3,200,000–3,800,000 lb; 1,500,000–1,700,000 kg) cargo depending on mission
- Troops: 16 officers, 147 enlisted men
- Complement: 13 officers, 104 enlisted men
- Armament: Varied, ultimate armament; 2 × twin 40 mm (1.57 in) Bofors guns; 4 × single 40 mm Bofors guns; 12 × 20 mm (0.79 in) Oerlikon cannons
- Aviation facilities: Deck as helipad

USS Holmes County (LST-836) was an LST-542-class tank landing ship built for the United States Navy during World War II. Named after counties in Florida, Mississippi, and Ohio, she was the only U.S. Naval vessel to bear the name.

== Construction ==
Laid down as LST-836 by the American Bridge Company of Ambridge, Pennsylvania, on 11 September 1944; launched on 29 October; sponsored by Mrs. H. E. Hetu; and commissioned on 25 November.

== Service in United States Navy ==
=== 1940s ===
After shakedown off Florida, LST-836 loaded ammunition, lumber, and cement, then departed New Orleans, on 2 January 1945. She unloaded the cargo at Balboa, Panama, in the Canal Zone, and proceeded to San Diego, arriving on 23 January. In early February she sailed for Hawaii, where she trained, embarked troops, then steamed to the Marshall Islands. Following three weeks of preparation in the Marshalls and Carolines, the landing ship departed Ulithi, on 12 April, for Okinawa. With the battle for this strategic base well underway, LST-836 arrived six days later; unloaded troops and equipment and returned Ulithi, on 29 April.

For the rest of the war, she shuttled cargo and troops throughout the Pacific; then after VJ Day was assigned to duty with the occupation forces in Japan. Returning to the United States, LST-836 arrived San Francisco, on 19 January 1946; and remained on the West Coast until she decommissioned at Vancouver, Washington, on 25 July 1946.

=== 1950s ===
Following four years in the Pacific Reserve Fleet, LST-836 recommissioned at Bremerton, Washington, on 3 November 1950. After refresher training she sailed for the Far East, to join United Nations forces in South Korea. Arriving at Yokosuka, on 28 March 1951, the veteran landing ship was once again assigned to a battle zone and for the next eight months shuttled cargo and troops between Japan and various Korean ports.

After a brief stateside overhaul in early 1952, LST-836 departed San Diego, on 24 July, for operations in conjunction with the first hydrogen bomb tests in the Marshall Islands. From August to November, she aided scientists as they tested this new source of power. She returned to San Diego; then, after a brief respite, sailed on 16 March 1953, for further duty in the still raging Korean War. Arriving at Yokosuka, on 22 April, LST-836 immediately commenced cargo runs from the staging areas to Inchon. When the fighting ended, LST-836 remained in the Far East to transport cargo to the United Nations peacekeeping force stationed in Korea.

From 1954 to 1959, she made three WestPac cruises and participated in training operations along the West Coast. On 1 July 1955, LST-836 was renamed Holmes County. Following a FRAM overhaul in late 1959, the landing ship was assigned to the Pacific Amphibious Force, and for the next five years Holmes County engaged in amphibious exercises along the West Coast and in the Hawaiian Islands.

=== 1960s-1970s ===
On 11 October 1965, Holmes County left San Diego, for operations in Southeast Asia. She arrived at Da Nang, South Vietnam, on 22 November, and operated there for the rest of the year and into 1966. On 29 March 1966, after 89 days in the combat zone, Holmes County steamed for Yokosuka, for upkeep before starting the 5,500-nautical-mile (10,200 km; 6,300 mi) journey home. Holmes County received the following message from Commander 7th Fleet: "As you depart 7th Fleet Intra-Coastal Task Unit, be assured you leave behind an admiration for the extraordinary work you have done this cruise." On 26 May, Holmes County arrived home. After serving in the San Diego area for four months, she participated in the Fleet Exercise "Operation Base Line" in October. This was one of the largest peacetime operations conducted by the Pacific Fleet.

Holmes County later returned to Vietnam, operating in that theatre until 1971.

== Service in Republic of Singapore Navy ==
=== 1970s-1980s ===
Holmes County was transferred on loan to the Republic of Singapore Navy (RSN) on 1 July in 1971, being renamed as RSS Endurance (L201). The ship was eventually sold outright to Singapore on 5 December in 1975. Endurance, along with four other ex-US Navy LSTs sold to Singapore by the US at around the same period of time, served as part of the RSN's 191 Squadron of the 3rd Flotilla, with its main roles being transporting Singapore Army troops and personnel to training facilities abroad (in foreign countries such as Taiwan), rescue-and-aid operations, supply missions as well as for officer-cadet training programmes conducted overseas. Endurance was re-engined with MTU diesel-powered ship-engines during her service with the Singapore Navy.

=== 1990s-2000s ===
Following the commissioning of the new Endurance (LS207) into the Singapore Navy in 1999, she was decommissioned from active service for the last time in that same year, along with her sister ships, Excellence (L202; formerly LST-629), Intrepid (L203; formerly LST-579), Resolution (L204; formerly LST-649) and Persistence (L205; formerly LST-613). Currently, with the exception of Resolution, which is now moored at Tuas Naval Base for use as a training ship, all four ex-US Navy LSTs are employed as floating sea-defense barricades for Changi Naval Base.

== Awards and honors ==
- Combat Action Ribbon
- Navy Unit Commendation (2 awards)
- American Campaign Medal
- Asiatic-Pacific Campaign Medal (1 award)
- World War II Victory Medal
- Navy Occupation Service Medal with "Asia" clasp
- National Defense Service Medal (2 awards)
- Korean Service Medal (3 awards)
- Vietnam Service Medal (11 awards)
- Republic of Vietnam Gallantry Cross Unit Citation (5 awards)
- Republic of Vietnam Civil Actions Unit Citation
- United Nations Service Medal
- Republic of Vietnam Campaign Medal
- Republic of Korea War Service Medal (retroactive)

== Bibliography ==
- "LST-836". Dictionary of American Naval Fighting Ships. Naval History and Heritage Command.
- "Holmes County". Dictionary of American Naval Fighting Ships. Naval History and Heritage Command. 20 July 2015.
- "USS Holmes County (LST-836)". NavSource. 24 January 2020.
- Moore, John (1985). Jane's Fighting Ships 1985–86. London: Jane's Yearbooks. ISBN 0-7106-0814-4.
- Baker, A. D. (1998). The Naval Institute Guide to Combat Fleets of the World 1998–1999. Annapolis, Maryland: Naval Institute Press. ISBN 1-55750-111-4.
- Wertheim, Eric (30 March 2007). Naval Institute Guide to Combat Fleets of the World: Their Ships, Aircraft, and Systems (15th ed.). Annapolis, Maryland: Naval Institute Press. ISBN 978-1-59114-955-2.
