= P78 =

P78 or P-78 may refer to:

- FB P-78, a pistol
- HMS Voracious (P78), a submarine of the Royal Navy
- INS Kadmatt (P78), a corvette of the Indian Navy
- North American XP-78, a variant of the North American P-51 Mustang
- P78 road (Ukraine)
- Papyrus 78, a biblical manuscript
- Solwind, a NASA space probe
- P78, a state regional road in Latvia
- HS Karathanasis (P 78), a Roussen-class fast attack craft of the Hellenic Navy
- RSS Sea Dragon (P78), a missile gunboat of the Republic of Singapore Navy
