= Endurance (disambiguation) =

Endurance (or stamina) is the act of sustaining prolonged stressful effort.

Endurance may also refer to:

== Entertainment and media ==
- Endurance (TV series), an American Survivor-style reality TV show for teens
- Endurance (Japanese TV series), a 1980s Japanese TV game show for students
- Endurance: A Year in Space, a Lifetime of Discovery, a 2017 memoir by Scott Kelly
- Endurance: Shackleton's Incredible Voyage, a 1959 book written by Alfred Lansing about the Imperial Trans-Antarctic Expedition
- The Endurance: Shackleton's Legendary Antarctic Expedition, a 2000 documentary film about the Imperial Trans-Antarctic Expedition
- Endurance (film), a 1999 film directed by Leslie Woodhead and Bud Greenspan
- Jacques Jams Vol 1: Endurance, a mixtape by the band Chester French

== Vehicles ==
- ENDURANCE, NASA's Environmentally Non-Disturbing Under-ice Robotic ANtarctiC Explorer
- Endurance (1912 ship), Ernest Shackleton's Antarctica vessel
- HMS Endurance (1967), a British Royal Navy ice patrol vessel which played a part in the Falklands War
- HMS Endurance (A171), a 1991 Royal Navy Antarctic-class 1A1 icebreaker
- RSS Endurance, either of two ships of the Singapore Navy
- Lordstown Endurance, a battery-electric pickup truck
- Crew Dragon Endurance (Dragon C210), a spacecraft built under NASA's Commercial Crew Program
- Wright Endurance, a right-hand drive bus built on Volvo B10B and Scania N113CRL chassis

=== Fictional vehicles ===
- Endurance, a NASA starship in the 2014 film Interstellar
- Endurance (Star Wars), a fleet carrier in the Star Wars universe

== Other uses ==
- Endurance riding, a horse sport
- Endurance (aeronautics), the maximum length of time an aircraft can stay in flight
- Endurance (crater), a Martian landmark visited by the rover Opportunity
- Endurance (philosophy), a philosophical theory of persistence and identity
- Combat endurance

== See also ==
- Endurance race (disambiguation)
- Endurance International Group, a web hosting company
