= Sentinel-class patrol vessel =

Class of ships

Class overview
- Name: Sentinel-class
- Builders: Development: Fassmer; Builder: Western Baltic Shipyard
- Operators: Republic of Singapore Navy
- Preceded by: Sentinel-class maritime security and response vessels
- Built: 2024–present
- Building: 4

General characteristics
- Type: Offshore patrol vessel
- Displacement: 2,700 tonnes (2,660 long tons; 2,980 short tons)
- Length: 94.85 m (311 ft 2 in)
- Beam: 15.2 m (49 ft 10 in)
- Propulsion: Combined diesel-electric or diesel (CODLOD)
- Speed: In excess of 23 knots (42.6 km/h; 26.5 mph)
- Range: >4,000 nautical miles (7,410 km)
- Complement: 40
- Sensors & processing systems: Radars: Terma navigation radar; Saab radar; Thales fire control radar; E/O sensors: Safran EO; Seadronix navigation cameras
- Armament: Guns: 1 × STRALES 76mm Guided Gun; 2 × RAFAEL 30mm remotely-controlled weapon system; Non-kinetic: Sitep Italia laser dazzler and multirole acoustic stabilized system; Less lethal grenade launcher; Water cannons
- Aviation facilities: Helicopter deck
- Notes: Sources:

The Sentinel-class offshore patrol vessel (OPV) is a class of four ships being constructed for the Republic of Singapore Navy (RSN), which will succeed the Sentinel-class maritime security and response vessels. The OPVs are scheduled to be delivered progressively to the RSN from 2028. German firm Fassmer will develop the class, while Western Baltic Shipyard will build the ships, before Fassmer commences the fitting out process.

== Planning and acquisition ==
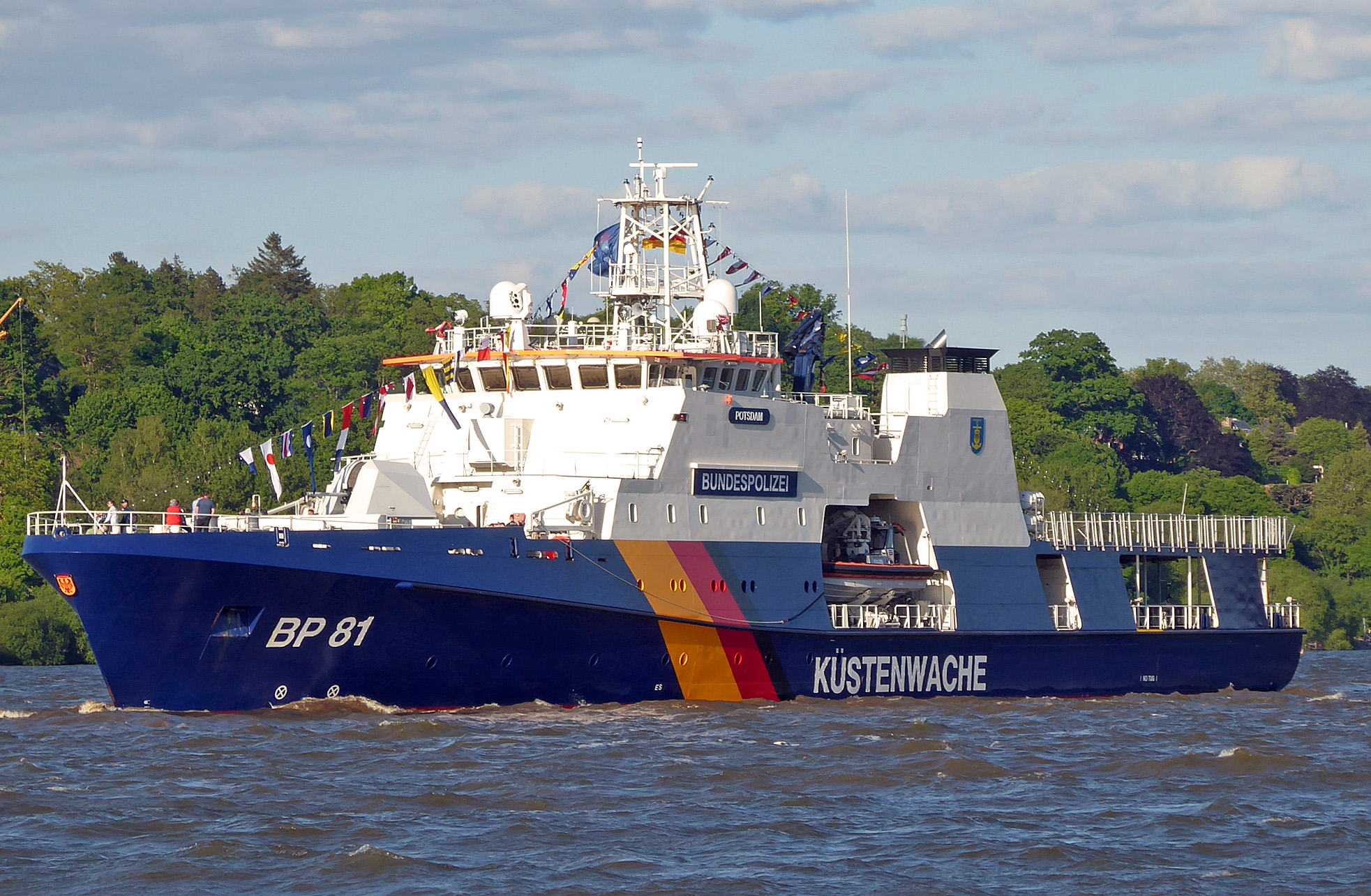
The OPV design will be based on the Potsdam-class operated by Germany.

The Republic of Singapore Navy began operating the Fearless-class patrol vessel in 1996, eventually decommissioning the final units in December 2020. In response to a spike in piracy within the Singapore Strait, it was announced in March 2020 that new purpose-built vessels would be acquired. As an interim measure, four Fearless-class were refurbished and recommissioned as Sentinel-class maritime security and response vessels (MSRV), with two units entering service in 2021 and the remaining two in 2022.

As of 2021, the new class was in the early design phase to replace the MSRVs. ST Engineering, Luerssen, and Fassmer were the bidders for the contract for the new class of offshore patrol vessels. The Ministry of Defence (MINDEF) announced the signing of a contract with Fassmer on 20 November 2023 for the purchase of four ships. Fassmer will develop the new class based on the existing OPV 80 Potsdam-class design serving in the German Federal Coast Guard.

The ships are being built by Western Baltic Shipyard in Klaipėda, Lithuania, and will be fitted out by Fassmer in Berne, Germany. The class is planned for phased delivery from 2028 onwards.

== Design and construction ==
The steel cutting ceremony of all four ships was held in the Western Baltic Shipyard on 11 October 2024. Subsequently, the first two ships had their keels laid on 7 April 2025. The first-of-class was launched on 1 October 2026 in Berne, Germany, and christened Sentinel.

== Capabilities ==
MINDEF intends for the Sentinel-class to carry out maritime security operations within Singapore territorial waters. They are painted white with red racing stripes similar to other maritime security vessels worldwide, and will fly the state marine ensign designating them as a government-owned/operated vessel.

The class is equipped with a combined diesel electric or diesel propulsion system, which optimizes fuel consumption when switching between routine patrols and rapid response. Ballistic protection is installed in critical operational areas. Different mission containers can be installed depending on mission requirements. A launch and recovery system for small boats is located at the stern. Fenders are installed on the hull to protect the ship during alongside operations with other vessels.

=== Armaments ===
The main gun of the class is the STRALES 76mm Guided Gun, developed by Leonardo, and the secondary gun armament is the RAFAEL 30mm remotely-controlled weapon system. Water cannons and a less lethal grenade launcher are also installed to allow for proportional responses to lower level threats.

=== Sensors ===
Italian firm Sitep Italia will provide the multirole acoustic stabilized system as part of the OPV's non-lethal suite.

== Ships in class ==
The ships will adopt the names of the Sentinel-class maritime security and response vessels.

Ship	Pennant number	Steel cut	Keel laid	Launched	Commissioned	Status
Sentinel	26	11 Oct 2024	7 Apr 2025	1 Oct 2026		Sea trials / Fitting out
Guardian	27	11 Oct 2024	7 Apr 2025			Under construction
Protector	28	11 Oct 2024				Under construction
Bastion	29	11 Oct 2024				Under construction

== See also ==
- List of ships of the Republic of Singapore Navy
