= RSS Victory (2025) =

Victory-class multi-role combat vessel of Singapore Navy

History

Singapore
- Name: Victory
- Namesake: RSS Victory (1988)
- Ordered: 2023
- Builder: ST Engineering Marine Ltd
- Laid down: 22 October 2024
- Launched: 21 October 2025
- Identification: Pennant number: 88
- Status: Fitting out

General characteristics
- Type: Frigate
- Displacement: 8,000 tonnes (7,870 long tons; 8,820 short tons)
- Length: 150 m (492 ft 2 in)
- Beam: 21.04 m (69 ft 0 in)
- Draught: 5.7 m (18 ft 8 in)
- Speed: Up to 24 knots (44.4 km/h; 27.6 mph)
- Range: >7,000 nautical miles (13,000 km)
- Complement: <100
- Sensors & processing systems: Navigation radar: To be confirmed; Search radar: Thales Sea Fire Multi-Function Radar; Fire-control radar: Thales Fire Control Radar; Anti-air radar: Thales Sea Fire Multi-Function Radar; EO: Safran electro-optical System; Sonar: Hull-mounted sonar
- Armament: Anti-ship: To be confirmed; Anti-air: 32-cell Vertical Launch System firing: VL MICA NG; Aster 30 B1 NT; Anti-submarine: To be confirmed; Guns: STRALES 76mm Guided Gun, Mk-30c 30mm Remotely-Controlled Weapon System; Non-lethal: To be confirmed
- Aviation facilities: Flight deck and hangar
- Notes: Sources:

RSS Victory (88) is the future lead ship of the Victory-class multi-role combat vessels of the Republic of Singapore Navy (RSN). She will have the same name and pennant number as her predecessor, RSS Victory, a missile corvette launched in 1988, upon the latter's decommissioning. She is planned to be delivered to the RSN in 2028.

== Construction ==
Her keel was laid in ST Marine's Benoi Yard on 22 October 2024 in a ceremony officiated by Permanent Secretary (Defence Development) Melvyn Ong. Ong and Chief of Navy Rear Admiral Sean Wat then partook in the traditional coin ceremony. Representatives of ST Marine, the Defence Science and Technology Agency, RSN midshipmen and the 8th Flotilla were present.

Victory was named and launched at Benoi Yard on 21 October 2025 by the spouse of Defence Minister Chan Chun Sing, in a ceremony officiated by the minister. Gul Yard will then take over Victory's fitting out and sea trials.
