= BLRT Grupp =

Company based in Estonia

BLRT Grupp AS
- Company type: Private
- Industry: Shipbuilding; Mechanical engineering
- Predecessor: Russo-Baltic Shipbuilding Yard
- Founded: 1912
- Headquarters: Tallinn, Estonia
- Number of locations: 52 subsidiaries; 4 joint ventures
- Key people: Veronika Ivanovskaja (CEO)
- Products: Passenger ships; Ferries Fishing vessels; Cargo ships; Barges; Floating dry docks; Fish farming facilities; Drilling rigs; Cranes; Ship unloaders; Steel bridge sections; Railway tunnel sections; Technical gases
- Brands: BLRT Grupp; Marketex Marine; Marketex Offshore Constructions; Baltic Premator; Elme Messer Gaas; Elme Metall; Elme Trans
- Services: Engineering services; Transport Services; Port Services
- Revenue: ▲€411 million (2014)
- Number of employees: 4,000 (2014)
- Subsidiaries: Tallinn Shipyard; BLRT Western Shipyard; Turku Repair Yard; BLRT Fiskerstrand
- Website: www.blrt.ee

BLRT Grupp (Balti Laevaremonditehas) is a shipbuilding company headquartered in Tallinn, Estonia. In addition to Estonia, the company owns shipyards in Lithuania, Finland and Norway. Its shipbuilding and ship repair subsidiaries are Tallinn Shipyard, BLRT Western Shipyard, Turku Repair Yard, and BLRT Fiskerstrand.

On 14 December 2011, Fiskerstrand BLRT delivered the world's largest LNG-powered ferry, MF Boknafjord, to Norwegian company Fjord1. Another LNG-fired ferry, MF Edøyfjord, was delivered on 30 January 2012.

The total profit was 283.9 million euros in 2017, 302.2 million euros in 2018. Net profit was 18.5 million euros in 2017, 15.1 million euros in 2018.
