= RSS Resolution =

Two ships of the Republic of Singapore Navy (RSN) have been named RSS Resolution. They are as following;

- RSS Resolution (L204), an LST-542-class tank landing ship in service with the RSN from 1971 to 1999.
- RSS Resolution (208), an Endurance-class landing platform dock in service since 2001
