= Turku Repair Yard =

Finnish ship repair company based in Turku, Finland

Turku Repair Yard Ltd

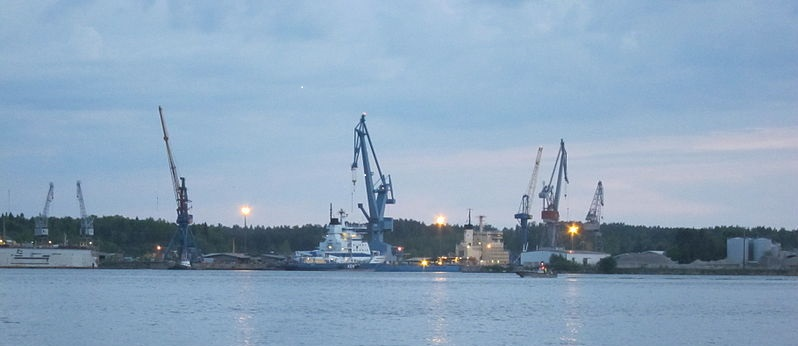
- Turku Repair Yard in May 2010.
- Native name: Finnish: Turun Korjaustelakka Oy; Swedish: Åbo Reparationsvarv Ab
- Industry: ship and boat repair and maintenance
- Predecessor: Wärtsilä Marine
- Founded: 17 November 1989; 36 years ago in Turku, Finland
- Headquarters: Naantali, Finland
- Key people: Antti Simula (CEO)
- Services: maintenance and repair of ships and boats
- Revenue: ▲€15,667,000 (2023); €14,614,000 (2022)
- Operating income: ▲€2,243,000 (2023); 1,456,000 (2022)
- Number of employees: 39 (2023); 39 (2022)
- Parent: BLRT Grupp
- Website: turkurepairyard.com/en/

Turku Repair Yard Ltd (Finnish: Turun Korjaustelakka Oy; Swedish: Åbo Reparationsvarv Ab) is a Finnish ship repair company. Its premises are situated in Luonnonmaa island, Naantali. The company has focused on repairing of ships and boats.

Turku Repair Yard is a part of Estonian BLRT Grupp.

== Premises ==
The company's premises are situated in Naantali, Finland. The dry dock is 265 metres (869 ft) long, 70 metres (230 ft) wide and 7.9 metres (26 ft) deep. The company has also a 101-metre (331 ft) long and 21.6-metre (71 ft) wide floating dock with 4000-tonne capacity and quay which is 184 metres (604 ft) long. The maximum crane capacity is 150 tonnes.

== History ==
The company origins date back to Turku shipbuilding company Crichton-Vulcan and its predecessors. Ships were traditionally hoisted up by using slipways. In 1933, in the middle of the Great Depression, the city of Turku started building a large dry dock next to Korppolaismäki with employment subsidies. The quarry work began in 1934 and the new facility opened in August 1937. The 150-metre (490 ft) long, 30-metre (98 ft) wide and 8-metre (26 ft) deep dock was large enough for all ships which sailed in the Finnish waters back then. The dock was given to be operated by Crichton-Vulcan and the first docking took place in February 1939.

Wärtsilä took over Crichton-Vulcan at the end of the 1930s and in the 1960s the yard was renamed Wärtsilä Turku Shipyard. In the 1970s Wärtsilä built an entirely new yard in Perno. The Wärtsilä shipyards in Turku were reorganised in 1984. New ships were now built only at Perno yard and the old yard by the Aura River focused entirely on ship repairs. Following the bankruptcy of Wärtsilä Marine in 1989, a new company, Turku Repair Yard Ltd, was established the same year to continue ship repair operations. In 2003 the company left the premises at the Aura River and concentrated its operations in Naantali. The history of the Naantali premises dates back to 1956, when Rainer Sjöström founded shipping and shipbuilding subcontractor Navire Oy. In 1972 the company built in Luonnonmaa island a dry dock for hull building. Navire was split up in 1981 due to financial difficulties.

The company was taken over by Estonian BLRT Grupp in 2007.

In 2017 the company announced seeking to develop ship breaking as a new line of business.

== Sources ==
- Grönros, Jarmo; Kujanen, Hannu; Priamursky, G.; Rinta-Tassi, Osmo; Saarinen, Jarmo; Teräs, Kari; Trofimov, S. (1996). Aurajoen rautakourat — Järnnävarna vid Aura Å (in Finnish and Swedish). Turku, Finland: Turun maakuntamuseo — Åbo landskapsmuseum. ISBN 951-595-020-1.
- von Knorring, Nils (1995). Aurajoen veistämöt ja telakat [Boat- and Shipyards along River Aura] (in Finnish). Espoo, Finland: Schildts Förlags Ab. ISBN 951-50-0735-6.
