= RSS Persistence =

Two ships of the Republic of Singapore Navy (RSN) have been named RSS Persistence. They are as following;

- RSS Persistence (L205), an LST-542-class tank landing ship in service with the RSN from 1971 to 1999.
- RSS Persistence (209), an Endurance-class landing platform dock in service since 2001
