= RSS Valour (2026) =

Victory-class multi-role combat vessel of Singapore Navy

History

Singapore
- Name: Valour
- Namesake: RSS Valour (1988)
- Ordered: 2023
- Builder: ST Engineering Marine Ltd
- Laid down: 27 January 2026
- Launched: 23 July 2026
- Identification: Pennant number: 89
- Status: Under construction

General characteristics
- Type: Frigate
- Displacement: 8,000 tonnes (7,870 long tons; 8,820 short tons)
- Length: 150 m (492 ft 2 in)
- Beam: 21.04 m (69 ft 0 in)
- Draught: 5.7 m (18 ft 8 in)
- Speed: Up to 24 knots (44.4 km/h; 27.6 mph)
- Range: >7,000 nautical miles (13,000 km)
- Complement: <100
- Sensors & processing systems: Navigation radar: To be confirmed; Search radar: Thales Sea Fire Multi-Function Radar; Fire-control radar: Thales Fire Control Radar; Anti-air radar: Thales Sea Fire Multi-Function Radar; EO: Safran electro-optical System; Sonar: Hull-mounted sonar
- Armament: Anti-ship: To be confirmed; Anti-air: 32-cell Vertical Launch System firing: VL MICA NG; Aster 30 B1 NT; Anti-submarine: To be confirmed; Guns: STRALES 76mm Guided Gun, Mk-30c 30mm Remotely-Controlled Weapon System; Non-lethal: To be confirmed
- Aviation facilities: Flight deck and hangar
- Notes: Sources:

RSS Valour (89) is the second of the Victory-class multi-role combat vessels of the Republic of Singapore Navy (RSN). She will have the same name and pennant number as her predecessor, RSS Valour, a missile corvette launched in 1988, upon the latter's decommissioning. She is planned to be delivered to the RSN in 2029.

== Construction ==
Her keel was laid in ST Marine's Benoi Yard on 27 January 2026. Valour was named and launched at Benoi Yard on 23 July 2026 by the spouse of Coordinating Minister for National Security and Minister for Home Affairs K Shanmugam, in a ceremony officiated by the minister. The minister referenced the closure of the Strait of Hormuz during his speech.

She is expected to be delivered to the RSN in 2029. Her first commanding officer will be Lieutenant-Colonel Timothy Low.
