= RSS Valour (1988) =

Victory-class corvette of Singapore Navy

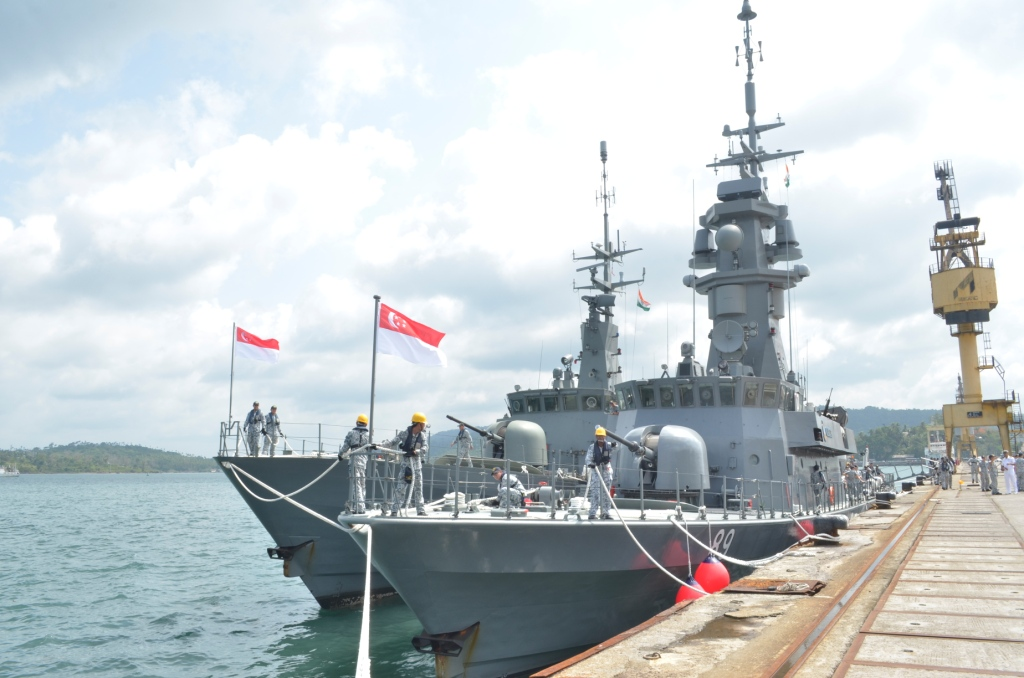
- RSS Valour and RSS Independence during SIMBEX 2014

History

Singapore
- Name: Valour
- Namesake: Valour
- Builder: ST Engineering
- Launched: 10 December 1988
- Commissioned: 18 August 1990
- Home port: Tuas
- Identification: MMSI number: 566010800; Callsign: S6KQ; Pennant number: 89
- Motto: Serve With Valour
- Status: Active

General characteristics
- Class & type: Victory-class corvette
- Displacement: 595 t (586 long tons; 656 short tons)
- Length: 62 m (203 ft 5 in)
- Beam: 8.5 m (27 ft 11 in)
- Draught: 2.6 m (8 ft 6 in)
- Propulsion: 4× Maybach MTU 16 V 538 TB93 high speed diesels coupled to 4× shafts; Total output: 16,900 hp (12,600 kW)
- Speed: Maximum: 37 knots (69 km/h; 43 mph); Cruising: 18 knots (33 km/h; 21 mph)
- Range: 4,000 nmi (7,400 km) at 18 knots (33 km/h; 21 mph)
- Complement: 49 with 8 officers
- Sensors & processing systems: Search radar: Ericsson/Radamec Sea Giraffe 150HC (G/H band) / Saab Sea Giraffe AMB post-2011 SLEP; Navigation radar: Kelvin Hughes 1007 (I band); Weapon control: Elbit MSIS optronic director; Sonar: Thomson Sintra TSM 2064 VDS
- Electronic warfare & decoys: ESM: Elisra SEWS; ECM: RAFAEL RAN 1101 Jammer; Decoys: 2× Plessey Shield 9-barrelled chaff launchers, 2× twin RAFAEL long range chaff launchers fitted below the bridge wings
- Armament: Anti-ship: 4 × Boeing Harpoon; Anti-air: 2 × 8-cell VLS for IAI/RAFAEL Barak; Anti-submarine: EuroTorp A244/S Mod 1 torpedoes launched from 2 × triple-tubes(all removed); Main gun: 1 × Oto Melara 76mm Super Rapid gun; Machine guns: 4 × STK 50MG 12.7 mm (0.50 in) HMGs
- Aircraft carried: 1× Boeing ScanEagle unmanned aerial vehicle (UAV)

RSS Valour (89) is the second ship of the Victory-class corvette of the Republic of Singapore Navy.

== Construction and career ==
Victory was launched on 10 December 1988 by ST Engineering and was commissioned on 18 August 1990.

=== Exercise Tandem Thrust 1999 ===
In 1999, RSS Valour was sent to Guam in preparation for Exercise Tandem Thrust '99.

=== SIMBEX 2014 ===
From 22 to 24 May, RSS Valour and RSS Independence participated in the SIMBEX-2014.

=== Indonesia AirAsia Flight 8501 ===
In December 2014, Persistence was deployed in the search for Airasia Flight QZ8501 after it crashed into the Java Sea on 28 December 2014; along with the RSN ships Supreme, Valour, and Kallang, MV Swift Rescue, and two Lockheed C-130H Hercules.

== Gallery ==
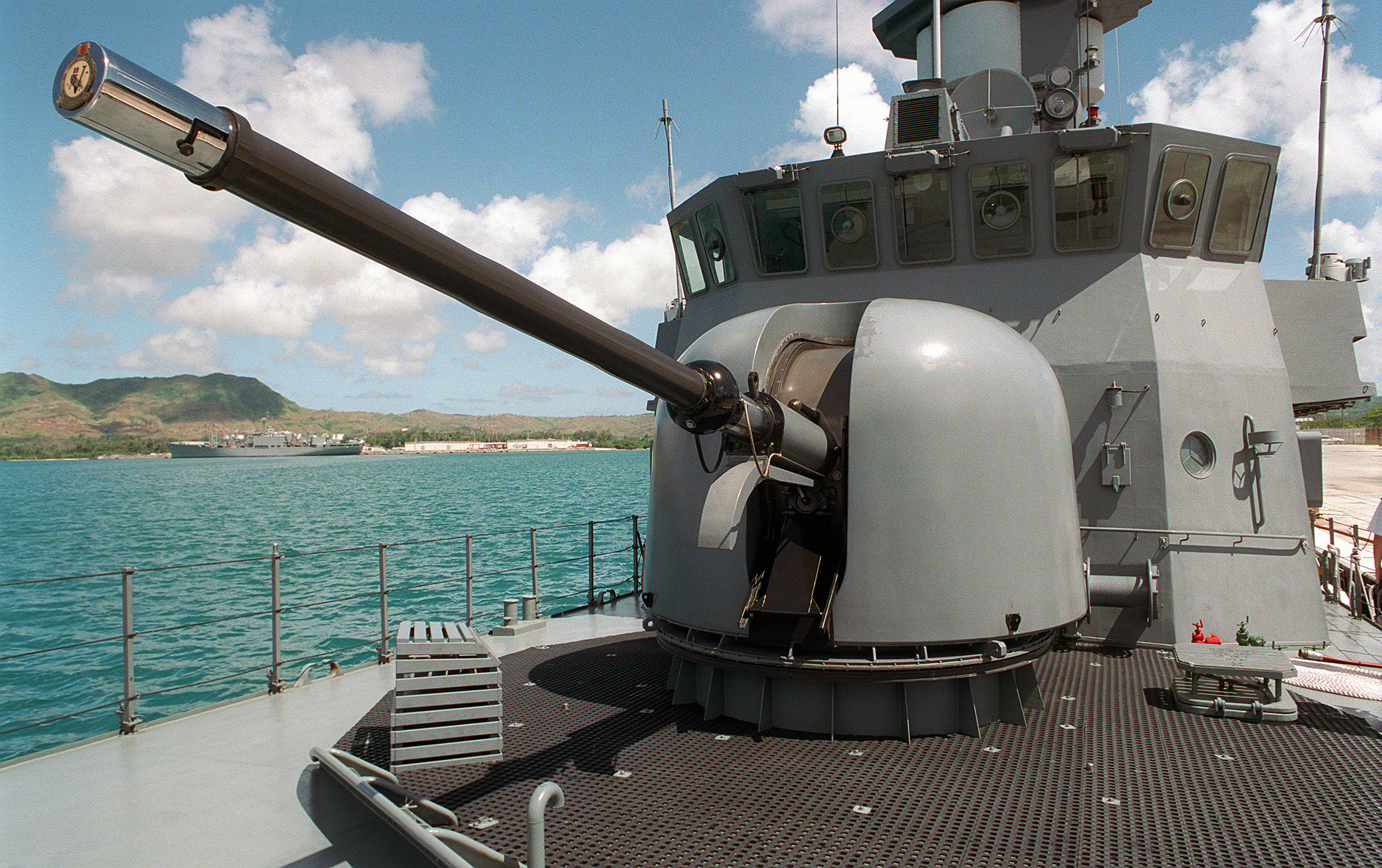
RSS Valour in Guam during Exercise Tandem Thrust 1999

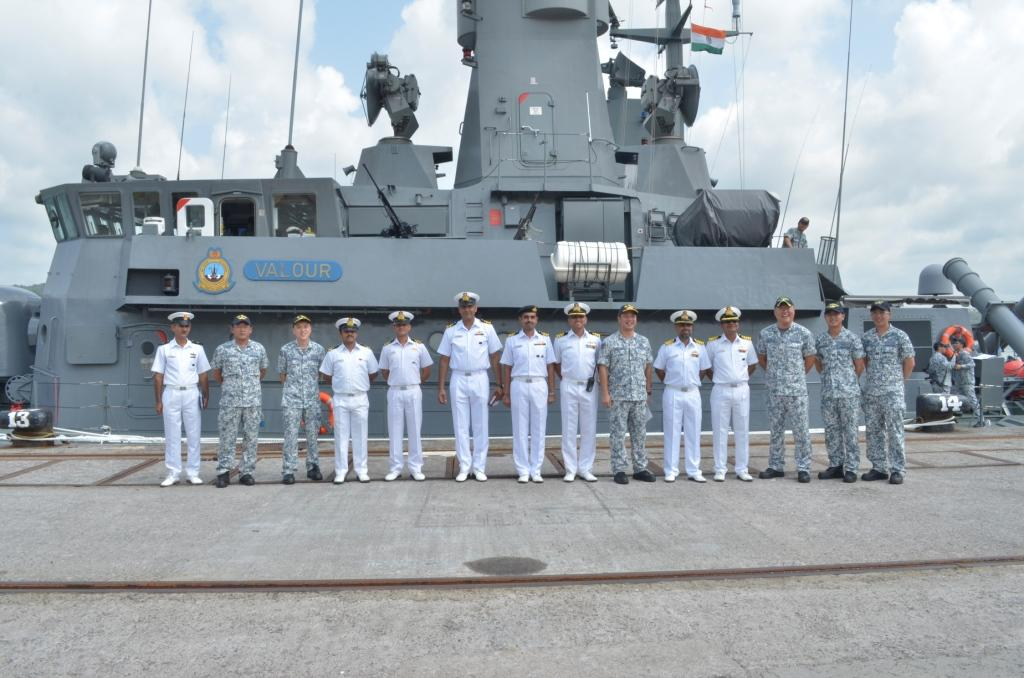
RSS Valour during SIMBEX 2014
