= RSS Vengeance =

Victory-class corvette of Singapore Navy

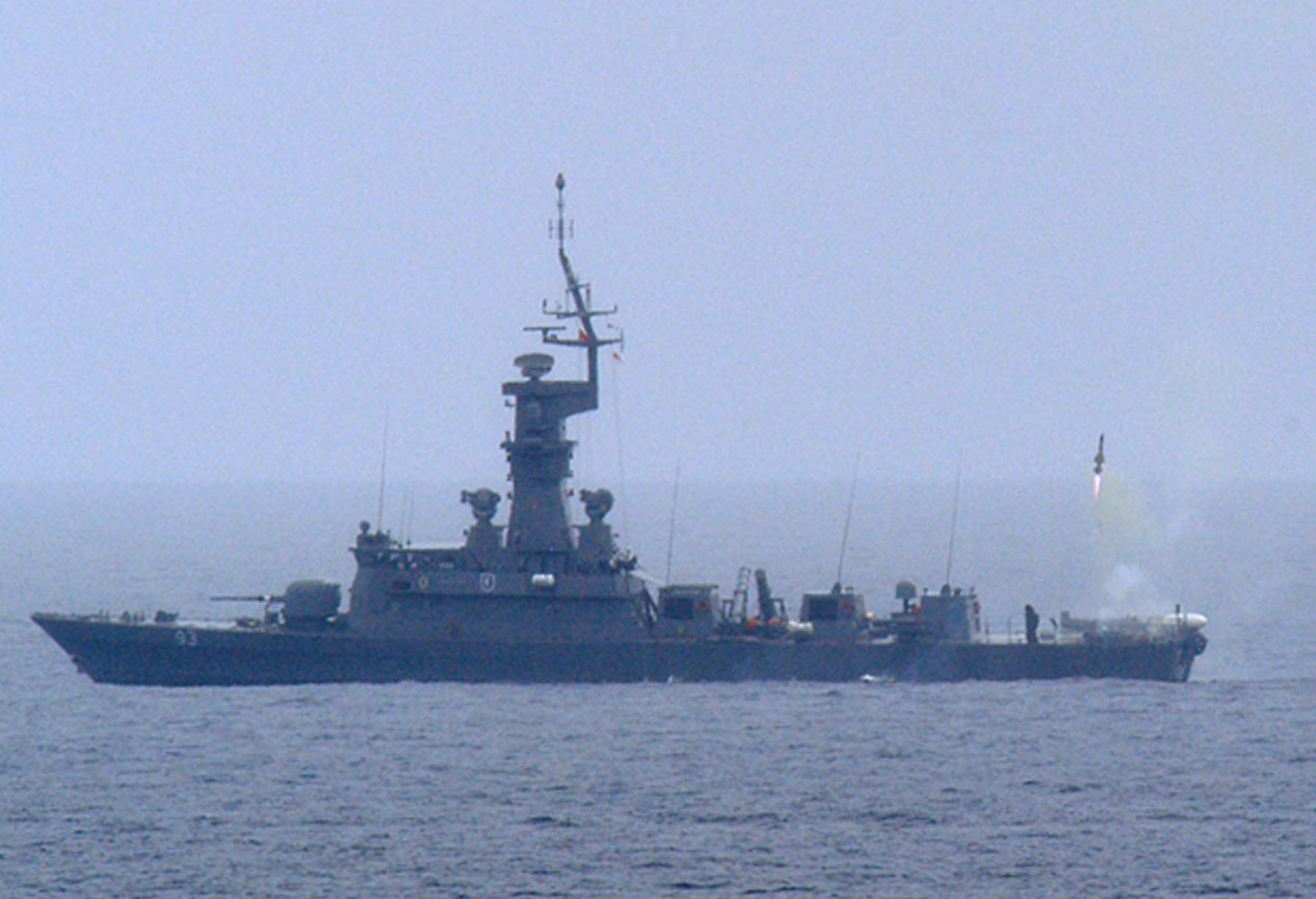
- RSS Vengeance during CARAT 2006

History

Singapore
- Name: Vengeance
- Namesake: Vengeance
- Builder: ST Engineering
- Launched: 23 December 1990
- Commissioned: 25 May 1991
- Home port: Tuas
- Identification: Pennant number: 93
- Motto: Fight For The Right
- Status: Active

General characteristics
- Class & type: Victory-class corvette
- Displacement: 595 t (586 long tons; 656 short tons)
- Length: 62 m (203 ft 5 in)
- Beam: 8.5 m (27 ft 11 in)
- Draught: 2.6 m (8 ft 6 in)
- Propulsion: 4× Maybach MTU 16 V 538 TB93 high speed diesels coupled to 4× shafts; Total output: 16,900 hp (12,600 kW)
- Speed: Maximum: 37 knots (69 km/h; 43 mph); Cruising: 18 knots (33 km/h; 21 mph)
- Range: 4,000 nmi (7,400 km) at 18 knots (33 km/h; 21 mph)
- Complement: 49 with 8 officers
- Sensors & processing systems: Search radar: Ericsson/Radamec Sea Giraffe 150HC (G/H band) / Saab Sea Giraffe AMB post-2011 SLEP; Navigation radar: Kelvin Hughes 1007 (I band); Weapon control: Elbit MSIS optronic director; Sonar: Thomson Sintra TSM 2064 VDS
- Electronic warfare & decoys: ESM: Elisra SEWS; ECM: RAFAEL RAN 1101 Jammer; Decoys: 2× Plessey Shield 9-barrelled chaff launchers, 2× twin RAFAEL long range chaff launchers fitted below the bridge wings
- Armament: Anti-ship: 4 × Boeing Harpoon; Anti-air: 2 × 8-cell VLS for IAI/RAFAEL Barak; Anti-submarine: EuroTorp A244/S Mod 1 torpedoes launched from 2 × triple-tubes(all removed); Main gun: 1 × Oto Melara 76mm Super Rapid gun; Machine guns: 4 × STK 50MG 12.7 mm (0.50 in) HMGs
- Aircraft carried: 1× Boeing ScanEagle unmanned aerial vehicle (UAV)

RSS Vengeance (93) is the sixth ship of the Victory-class corvette of the Republic of Singapore Navy.

== Construction and career ==
Vengeance was launched on 23 December 1990 by ST Engineering and was commissioned on 25 May 1991.

During Workyear 2003/2004, she was awarded Best Ship Award and Operational Excellence Award by the navy.

RSS Vengeance took part in the inaugural Exercise Bersama Padu, a joint Five Power Defence Arrangements (FPDA) exercise, in 2006.
