= RSS Endurance =

Two ships of the Republic of Singapore Navy (RSN) have been named RSS Endurance:

- The first RSS Endurance (LS201) was the former USS Holmes County, an LST-542-class tank landing ship sold to the RSN in 1975.
- The second RSS Endurance (207) is an Endurance-class landing platform dock ship launched in 1998 and currently in service.
