= USS LST-579 =

1944 LST-542-class tank landing ship

History

United States
- Name: LST-629
- Builder: Chicago Bridge and Iron Company, Seneca
- Laid down: 4 May 1944
- Launched: 22 June 1944
- Commissioned: 21 July 1944
- Renamed: T-LST-579
- Decommissioned: 24 February 1946
- Recommissioned: 31 March 1952
- Decommissioned: 15 June 1973
- Fate: Sold to Republic of Singapore Navy, 5 December 1975

Singapore
- Name: Intrepid
- Namesake: Intrepid
- Acquired: 5 December 1975
- Commissioned: 1 July 1971 (on loan)
- Decommissioned: 1999
- Home port: Changi Naval Base
- Identification: Pennant number: L-203
- Fate: Serving as a floating sea-defense barricade at Changi Naval Base
- Status: Decommissioned

General characteristics
- Class & type: LST-542-class tank landing ship
- Displacement: 1,625 long tons (1,651 t) light; 4,080 long tons (4,145 t) full
- Length: 328 ft (100 m)
- Beam: 50 ft (15 m)
- Draft: Unloaded : 2 ft 4 in (0.71 m) forward; 7 ft 6 in (2.29 m) aft; Loaded : 8 ft 2 in (2.49 m) forward; 14 ft 1 in (4.29 m) aft
- Propulsion: 2 × General Motors 12-567 diesel engines, two shafts, twin rudders
- Speed: 12 knots (22 km/h; 14 mph)
- Boats & landing craft carried: 2 × LCVPs
- Troops: 16 officers, 147 enlisted men
- Complement: 7 officers, 104 enlisted men
- Armament: 8 × 40 mm guns; 12 × 20 mm guns

USS LST-579 originally was a United States Navy LST-542-class tank landing ship built during World War II and in commission from 1944 to 1946 and again in the late 1952. She was sold to the Republic of Singapore Navy and renamed RSS Intrepid (L-203).

== Construction and commissioning ==
USS LST-579 was laid down on 4 May 1944 at Leavenworth, Kansas, by the Missouri Valley Bridge & Iron Co. She was launched on 22 June 1944 and commissioned on 11 July 1944.

== Service in United States Navy ==
=== 1940s ===
During World War II, LST-579 was assigned to the Asiatic-Pacific Campaign and participated in Invasion of Lingayen Gulf from 4 to 18 January 1945. She also participating in the Mindanao Islands landing from 10 to 18 March and 17 to 23 April 1945. LST-579 participated in Balikpapan Operation, the invasion of Borneo on 26 June to 10 July 1945. LST-629 was assigned to China service and was decommissioned on 24 February 1946, assigned for Commander Naval Forces Far East (COMNAVFE) Shipping Control Authority for Japan (SCAJAP) and redesignated as Q073.

=== 1950s–1960s ===
LST-629 was transferred to the Military Sea Transportation Service (MSTS), 31 March 1952 and redesignated as USNS T-LST-579.

== Service in Republic of Singapore Navy ==
=== 1970s–1990s ===
T-LST-579 was on loan since 1 July 1971 but finally sold to Singapore on 5 December 1975 and was renamed as RSS Intrepid (L-203). Intrepid, along with four other ex-US Navy LSTs sold to Singapore by the US at around the same period of time, served as part of the RSN's 191 Squadron of the 3rd Flotilla, with its main roles being transporting Singapore Army troops and personnel to training facilities abroad (in foreign countries such as Taiwan), rescue-and-aid operations, supply missions as well as for officer-cadet training programmes conducted overseas.

In 1999, Intrepid, along with RSS Excellence, was deployed to Timor Leste to provide logistic support to Australian-led INTERFET peacekeeping operations.

=== 2000s–2010s ===
All four ex-US Navy LSTs are employed as floating sea-defense barricades for Changi Naval Base.

== Awards and honors ==
- American Campaign Medal
- Asiatic-Pacific Campaign Medal (4 awards)
- World War II Victory Medal
- Philippines Presidential Unit Citation
- Philippines Liberation Medal (2 awards)
- Navy Occupation Service Medal with "Asia" clasp
