= BLRT Western Shipyard =

- BLRT Western Shipyard logo

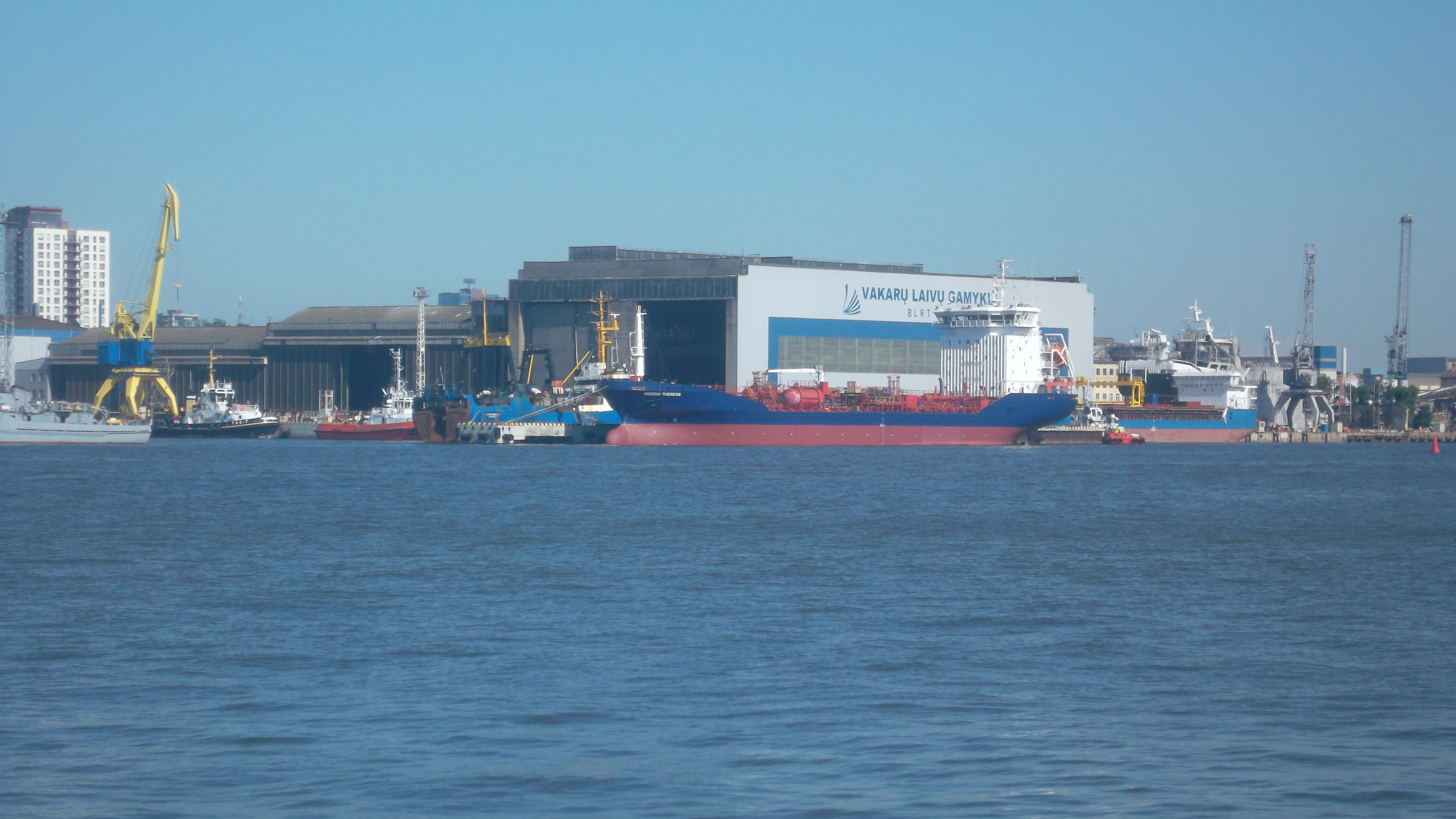
- Western Shipyard in Klaipėda, 2013
- Native name: AB Vakarų laivų gamykla
- Company type: Public limited company
- Industry: Ship building
- Founded: 1952
- Headquarters: Klaipėda, Lithuania
- Revenue: €18.0 mln (2022)
- Operating income: €6.2 mln (2022)
- Net income: €5.9 mln (2022)
- Total assets: €77.8 mln (2022)
- Total equity: €57.15 mln (2022)
- Number of employees: 141
- Parent: BLRT Grupp
- Website: wsy.lt

BLRT Western Shipyard (Vakarų laivų gamykla) is a shipyard in Klaipėda, Lithuania. The company belongs to the Estonian company BLRT Grupp and provides shipbuilding and repair services in the Baltic region.

== History ==
In 1952 the USSR built a new shipyard called Baltijos laivų statykla (Baltija Shipbuilding Yard) was established. In 1969, another shipyard called Vakarų laivų remonto gamykla (Western Ship Repair Factory) was built. Following the restoration of independence, the government of Lithuania privatized the shipyards. In 1997, Baltijos laivų statykla was sold to a Danish company Odense Steel Shipyard, while in 2001 Vakarų laivų remonto gamykla was sold to the Estonian company BLRT Grupp. In 2010, the Baltijos laivų statykla was taken over by the BLRT Grupp, thus merging both shipyards under the Western Baltija Shipbuilding within the Western Shipyard Group.

== Activities ==
The main activities of the company are shipbuilding, ship repair and conversion, complex ship design and engineering as well as metal construction.

In 2011, the shipyard built the largest LNG-powered Norwegian ferry MF Boknafjord.

In June 2020, the largest floating dock (235 m long and 45 m wide, with lifting capacity of 33,000 tons) in the Baltic States was installed in the shipyard.
