= Victory-class multi-role combat vessel =

Vessel class of the Republic of Singapore Navy

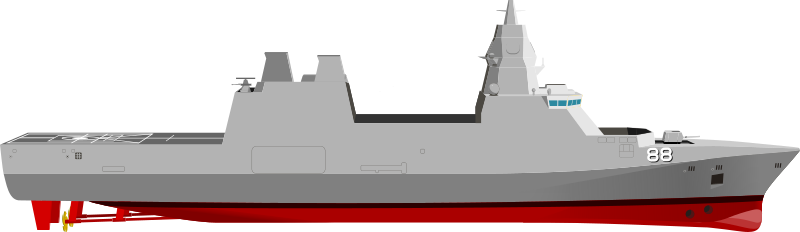
- Drawing of the Victory-class multi-role combat vessel

Class overview
- Name: Victory class
- Builders: ST Engineering Marine Ltd
- Operators: Republic of Singapore Navy
- Preceded by: Victory-class missile corvette
- Built: 2024–present
- On order: 6
- Building: 4

General characteristics
- Displacement: 8,000 tonnes (7,870 long tons; 8,820 short tons)
- Length: 150 m (492 ft 2 in)
- Beam: 21.04 m (69 ft 0 in)
- Draught: 5.7 m (18 ft 8 in)
- Speed: In excess of 22 knots (40.7 km/h; 25.3 mph)
- Range: >7,000 nautical miles (13,000 km)
- Complement: <100
- Sensors & processing systems: Systems: Combat management system: TBA; MCM operations: Thales M-Cube (with MiMap sonar data analysis tool) (TBC); Mast: SLIM (Saab Lightweight Integrated Mast); Radars: 4 × Thales SeaFire fixed panels, 4D, S-band (IEEE), AESA, GaN, early-warning and fire-control radar; Sonars: Hull-mounted sonar: TBA; Mine warfare towed sonars: T-SAS towed sonars (modular container that can be added / removed from the ship), equipped with: Thales SAMDIS NG; Kraken Robotics KATFISH; Exail T18-M; E/O sensors: Safran (TBC); Navigation: Navigation radar: TBA
- Armament: Torpedoes: TBA; Missiles: Anti-ship missiles: TBA; 32-cell anti-air missiles: (TBC); Aster 30 B1 NT (TBC); VL MICA NG (TBC); Guns: 1 × STRALES 76mm Guided Gun (caliber 76×636mmR); 2 × Typhoon Mk 30c RCWS (Mk44S Bushmaster II chain gun, 30×173mm); Non-lethal: Acoustic system: MASS CS-524
- Aviation facilities: Flight deck and hangar
- Notes: Sources:

The Victory-class multi-role combat vessel (MRCV) is a class of six ships being constructed for service with the Republic of Singapore Navy (RSN), succeeding the Victory-class missile corvettes. First revealed in 2018, it is under development by the Defence Science and Technology Agency, DSO National Laboratories and ST Engineering, in a partnership with Swedish firm Saab Kockums and Danish firm Odense Maritime Technology.

The Ministry of Defence intends for the MRCV to fulfill two functions: to carry out the combat operations typical of a modern frigate and act as a base for autonomous and unmanned vehicles operating on the surface, underwater, and in the air. The class is slated for phased commissioning from 2028 to 2030, and will be among the largest vessels in the RSN when it enters service.

== Planning and acquisition ==
An infographic released by the Ministry of Defence (MINDEF) on 30 June 2018 depicted the multi-role combat vessel (MRCV). At a media conference for Singapore Armed Forces (SAF) Day on 1 July, Defence Minister Ng Eng Hen confirmed plans for the proposed MRCV. The vessel was later discussed during the Committee of Supply debate in Parliament on 1 March 2019, which focused on future SAF procurements. The MRCV was again included in a 2019 document "Building the Next Generation Singapore Armed Forces", alongside the Invincible-class submarine and joint multi-mission ship, as part of the RSN's upcoming acquisitions.

In November 2019, Chief of Navy Lew Chuen Hong said that the RSN was establishing "detailed procedures" for the planning and design phases of the MRCV. The contract for the procurement for six MRCVs was signed with ST Engineering Marine Ltd on 27 March 2023. The RSN reaffirmed its intention to acquire a new class of vessels to replace the aging Victory-class missile corvettes, which were first commissioned in 1989, on 27 April 2023.

== Design and construction ==
Swedish firm Saab Kockums and Danish firm Odense Maritime Technology (OMT) were originally two of the competitors for the MRCV program, with the Swedish basing its design on the Visby-class corvette and the Danish on the Absalon-class and Iver Huitfeldt-class frigates. They subsequently merged their designs to form a single proposal, using Saab Kockums' combat and propulsion systems together with OMT's hull design and payload management system. OMT is officially a subcontractor to Saab Kockums, but the two companies proceeded on the bid on an equal basis, ultimately winning over other bids for the MRCV program.

The Defence Science and Technology Agency (DSTA) signed a contract with Saab Kockums for the latter to provide six composite superstructures for the MRCV on 22 August 2024. Saab Kockums will develop detailed designs and handle the production and assembly of the composite superstructure in partnership with OMT. The composite superstructure is claimed to improve the ship's stability by lowering the center of gravity, weighing 50% lighter than steel. Nevertheless, the 60,000kg forward mast had to be disassembled and shipped from Sweden in flatpacks, as it was too heavy to transport in one piece. The mast was then locally reassembled by Penguin Shipyard International in collaboration with Saab.

ST Engineering created a virtual model of the MRCV to test the design, which eliminated the need to build a physical prototype, allowing for reworks to be done more efficiently. The DSO National Laboratories (DSO) is also involved in the project in an unspecified capacity. The lead ship Victory was launched at ST Engineering's Benoi Yard on 21 October 2025 by the spouse of Defence Minister Chan Chun Sing, in a ceremony officiated by the minister. Gul Yard will then take over Victory's fitting out and sea trials. As of April 2026, the MRCV program had reached the stage where work was progressing on four hulls simultaneously.

== Capabilities ==
MINDEF has stated that the MRCV will perform two main functions: to carry out the combat operations typical of a modern frigate and act as the "mothership" for an array of unmanned forces, with the ability to deploy unmanned aerial vehicles, unmanned surface vessels, and autonomous underwater vehicles. In 2019, the RSN said that the MRCV was planned to embark the Venus 16 USV.

Its mission bay contains room for eight mission modules, enabling the MRCV's weapon complement and embarked assets to be customized and upgraded according to operational needs, including humanitarian assistance and disaster relief (HADR) missions. There will be two launch and recovery systems (LARS) for small craft, one on the port side and the other at the stern. It also has a built-in simulator, reducing the reliance on shore-based facilities for training.

Integrated full electric propulsion (IFEP) supplied by GE Vernova will power the MRCV's propulsion and combat systems. While IFEP can be powered by both diesel engines and gas turbines simultaneously, DSTA opted against the latter to avoid the need for a new maintenance and training program, as the rest of the RSN is exclusively diesel-powered. This results in the MRCV's lower top speed and acceleration, which DSTA judged is offset by the use of automation and autonomous platforms. Its powerplant is reported to be capable of generating 30MW of electricity.

=== Armaments ===
The main gun of the MRCV will be the STRALES 76mm Guided Gun, developed by Leonardo. Leonardo also offered the Hitrole for the secondary gun armament, but lost out to Rafael's Typhoon Mk-30c 30mm Remotely-Controlled Weapon System.

The MRCV is expected to embark a mixture of VL MICA NG and Aster 30 Block 1 NT surface-to-air missiles, variants which are currently in use on the Independence-class littoral mission vessels and Formidable-class frigates respectively, making it the first RSN platform to utilize both. While the MRCV's surface-to-surface missile has not been announced, Naval News reported in 2023 that the Blue Spear surface-to-surface missile, in joint development between ST Engineering and Israel Aerospace Industries, has been chosen.

As of 2023, EuroTorp's MU90 Impact and Leonardo's A244 torpedo were under consideration for the MRCV's underwater warfare suite.

=== Sensors ===
Four active electronically scanned arrays can be integrated into the forward mast; the Sea Fire multifunction radar will be provided by Thales. Electro-Optical/Infra-Red (EO/IR) camera equipment will be provided by Safran.

== Ships in class ==
The MRCVs will adopt the names and pennant numbers of the Victory-class missile corvettes.

| No. | Name | Status | Contract | Steel cut | Laid down | Launched | Comm. | Notes |
|---|---|---|---|---|---|---|---|---|
| 88 | RSS Victory | Sea trial / fitting out | 27 Mar 2023 | 8 Mar 2024 | 22 Oct 2024 | 21 Oct 2025 | 2028 | |
| 89 | RSS Valour | Under construction | 27 Mar 2023 | 24 Apr 2025 | 27 Jan 2026 | 23 Jul 2026 | 2029 | |
| 90 | RSS Vigilance | Under construction | 27 Mar 2023 | 29 Apr 2026 | 3 Sep 2026 | - | - | |
| 91 | RSS Valiant | Under construction | 27 Mar 2023 | 29 Apr 2026 | - | - | - | |
| 92 | RSS Vigour | On order | 27 Mar 2023 | - | - | - | - | |
| 93 | RSS Vengeance | On order | 27 Mar 2023 | - | - | - | - | |

Planned dates

== See also ==
- List of ships of the Republic of Singapore Navy
