= USS LST-649 =

Training ship repurposed from tank landing ship

Coordinates: 1.2944208°N 103.6602877°E

History

United States
- Name: LST-649
- Builder: Chicago Bridge and Iron Company, Seneca
- Laid down: 19 July 1944
- Launched: 6 October 1944
- Commissioned: 26 October 1944
- Renamed: T-LST-649
- Decommissioned: 5 March 1946
- Recommissioned: 31 March 1952
- Decommissioned: Late 1960s
- Fate: Sold to Republic of Singapore Navy, 5 December 1975

Singapore
- Name: Resolution
- Namesake: Resolution
- Acquired: 5 December 1975
- Commissioned: 1 July 1971 (on loan)
- Decommissioned: 1999
- Home port: Tuas Naval Base
- Identification: Pennant number: L-204
- Status: Training ship

General characteristics
- Class & type: LST-542-class tank landing ship
- Displacement: 1,625 long tons (1,651 t) light; 4,080 long tons (4,145 t) full
- Length: 328 ft (100 m)
- Beam: 50 ft (15 m)
- Draft: Unloaded : 2 ft 4 in (0.71 m) forward; 7 ft 6 in (2.29 m) aft; Loaded : 8 ft 2 in (2.49 m) forward; 14 ft 1 in (4.29 m) aft
- Propulsion: 2 × General Motors 12-567 diesel engines, two shafts, twin rudders
- Speed: 12 knots (22 km/h; 14 mph)
- Boats & landing craft carried: 2 × LCVPs
- Troops: 16 officers, 147 enlisted men
- Complement: 7 officers, 104 enlisted men
- Armament: 8 × 40 mm guns; 12 × 20 mm guns
- Aviation facilities: Deck as helipad

USS LST-649 originally was a United States Navy LST-542-class tank landing ship built during World War II and in commission from 1944 to 1946 and again in the late 1952. She was sold to the Republic of Singapore Navy and renamed RSS Resolution (L-204).

== Construction and commissioning ==
USS LST-649 was laid down on 19 July 1944 at Seneca, Illinois, by the Chicago Bridge and Iron Company. She was launched on 6 October 1944 and commissioned on 26 October 1944.

== Service in United States Navy ==
=== 1940s ===
During World War II, LST-649 was assigned to the Asiatic-Pacific Campaign and participated in Okinawa Gunto Operations, the invasion of southern Okinawa on 26 March to 30 June 1945. At the close of World War II, LST-649 remained in active service in Amphibious Force, United States Navy on the Far East. LST-649 was decommissioned on 5 March 1946, assigned for Commander Naval Forces Far East (COMNAVFE) Shipping Control Authority for Japan (SCAJAP) and redesignated as Q058.

=== 1950s ===
LST-649 was transferred to the Military Sea Transportation Service (MSTS), 31 March 1952 and redesignated as USNS T-LST-649.

=== 1960s ===
T-LST-649 made a trip to Vietnam during the Vietnam War carrying cargos. She beached at a ramp north of Chu Lai Vietnam Marine compound on 12 March 1966. She was stricken and decommissioned in late 1960s.

== Service in Republic of Singapore Navy ==
=== 1970s-1990s ===
On loan since 1 July 1971, T-LST-649 was finally sold to Singapore on 5 December 1975 and renamed RSS Resolution (L-204). Resolution, along with four other ex-US Navy LSTs sold to Singapore by the US at around the same period of time, served as part of the RSN's 191 Squadron of the 3rd Flotilla, with its main roles being transporting Singapore Army troops and personnel to training facilities abroad (in foreign countries such as Taiwan), rescue-and-aid operations, supply missions as well as for officer-cadet training programmes conducted overseas.

While docked alongside Bedok Jetty in support of Operation Thunderstorm, Resolution provided shelter to 269 Vietnamese refugees who had landed at Tanjong Rhu in a fishing trawler during a storm on 17 December 1978. The refugees were provided with fuel and supplies to leave Singapore for another destination on 18 December.

Resolution and her sister ships were decommissioned in 1999 following the commissioning of RSS Endurance (207).

=== 2000s-2010s ===
Resolution now docked in Tuas Naval Base, Singapore to this day as a training ship since 2000s and sometimes spotted holding containers on its deck. RSS Resolution is last in existence of the LST-542-class in the Republic of Singapore Navy.

== Awards and honors ==
- Asiatic-Pacific Campaign Medal
- Navy Occupation Service Medal
