= USS LST-613 =

US Navy tank landing ship

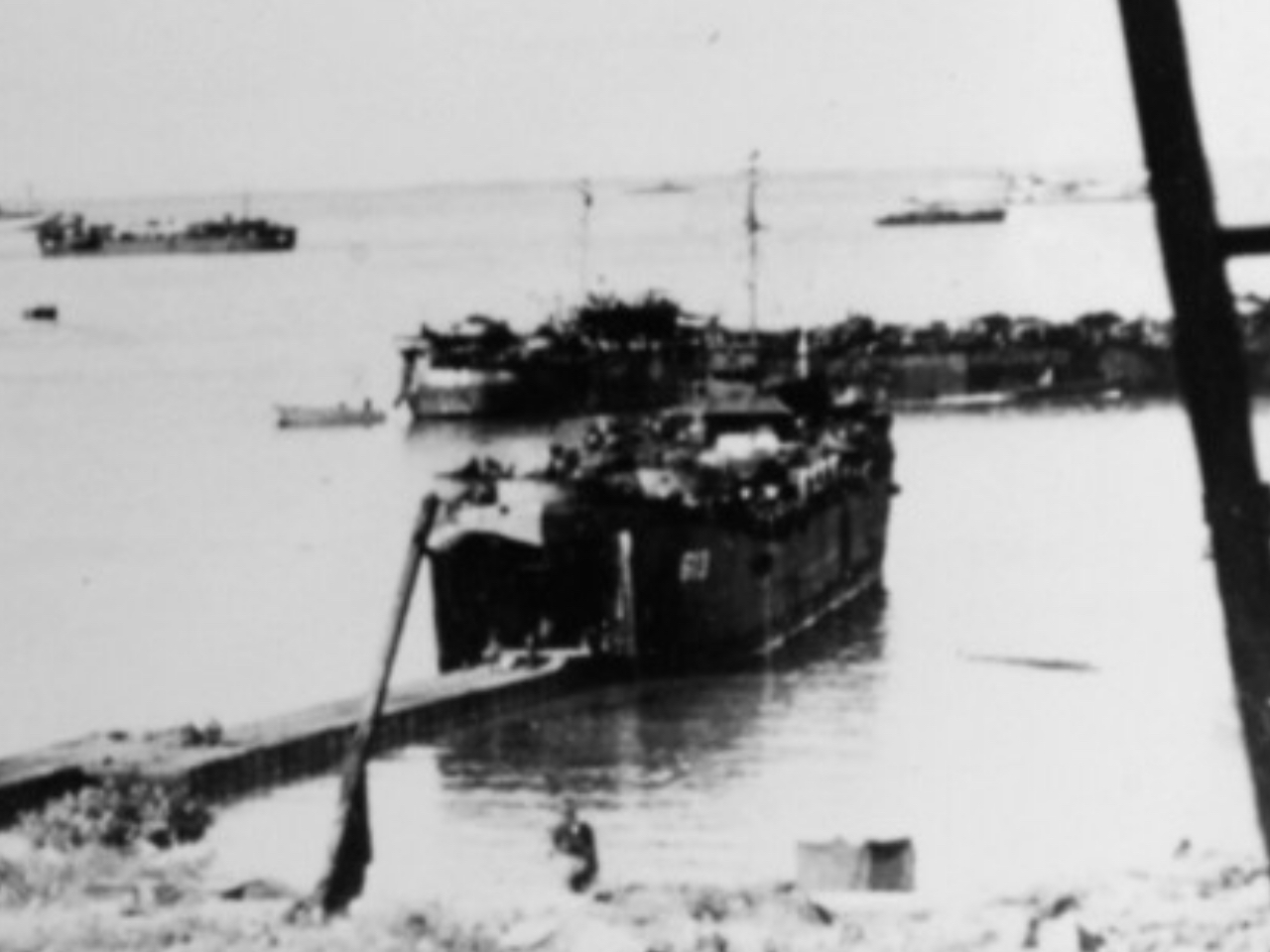
- USS LST-613 in May 1945

History

United States
- Name: LST-613
- Builder: Chicago Bridge and Iron Company, Seneca
- Laid down: 21 January 1944
- Launched: 2 May 1944
- Commissioned: 19 May 1944
- Decommissioned: 6 January 1946
- In service: 31 March 1952
- Out of service: Late 1960s
- Renamed: T-LST-613
- Stricken: 30 June 1975
- Fate: Sold to Republic of Singapore Navy, 1 June 1976

Singapore
- Name: Persistence
- Namesake: Persistence
- Acquired: 1 June 1976
- Commissioned: 1 July 1971 (on loan)
- Decommissioned: 1999
- Home port: Changi Naval Base, Singapore
- Identification: L-205
- Fate: Serving as a floating sea-defense barricade at Changi Naval Base
- Status: Decommissioned

General characteristics
- Class & type: LST-542-class tank landing ship
- Displacement: 1,625 long tons (1,651 t) light; 4,080 long tons (4,145 t) full
- Length: 328 ft (100 m)
- Beam: 50 ft (15 m)
- Draft: Unloaded : 2 ft 4 in (0.71 m) forward; 7 ft 6 in (2.29 m) aft; Loaded : 8 ft 2 in (2.49 m) forward; 14 ft 1 in (4.29 m) aft
- Propulsion: 2 × General Motors 12-567 diesel engines, two shafts, twin rudders
- Speed: 12 knots (22 km/h; 14 mph)
- Boats & landing craft carried: 2 × LCVPs
- Troops: 16 officers, 147 enlisted men
- Complement: 7 officers, 104 enlisted men
- Armament: 8 × 40 mm guns; 12 × 20 mm guns
- Aviation facilities: Deck as helipad

USS LST-613 originally was a United States Navy LST-542-class tank landing ship built during World War II and in commission from 1944 to 1946, and again in the late 1952. In 1976, she was sold to the Republic of Singapore Navy and renamed RSS Persistence (L-205).

== Construction and commissioning ==
LST-613 was laid down on 21 January 1944, at Seneca, Illinois, by the Chicago Bridge and Iron Company. She was launched on 2 May 1944, and commissioned on 19 May 1944.

== Service in United States Navy ==
=== 1940s ===
During World War II, LST-613 was assigned to the Asiatic-Pacific Campaign and participated in Morotai landings, the invasion of Indonesia on 15 September 1944. Leyte landings, 19 to 29 November 1944. Mindoro landings, 12 to 18 December 1944, in the Philippines and Lingayen Gulf landings, 6 to 17 January 1945. Visayan Island landing, 18 March 1945, and Tarakan Island operation, 27 April to 5 May 1945. At the close of World War II, LST-613 remained in active service in Amphibious Force, United States Navy on the Far East. LST-613 was decommissioned on 6 January 1946, assigned for Commander Naval Forces Far East (COMNAVFE) Shipping Control Authority for Japan (SCAJAP) and redesignated as Q038.

=== 1950s ===
LST-613 was transferred to the Military Sea Transportation Service (MSTS), 31 March 1952, and redesignated as USNS T-LST-613.

=== 1960s ===
T-LST-613 made a trip to Vietnam, during the Vietnam War, carrying cargos. She beached at the Da Nang Bridge Ramp, circa February 1969.

== Service in Republic of Singapore Navy ==
=== 1970s-1990s ===
T-LST-613 was on loan since 1 July 1971, but finally sold to Singapore on 1 June 1976, and was renamed as RSS Persistence (L-205). Persistence, along with four other ex-US Navy LSTs sold to Singapore by the US at around the same period of time, served as part of the RSN's 191 Squadron of the 3rd Flotilla, with its main roles being transporting Singapore Army troops and personnel to training facilities abroad (in foreign countries such as Taiwan), rescue-and-aid operations, supply missions as well as for officer-cadet training programmes conducted overseas.

=== 2000s-2010s ===
All four ex-US Navy LSTs are employed as floating sea-defense barricades for Changi Naval Base.

== Awards and honors ==
- American Campaign Medal
- Asiatic-Pacific Campaign Medal (5 awards)
- World War II Victory Medal
- Navy Occupation Service Medal with "Asia" clasp
- Philippines Liberation Medal (2 awards)
- Philippines Presidential Unit Citation
