= Victory-class corvette =

Class of missile corvette

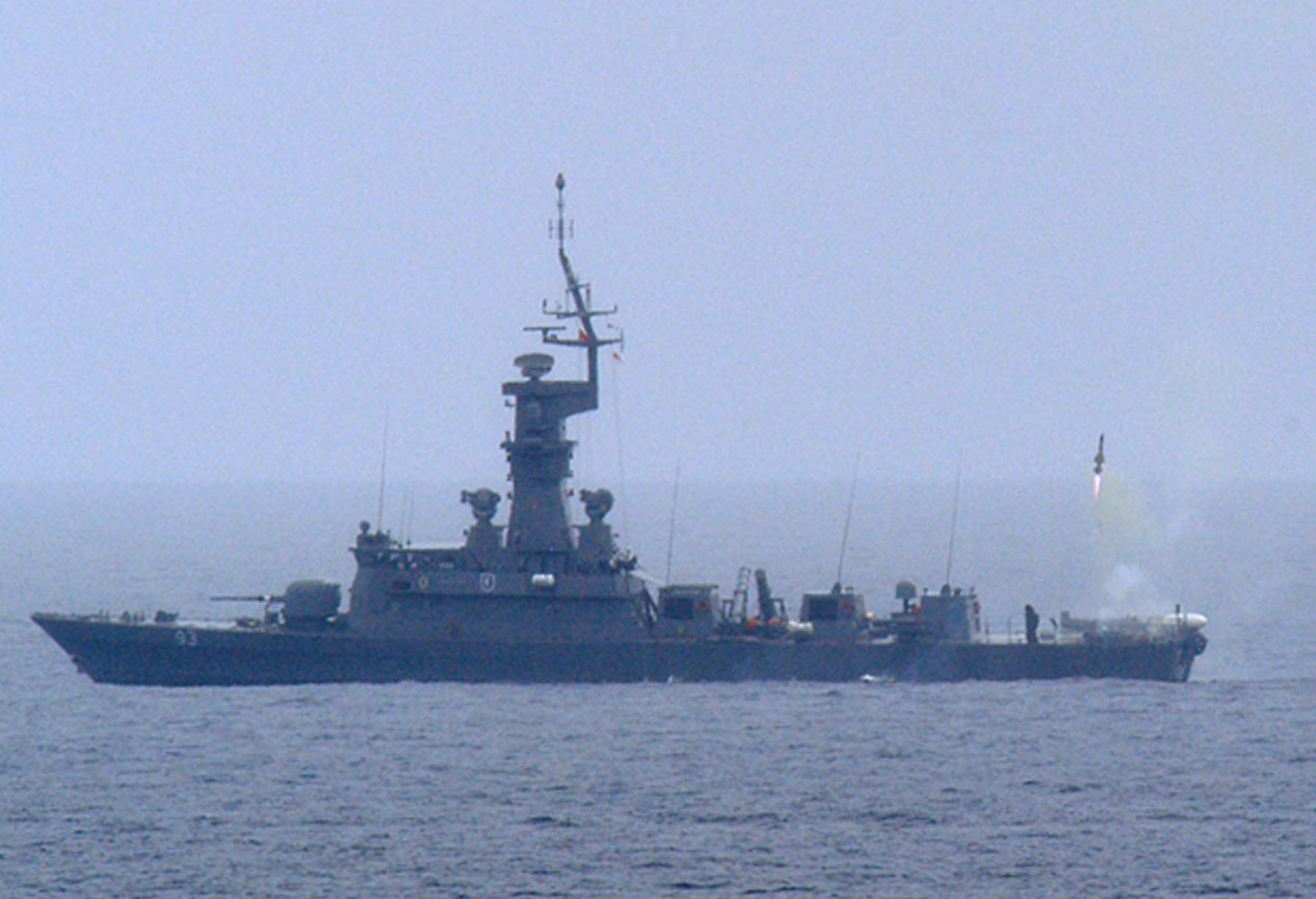
- RSS Vengeance during CARAT 2006, launching missile

Class overview
- Name: Victory class
- Builders: Friedrich Lürssen Werft / ST Engineering (Marine)
- Operators: Republic of Singapore Navy
- Succeeded by: Victory-class MRCV
- Completed: 6
- Active: 6

General characteristics
- Type: Corvette
- Displacement: 595 t (586 long tons; 656 short tons)
- Length: 62 m (203 ft 5 in)
- Beam: 8.5 m (27 ft 11 in)
- Draught: 2.6 m (8 ft 6 in)
- Propulsion: 4× Maybach MTU 16 V 538 TB93 high speed diesels coupled to 4× shafts; Total output: 16,900 hp (12,600 kW)
- Speed: Maximum: 37 knots (69 km/h; 43 mph); Cruising: 18 knots (33 km/h; 21 mph)
- Range: 4,000 nmi (7,400 km) at 18 knots (33 km/h; 21 mph)
- Complement: 49 with 8 officers
- Sensors & processing systems: Search radar: Ericsson/Radamec Sea Giraffe 150HC (G/H band) / Saab Sea Giraffe AMB post-2011 SLEP; Navigation radar: Kelvin Hughes 1007 (I band); Weapon control: Elbit MSIS optronic director; Sonar: Thomson Sintra TSM 2064 VDS
- Electronic warfare & decoys: ESM: Elisra SEWS; ECM: RAFAEL RAN 1101 Jammer; Decoys: 2× Plessey Shield 9-barrelled chaff launchers, 2× twin RAFAEL long range chaff launchers fitted below the bridge wings
- Armament: Anti-ship: 8 × Boeing Harpoon; Anti-air: 2 × 8-cell VLS for IAI/RAFAEL Barak; Anti-submarine: EuroTorp A244/S Mod 1 torpedoes launched from 2 × triple-tubes(all removed); Main gun: 1 × Oto Melara 76mm Super Rapid gun; Machine guns: 4 × STK 50MG 12.7 mm (0.50 in) HMGs
- Aircraft carried: 1× Boeing ScanEagle unmanned aerial vehicle (UAV)
- Notes: Ships in class include: RSS Victory (88); RSS Valour (89); RSS Vigilance (90); RSS Valiant (91); RSS Vigour (92); RSS Vengeance (93)

The Victory-class corvettes are multi-purpose corvettes based on the MGB 62 design by Germany's Lürssen shipyard for the Republic of Singapore Navy (RSN). The six ships were commissioned between 1990 and 1991 and form the Eighth Flotilla of the RSN.

== History ==
In the 1960s and 1970s, the RSN was primarily concerned with coast guard duties. From the late 1970s, however, pressure from senior naval officers led to planning for expanded naval responsibilities and capabilities in a strategic change in Singapore's defence posture, as the Navy sought to redefine its purpose and project power in the region for deterrence. Singapore's growing regional trade led to a top-level review of the RSN's mission, with the navy assigned the role of defending Singapore's sea lines of communication (SLOCs). Before the introduction of the MCVs, the RSN's principal strike craft, made up by Sea Wolf-class missile gun boats (MGBs), were equipped to handle surface and air threats, but not underwater submarine threats. The corvettes, equipped with variable-depth sonar and lightweight torpedoes, were the first class of ship in the RSN to have anti-submarine capabilities to counter the threat from the increased number of submarines passing through the Malacca Strait, with Soviet submarines having been tracked passing through entirely submerged. As part of a subsequent expansion programme, the RSN ordered a squadron of missile corvettes from Lürssen Werft in 1983. The first, RSS Victory, was built and launched in Germany while the remaining five were built locally by Singapore Shipbuilding & Engineering (now Singapore Technologies (ST) Marine), providing the RSN with the ability to move beyond the seaward defence of Singapore to fulfil a strategic role in the protection of vital SLOCs.

The MCVs have undergone various enhancements to better deal with evolving threats and to tackle technology obsolescence. In 1996, the corvettes were fitted with two sets of 8-cell Barak I launchers, a second fire control radar on the platform aft of the mast and an optronic director on the bridge roof. Rudder roll stabilisation was also retrofitted to improve sea-keeping qualities. In 2009, it was announced that the corvettes would undergo a Life Extension Programme. In 2012, the class was upgraded with a single ScanEagle UAV, RSS Valiant being the first to be so outfitted. However, this upgrade saw the removal of their anti-submarine capabilities, which now reside with the Formidable-class frigates and their organic S-70B Seahawk naval helicopters.

Besides its primary role as the RSN's strike platform, the MCVs have participated in a variety of key exercises and operations during peacetime. RSS Vigour was deployed to the South China Sea in support of search efforts for the missing Malaysia Airlines Flight MH370 in 2014, while RSS Valour was similarly involved in the multinational search operations for Indonesia AirAsia Flight 8501 in 2015. RSS Valour was deployed to support security operations for the DPRK-USA Singapore Summit.

In 2018, the Ministry of Defence announced that all six corvettes would be replaced by new multi-role combat vessels.

== Vessels ==
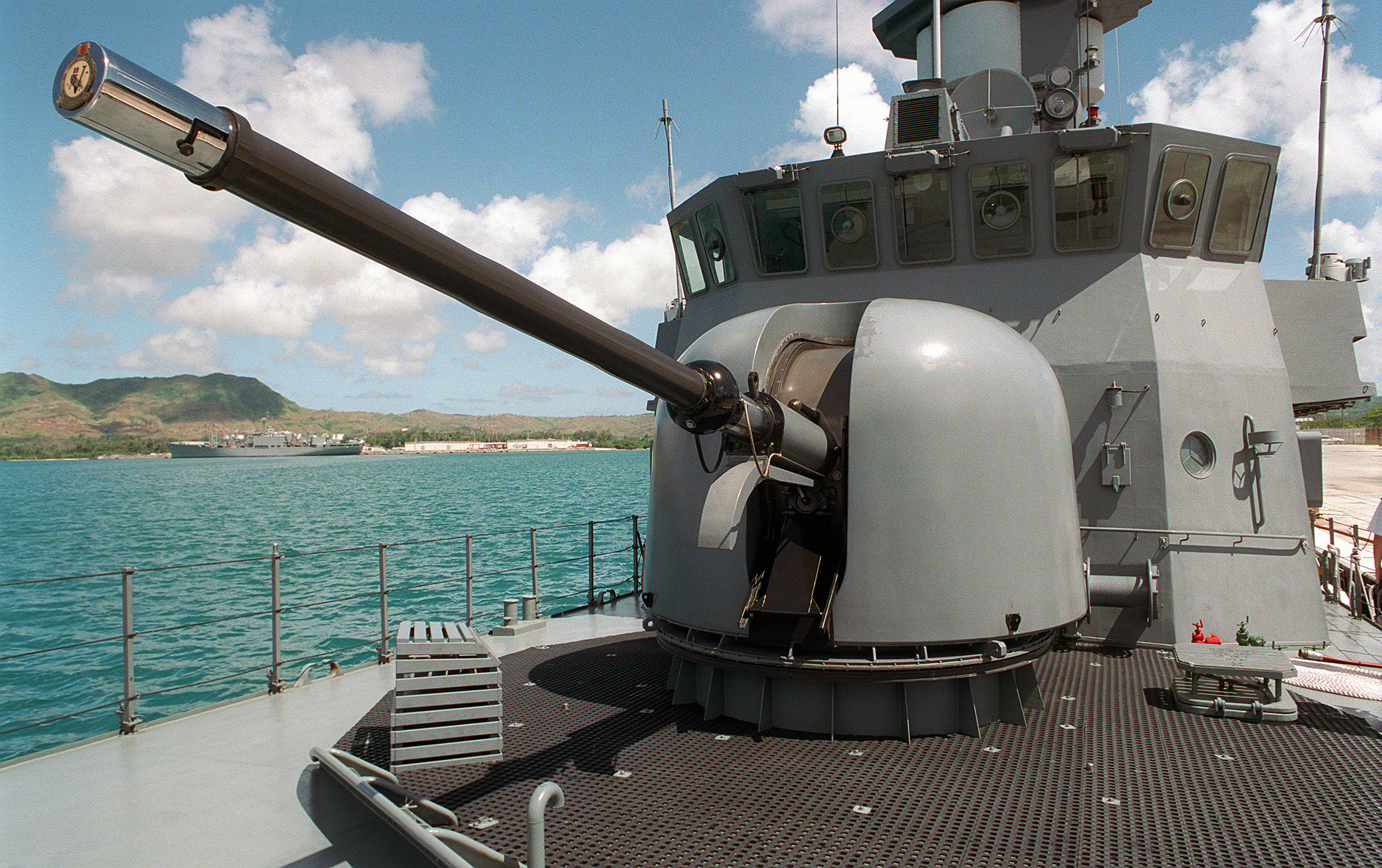
The OTO Melara 76mm Super Rapid gun mounted on the Victory-class corvette - RSS Valour

Name	Pennant number	Launched	Commissioned
RSS Victory	88	8 June 1988	18 August 1990
RSS Valour	89	10 December 1988	18 August 1990
RSS Vigilance	90	27 April 1989	18 August 1990
RSS Valiant	91	22 July 1989	25 May 1991
RSS Vigour	92	1 December 1989	25 May 1991
RSS Vengeance	93	23 December 1990	25 May 1991
