= Fearless-class patrol vessel =

Type of Singaporean naval vessel

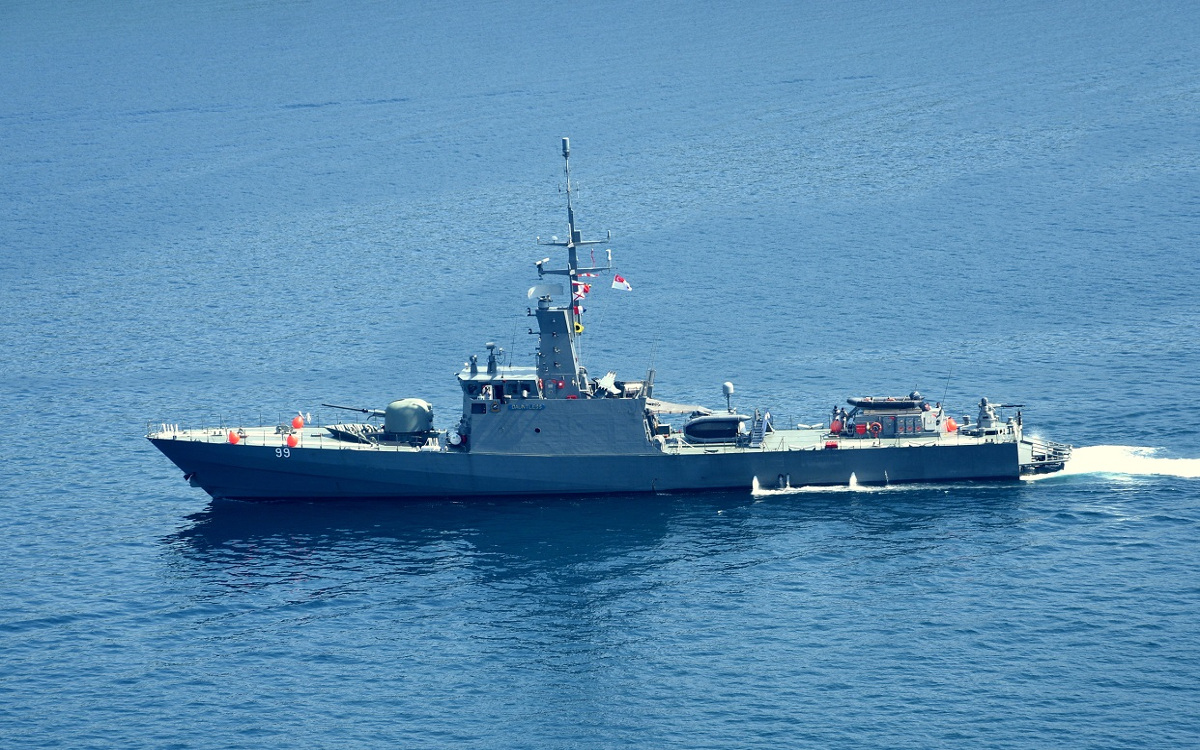
- RSS Dauntless, during the bilateral exercise MILAN 2018 with the Indian Navy.

Class overview
- Name: Fearless class
- Builders: ST Engineering (Marine); Abu Dhabi Ship Building PJSC
- Operators: Republic of Singapore Navy; Royal Navy of Oman; United Arab Emirates Navy; Royal Brunei Navy
- Preceded by: Swift class
- Succeeded by: Independence class
- Subclasses: Al-Ofouq class (Oman); Falaj-3 class (UAE)
- Built: 1995–1998
- In commission: 1996–2020 (Singapore); 2023–present (Brunei)
- Completed: 12
- Active: 2 (in Brunei service)
- Lost: 1 (Singapore)
- Retired: 11 (Singapore)

General characteristics
- Type: Patrol vessel
- Displacement: 500 tonnes (492 long tons)
- Length: 55.0 metres (180 ft 5 in)
- Beam: 8.6 metres (28 ft 3 in)
- Draught: 2.7 metres (8 ft 10 in)
- Propulsion: 2× MTU 12 V 595 TE 90 diesel engines coupled to ZF gearboxes driving 2× Kamewa waterjets
- Speed: In excess of 20 kn (37 km/h; 23 mph)
- Range: 1,000 nmi (1,852 km) at 15 kn (28 km/h; 17 mph)
- Sensors & processing systems: Search radar: IAI/ELTA EL/M-2228(X) (E/F band); Navigation radar: Kelvin Hughes 1007 (I band); Sonar: Thales Underwater Systems TSM 2362 Gudgeon hull-mounted medium frequency active sonar (first 6 ships); Weapon control: Elbit MSIS optronic director
- Electronic warfare & decoys: ESM: Elisra NS 9010C intercept, Rafael C-Pearl M; Decoys: 2× GEC Marine Shield III 102 mm sextuple fixed chaff launchers
- Armament: Anti-air: Mistral missile; Anti-submarine: EuroTorp A244/S Mod 1 torpedoes (first 6 ships); Main gun: Oto Melara 76 mm gun; Machine guns: 4× STK 50MG 12.7 mm (1 in) HMG

The Fearless-class patrol vessels were built by Singapore Technologies (ST) Marine for the Republic of Singapore Navy (RSN) in the 1990s. Four remain in service with the RSN as modified Sentinel-class maritime security and response vessels (MSRVs). Derivatives of the type are also in service in the navies of Brunei, Oman, and the United Arab Emirates.

== Development ==
The Fearless-class patrol vessels were ordered as replacements for the earlier Swift class coastal patrol craft after they had been transferred to the Police Coast Guard. The contract was awarded to ST Marine on 27 February 1993.

== Design and construction ==
The patrol vessel is powered by two MTU 12V 595 TE 90 turbocharged diesel engines coupled to ZF gearboxes. It is equipped with an MTU ship control monitoring and management system (SCMMS). In a departure from traditional conventional drives, the patrol vessel is fitted with twin waterjet systems developed by Kamewa of Sweden. The patrol vessel's main gun, installed on the bow deck, is the OTO Melara 76 mm Super Rapide. The patrol vessels are also armed with four CIS 50 12.7 mm machine guns. The air defence system is the Simbad twin missile launcher for the Mistral surface-to-air missile. The first six vessels of the class were fitted for anti-submarine warfare, and are additionally armed with triple tube 324 millimetres (13 in) B515 torpedo launchers from Whitehead Alenia Sistemi Subacquei S.p.A. (WASS).

=== Sentinel-class maritime security and response vessels ===
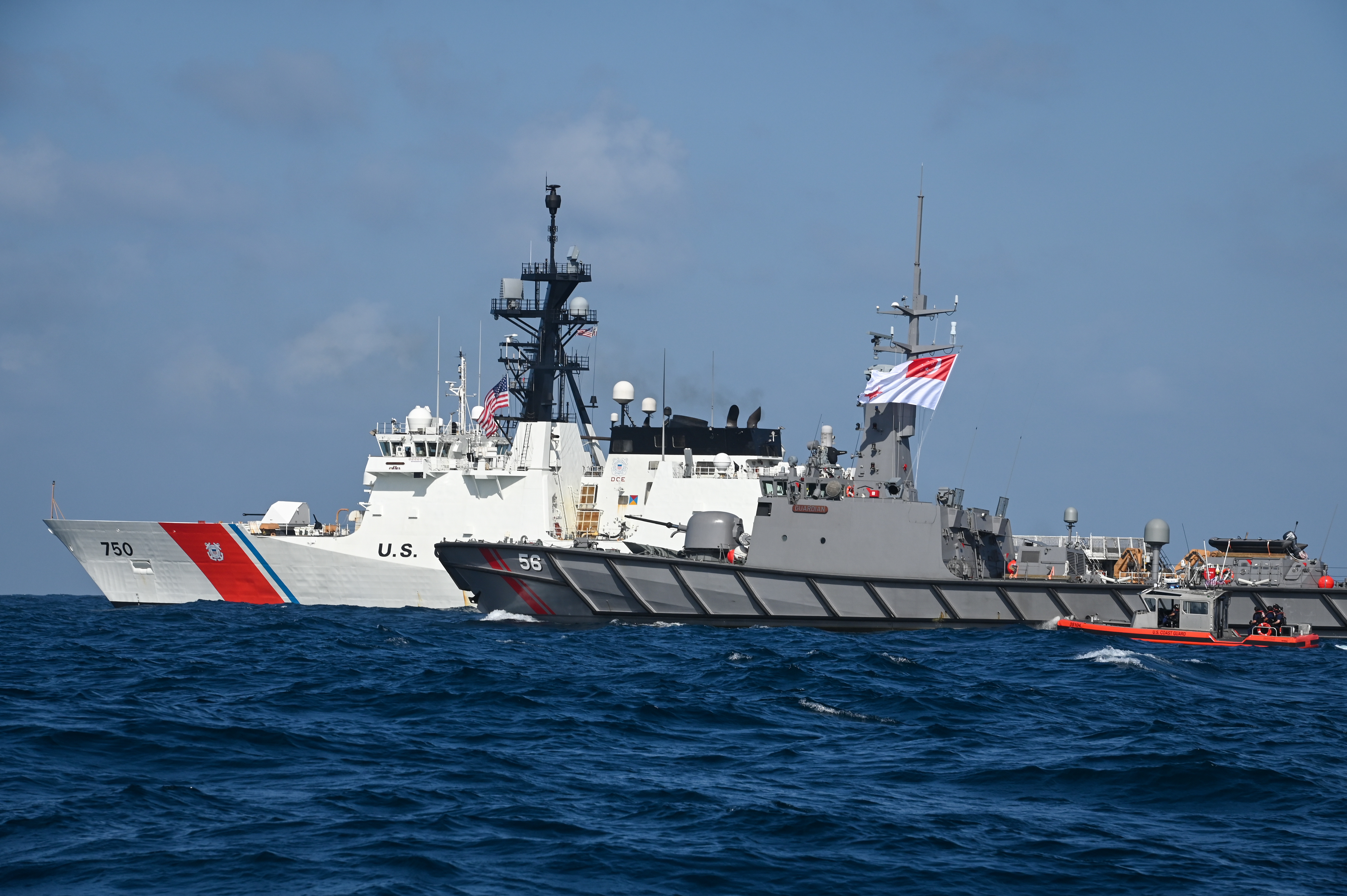
MSRV Guardian (56) alongside the National Security Cutter USCGC Bertholf

In 2021, four former Fearless-class patrol vessels were refurbished and re-inducted into service as Sentinel-class maritime security and response vessels (MSRV). The refurbishment plan was announced in March 2020 in response to the increase of sea robberies within the region, and foreign intrusions of Singapore territorial waters. The first two vessels, MSRV Sentinel (55) and Guardian (56), entered operational service with the RSN's Maritime Security and Response Flotilla on 26 January 2021, with the latter two, MSRV Protector (57) and Bastion (58), joining them on 20 January 2022.

In addition to refitting the vessels to extend their operational lifespan, the Sentinel-class MSRVs were fitted with a range of calibrated capabilities, including enhanced communications equipment, improved visual and audio warning systems, and modular ballistics protection on their superstructures. As part of the refit, non-lethal LRAD and laser dazzling systems were added to increase operational flexibility, while fenders were incorporated into the hull to come alongside vessels of interest. The MSRVs retain the 76 mm Oto Melara naval gun that was previously in service on the Fearless-class, but have additionally been equipped with a Typhoon 25 mm naval gun system at stern. For point defence, the MSRVs are also equipped with 7.62 mm machine gun positions near their bridge wings.

== Operational history ==
Over the years, the patrol vessel fleet has participated in various maritime security missions, safeguarding Singapore's waters, and deterring piracy and sea robbery, as well as search-and-rescue efforts.

On 3 January 2003, RSS Courageous was badly damaged in a collision with a container ship in the Singapore Strait. The ship has since been stricken from the navy list.

In January 2005, 189 Squadron was transferred to the Coastal Command from the Fleet, with the 11 ships forming the 182 and 189 Squadron.

On 30 January 2013, the Ministry of Defence of Singapore (MINDEF) awarded ST Engineering a contract to design and build a new class of eight littoral mission vessels (LMVs), which progressively replaced the Fearless-class patrol vessels from 2017. The final two Fearless-class patrol vessels, RSS Freedom and Gallant, were decommissioned in December 2020.

== Exports ==
In April 2012, ST Marine was awarded a contract by the Ministry of Defence of Oman to build four 75-metre (246 ft) patrol vessels based on the Fearless class. The vessels were delivered as the Al-Ofouq class between 2015 and 2016.

In November 2021, ST Engineering was awarded a sub-contract for design, platform equipment, and technical assistance by Abu Dhabi Ship Building (ADSB), which is building four Falaj 3-class offshore patrol vessels based on the Fearless-class for the United Arab Emirates Navy.

In March 2023, following their refurbishment, the former Republic of Singapore Navy (RSN) vessels RSS Brave and Gallant were transferred as a gift to the Royal Brunei Navy (RBN; Malay: Tentera Laut Diraja Brunei, TLDB), renamed as KDB As-Siddiq and KDB Al-Faruq.

== Ships of class ==
Fearless-class patrol vessels
name	pennant no.	launched	commissioned	decommissioned	notes
RSS Fearless	94	18 Feb 1995	5 Oct 1996	27 Aug 2019	
RSS Brave	95	9 Sep 1995	5 Oct 1996	27 Aug 2019	refurbished and gifted to the Royal Brunei Navy (RBN) as KDB As-Siddiq
RSS Courageous	96	9 Sep 1995	5 Oct 1996	—	stricken May 2003
RSS Gallant	97	27 Apr 1996	3 May 1997	11 Dec 2020	refurbished and gifted to the Royal Brunei Navy (RBN) as KDB Al-Faruq
RSS Daring	98	27 Apr 1996	3 May 1997	19 Jul 2018	
RSS Dauntless	99	23 Nov 1996	3 May 1997	27 Aug 2019	current MSRV Guardian (56)
RSS Resilience	82	23 Nov 1996	7 Feb 1998	19 Jul 2018	
RSS Unity	83	19 Jul 1997	7 Feb 1998	3 Oct 2017	
RSS Sovereignty	84	19 Jul 1997	7 Feb 1998	3 Oct 2017	
RSS Justice	85	18 Oct 1997	22 Aug 1998	3 Oct 2017	
RSS Freedom	86	18 Oct 1997	22 Aug 1998	11 Dec 2020	
RSS Independence	87	19 Apr 1998	22 Aug 1998	8 Mar 2017	
