= ICMS =

ICMS may refer to:

- Immigration Case Management Services
- International College of Management, Sydney
- Institute of Computer and Management Sciences
- International Centre for Mathematical Sciences
- Integrated Criminal Case Filing And Management System
