= RSS Courageous =

Fearless-class patrol vessel

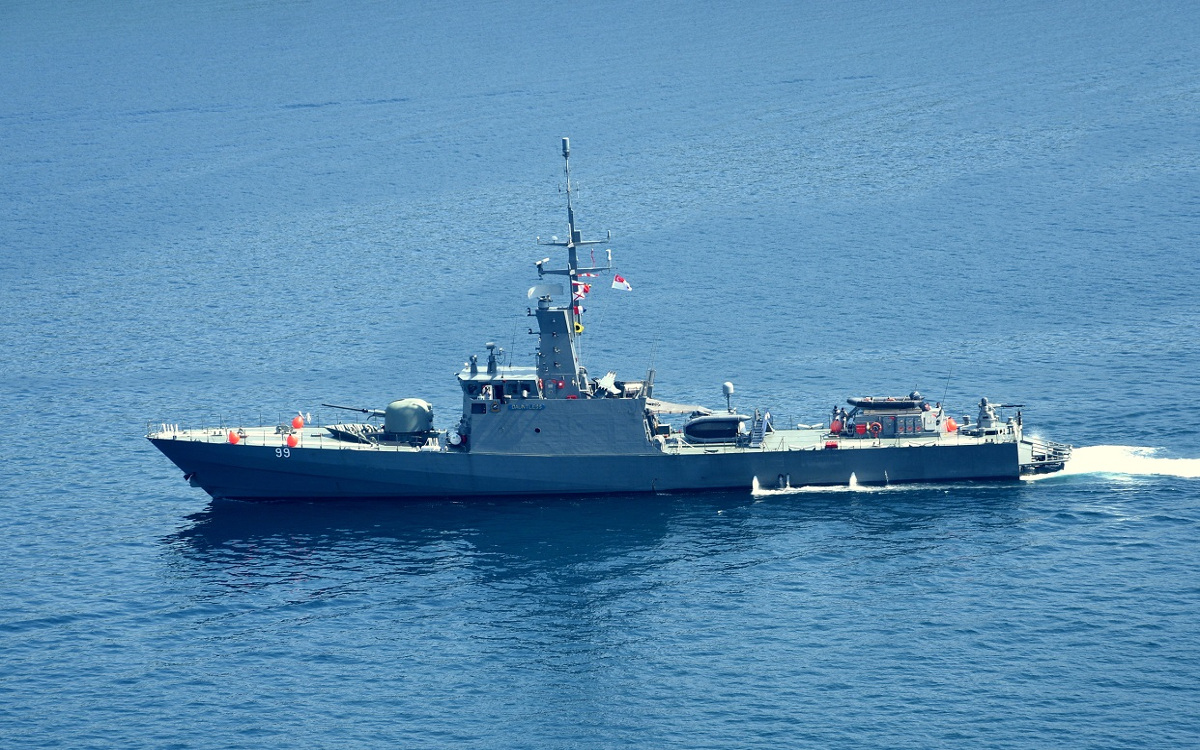
- Sister ship RSS Dauntless (99)

History

Singapore
- Name: RSS Courageous
- Builder: ST Engineering (Marine)
- Launched: 9 September 1995
- Commissioned: 5 October 1996
- Identification: Pennant number: 96
- Fate: Damaged in a collision on 3 January 2003; Removed from service in May 2003

General characteristics
- Class & type: Fearless-class patrol vessel
- Displacement: 500 t (490 long tons; 550 short tons)
- Length: 55.0 m (180 ft 5 in)
- Beam: 8.6 m (28 ft 3 in)
- Draught: 2.7 m (8 ft 10 in)
- Propulsion: 2× MTU 12 V 595 TE 90 diesel engines coupled to ZF gear boxes driving 2× Kamewa Waterjets
- Speed: In excess of 20 kn (37 km/h; 23 mph)
- Range: 1,000 nmi (1,900 km) at 15 kn (28 km/h; 17 mph)
- Sensors & processing systems: Search radar: IAI/ELTA EL/M-2228(X) (E/F band); Navigation radar: Kelvin Hughes 1007 (I band); Sonar: Thales Underwater Systems TSM 2362 Gudgeon hull-mounted medium frequency active sonar (first 6 ships); Weapon control: Elbit MSIS optronic director
- Electronic warfare & decoys: ESM: Elisra NS 9010C intercept; Decoys: 2 × GEC Marine Shield III 102 mm sextuple fixed chaff launchers
- Armament: Anti-air: Mistral missile; Anti-submarine: EuroTorp A244/S Mod 1 torpedoes (first 6 ships); Main gun: Oto Melara 76 mm gun; Machine guns: 4× STK 50MG 12.7 mm (0.50 in) HMG

RSS Courageous (96) was a Fearless-class patrol vessel of the Republic of Singapore Navy (RSN). The ship was commissioned in 1996. She was involved in a collision on 3 January 2003 with a merchant vessel ANL Indonesia off Horsburgh Lighthouse (Pedra Branca) which resulted in the death of four female RSN sailors.

== Collision ==
Chart showing the paths of ANL Indonesia and RSS Courageous

RSS Courageous was on patrol off the waters of Pedra Branca on 3 January 2003 and was travelling on the eastbound lane of the Traffic Separation Scheme when she made a turn against the flow of shipping at 2325 hrs local time. A collision with ANL Indonesia subsequently took place at 2335 hrs.

A large-scale search-and-rescue operation was conducted 3–15 January by the Republic of Singapore Navy, the Police Coast Guard and Police and naval units from Indonesia.

Four female sailors were at the stern of the patrol vessel in their sleeping quarters, believed to have been asleep. ANL Indonesia was sailing to South Korea when her bow struck RSS Courageous's rear and sheared off the stern. The sailors were believed to have been killed instantly, and two of their bodies sank into the sea as the merchant ship backed away from the stern of the patrol vessel. Divers later recovered the body of CPL Goh Hui Ling lodged between the bunks after the vessel was put in dry dock at Changi Naval Base. The bodies of 1SG Heng Sock Ling and 1SG Seah Ai Leng washed up on the Indonesian resort of Pulau Bintan and Sebong, north-west of Pulau Bintan on 5 January 2003.

The body of 2SG Chua Bee Lin was never found. Her body was originally believed to have been lodged in the stern of the patrol boat which broke off following the collision and sank on the seabed. A salvage team from Smit International successfully lifted the wreckage on 14 January 2003 but her body was not found.

=== Aftermath ===
In the investigation report released on 4 April 2003 by the Maritime and Port Authority of Singapore, it was revealed that RSS Courageous was under the immediate control of Lieutenant Chua Chue Teng, 23 who was a trainee Officer Of The Watch and was supervised by Lieutenant Ng Keng Yong, 27 at the time of the incident.

The findings of the investigations concluded three key errors of judgment that resulted in the collision:

- The initial alteration of course against the flow of shipping which technically contravened rule 10(b)(i) of the International Regulations for Preventing Collisions at Sea and increased the risk of collision.
- The decision to cross the bow of ANL Indonesia by RSS Courageous which contravened Rule 14 (a) of the International Regulations for Preventing Collisions at Sea.
- The subsequent minor alternations of course to port by RSS Courageous which was unclear to ANL Indonesia.

The two officers were subsequently charged in court under Section 304A Penal Code, for causing death by a negligent act not amounting to culpable homicide and were found guilty and fined SGD$4,700 and SGD$8,000 by District Judge Tan Boon Gin. An appeal was lodged at the High Court of Singapore but was dismissed by Chief Justice Yong Pung How on 13 August 2004.

Six officers from the Singapore Police Coast Guard's PH50 Hammerhead Shark coastal patrol craft were awarded the Police Medal of Valour at the National Day Awards Investiture on 5 November 2003 along with the Minister for Home Affairs Awards for Operational Excellence, a team award for all 39 officers on 3 April 2003.

== Casualties ==
Dead

- 1st Sergeant Seah Ai Leng
- 1st Sergeant Heng Sock Ling
- Corporal Goh Hui Ling

Missing (Presumed Dead)

- 2nd Sergeant Chua Bee Lin
