= Independence-class littoral mission vessel =

Class of Singapore Navy patrol vessel

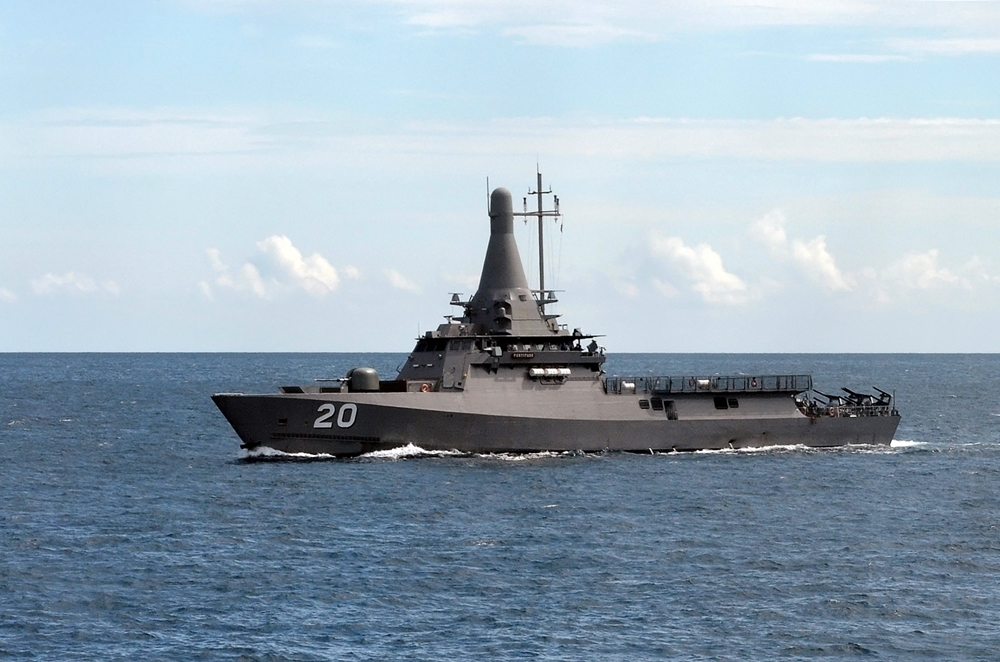
- RSS Fortitude in the Singapore Strait

Class overview
- Name: Independence class
- Builders: ST Marine, Benoi, Singapore
- Operators: Republic of Singapore Navy
- Preceded by: Fearless class
- Built: 2014–2020
- In commission: 2017–present
- Planned: 8
- Completed: 8
- Active: 8

General characteristics
- Type: Patrol vessel
- Displacement: 1,200 tonnes (1,180 long tons; 1,320 short tons)
- Length: 80 m (262 ft 6 in)
- Beam: 12 m (39 ft 4 in)
- Draught: 3 m (9 ft 10 in)
- Propulsion: Combined diesel and diesel (CODAD) arrangement; 4 × MTU 20V 4000 M93L, each rated at 4,300 kW (5,770 shp); Total output: 17,200 kW (23,100 shp)
- Speed: Maximum: 27 knots (50.0 km/h; 31.1 mph); Cruising: 18 kn (33.3 km/h; 20.7 mph)
- Range: 3,000 nautical miles (5,560 km)
- Complement: Up to 23 baseline crew, up to 30 mission crew
- Sensors & processing systems: Search radar: Thales NS 100 S-band multi-function active electronically scanned array radar; Navigation radar: Kelvin Hughes SharpEye; Fire control: Sagem Gun Fire-control System (GFS); 1 × STELOP COMPASS D
- Electronic warfare & decoys: STELOP 360° all-round surveillance
- Armament: Guns: Oto Melara 76mm Super Rapid gun, to be replaced with the OTO Melara 76mm gun with STRALES system; 2 × Hitrole 12.7 mm (0.50 in) RCWS; 1 × 25mm Mk38 Mod2 Typhoon Weapon Station Stabilised Gun; Anti-Air: 12 × MICA VL; Non-lethal: 2 x Long-Range Acoustic Device 500 Xtreme (LRAD500X)
- Aviation facilities: Helicopter deck for: 1x medium-lift helicopter or 1x Veloce 60 UAS
- Notes: Sources:

The Independence-class littoral mission vessel (LMV) is a class of eight surface platforms from the Republic of Singapore Navy. The eight ships form the second flotilla of the navy.

== Development ==
On 30 January 2013, MINDEF awarded ST Engineering a contract for the design and build of eight new vessels to replace the Fearless-class patrol vessels. ST Engineering announced that the group’s marine arm, ST Marine would be the lead system integrator and build the eight vessels at its Singapore Benoi Yard while the group’s electronics arm, ST Electronics, would supply the core combat systems and combat system integration solutions. The first vessel was planned for delivery in 2016 and all eight vessels will be fully operational by 2020. The keel for the first vessel was laid at ST Marine's Benoi Yard on 11 September 2014, officiated by Permanent Secretary (Defence) Chan Yeng Kit. A naming contest was held by MINDEF from 12 February 2015, and the winning names were announced by the Minister for Defence Dr Ng Eng Hen on 15 May 2015.

== Design ==
The Littoral Mission Vessel (LMV) was jointly designed by Saab Kockums AB and ST Marine with Singapore's Defence Science and Technology Agency (DSTA) as the overall manager and systems integrator and was derived from Saab Kockum's FLEXpatrol multi-mission patrol vessel. The design of the LMV was guided by two specific requirements. Due to declining birth rates, manpower had been a critical concern for the Singapore Armed Forces and the design reflects attempts to increase the efficiency of a reduced manning crew from 30 to 23. This was achieved through increased levels of automation and remote monitoring. Another key feature is the Integrated Command Centre which combines the ship's bridge, combat information centre (CIC), and machinery control spaces. The other requirement reflected in the design of the LMV is the need to handle multiple roles, from low intensity conflicts to humanitarian assistance and disaster relief (HADR) operations. The requirement is met through the ability to dynamically reconfigure the LMV through containerised mission packages. The LMV is also equipped with a unique, twin stern slipways from Palfinger Marine for the launch and recovery of RHIBs.

In 2025, the RSN begun deployment of ST Engineering's Veloce 60 Unmanned Aerial System on the Independence-class LMV, which has an endurance of up to 14 hours, enhancing the ship's surveillance capabilities.

To counter emerging threats arising from unmanned aerial systems, the RSN has begun upgrading the Independence-class LMV with the Strales 76mm Guided Gun in order to increase low-cost effectiveness against fast-moving targets.. As of March 2026, RSS Justice and RSS Independence are the only vessels seen with the upgraded STRALES system.

== Ships in class ==
Ship	Pennant number	Builder	Laid down	Launched	Commissioned	Status
RSS Independence	15	ST Marine	11 September 2014	3 July 2015	5 May 2017	Active, in service
RSS Sovereignty	16	ST Marine	14 May 2015	16 April 2016	14 November 2017	Active, in service
RSS Unity	17	ST Marine	26 November 2015	13 October 2016	14 November 2017	Active, in service
RSS Justice	18	ST Marine	26 May 2016	18 March 2017	26 September 2018	Active, in service
RSS Indomitable	19	ST Marine	11 November 2016	23 September 2017	26 September 2018	Active, in service
RSS Fortitude	20	ST Marine	26 May 2017	24 March 2018	31 January 2020	Active, in service
RSS Dauntless	21	ST Marine	20 October 2017	18 August 2018	31 January 2020	Active, in service
RSS Fearless	22	ST Marine	April 2018	26 January 2019	31 January 2020	Active, in service

== See also ==
- Littoral combat ship
