= Maritime Security Command =

Operational command of the Republic of Singapore Navy

- Badge of the Maritime Security Command
- Founded: January 1988; 38 years ago (as the Coastal Command); 19 January 2009; 17 years ago (as the Maritime Security Command)
- Country: Singapore
- Branch: Republic of Singapore Navy
- Role: Coastal defence
- Part of: Singapore Armed Forces
- Motto: Frontline 247

Commanders
- Commanding Officer: COL Ng Xun Xi

The Maritime Security Command (MARSEC Command) is one of five operational commands of the Republic of Singapore Navy (RSN), responsible for building up, training and maintaining the capabilities of RSN platforms that are deployed primarily for maritime security operations. It was first established as the Coastal Command (COSCOM) in January 1988, before its restructuring in January 2009.

== Difference between Maritime Security Task Force and Maritime Security Command ==
The Maritime Security Task Force/Maritime Security Command is a formation within the Republic of Singapore Navy. The MSTF is the task force in charge of maritime security operations, while Maritime Security Command is tasked to raise, train and sustain maritime security capabilities.

== Organisation Structure ==
Maritime Security Command comprises four flotillas.

The 2nd Flotilla is responsible for building up and maintaining the operational readiness of the Littoral Mission Vessels and its crew, which are deployed to respond to maritime security threats and maritime incidents to safeguard Singapore’s waters and ensure that our sea lines of communication remain open.

The 6th Flotilla is responsible for mine countermeasures, and leads the development of unmanned capabilities of surface and underwater craft for the RSN. The flotilla operates the Bedok-class mine countermeasures vessels, and unmanned surface vessels (USVs) for mine countermeasures and coastal defence. With the expected reduction in manpower by 2030, USVs are a critical force multiplier for the RSN.

The 9th Flotilla is responsible for the training and deployment of security troopers, sea soldiers and system operators, and will build capabilities for the seaward and landward defence of the RSN’s naval bases and installations.

The Maritime and Security Response Flotilla (MSRF) was inaugurated on 26 January 2021 with four Sentinel-class maritime security and response vessels (MSRV) and two maritime security and response tugboats (MSRT), as part of the restructured MARSEC Command.

== History ==
=== 1988–2009: Coastal Command ===
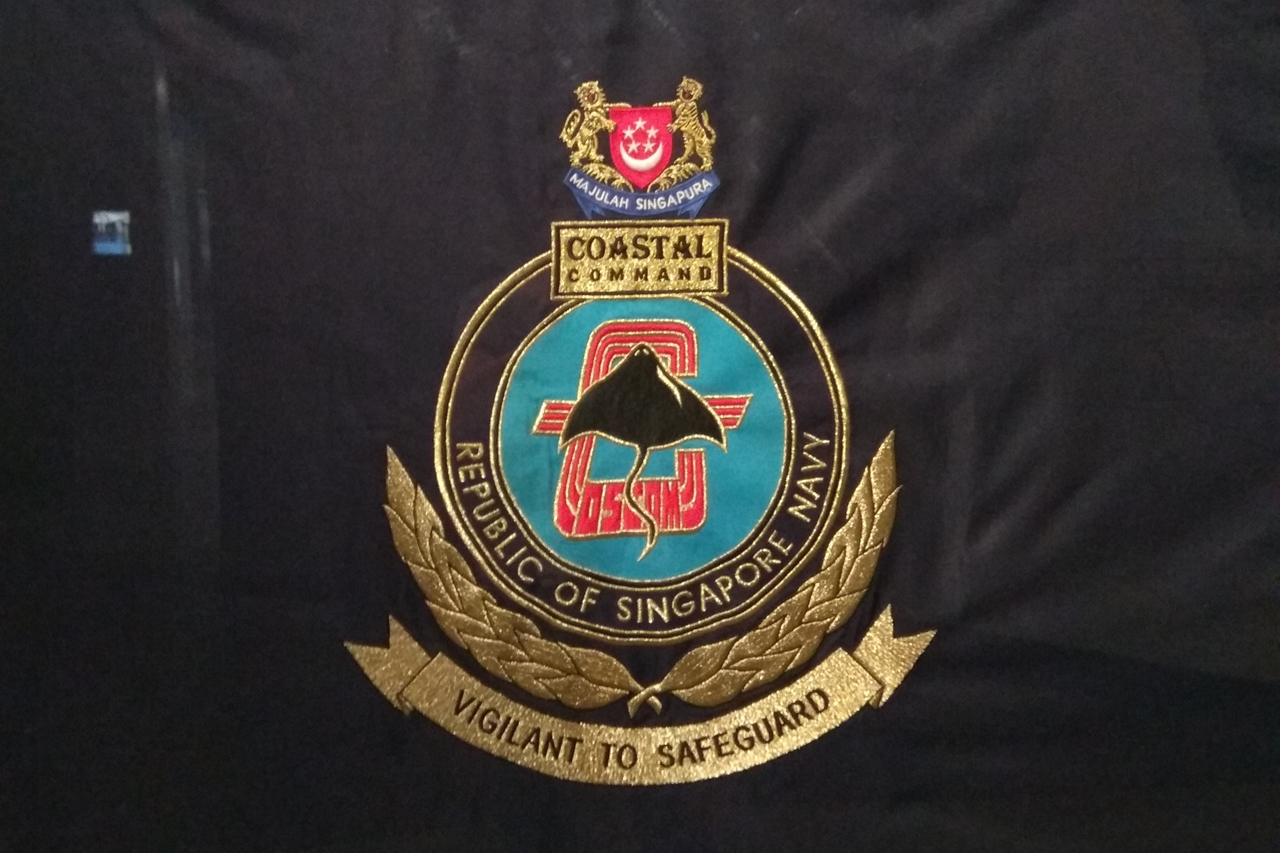
Former flag of the Coastal Command (1988–2009)

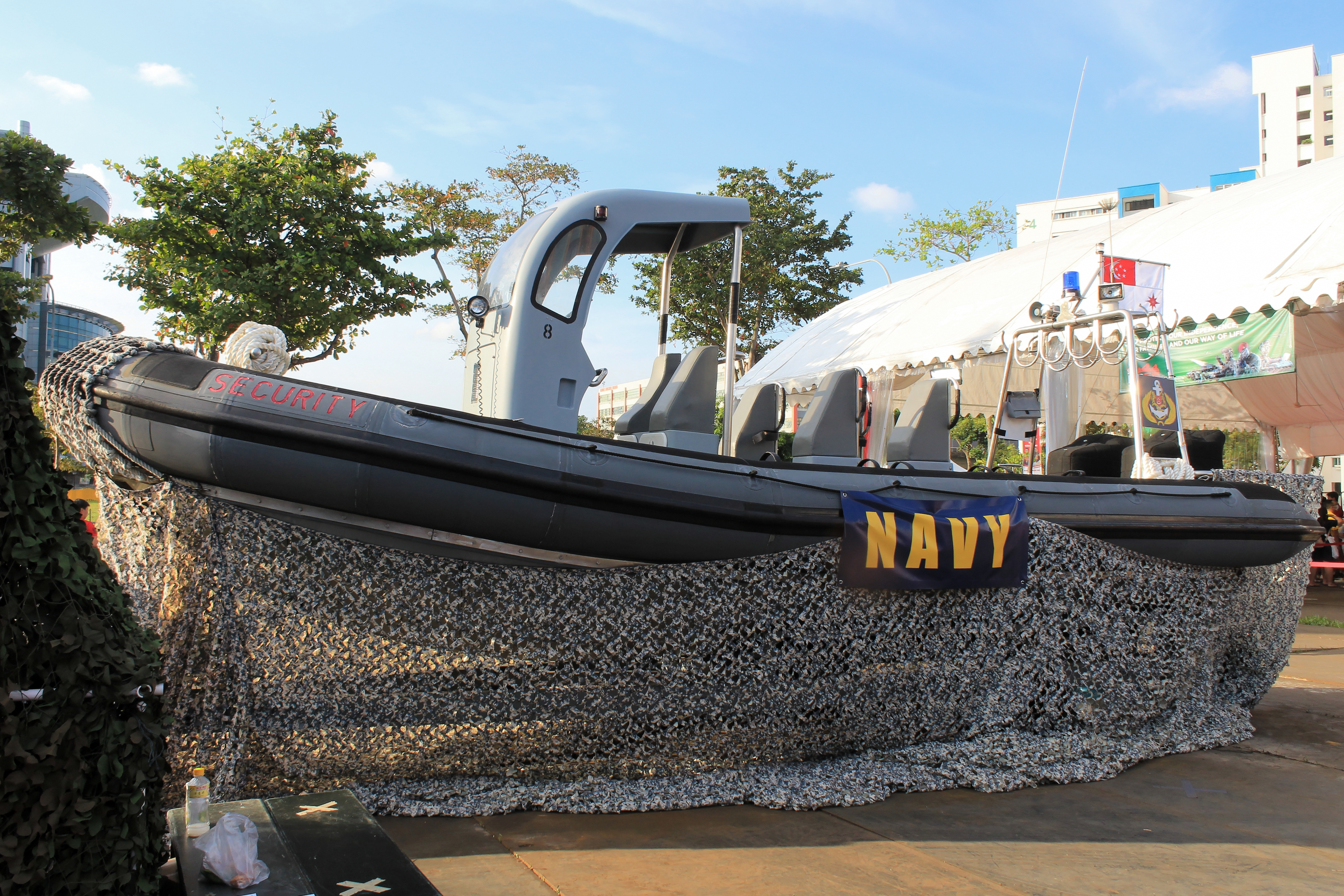
RHIB used by the Ninth Flotilla
