= Police Coast Guard =

Maritime police agency of Singapore

Police Coast Guard Polis Pengawal Pantai (Malay) 警察海岸保衛處 (Chinese) காவல்துறை கடலோர காவல்படை (Tamil)
- Patch of the Police Coast Guard

- Emblem of the Singapore Police Force

- Racing stripe

- Ensign
- Abbreviation: PCG
- Motto: Setia dan Bakti (Loyalty and Service)

Agency overview
- Formed: 13 February 1993

Jurisdictional structure
- Operations jurisdiction: Singapore
- Legal jurisdiction: Singapore territorial waters
- Governing body: Singapore Police Force

Operational structure
- Headquarters: 11 Brani Way Singapore 098658
- Agency executives: SAC Ang Eng Seng, Commander Police Coast Guard; DAC Daniel Seah Kah Weng, Deputy Commander

The Police Coast Guard (PCG) is a division of the Singapore Police Force that combines the functions of marine police and coast guard in Singapore. Its duties include the law enforcement and search and rescue operations in collaboration with the Maritime and Port Authority of Singapore and the Immigration and Checkpoints Authority. It is headquartered at Brani Regional Base on Pulau Brani.

== History ==
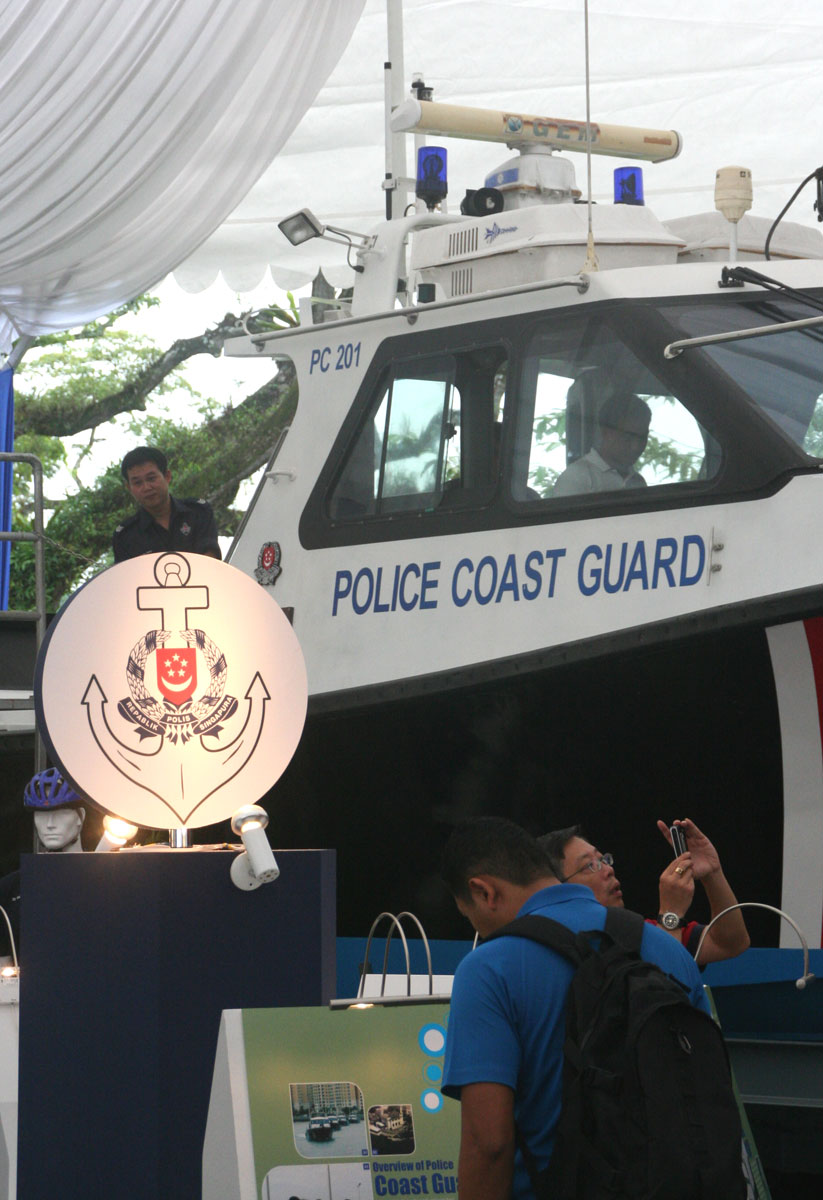
Booth of the Police Coast Guard at the Police Carnival 2006 showing its old logo with a PC boat in the background

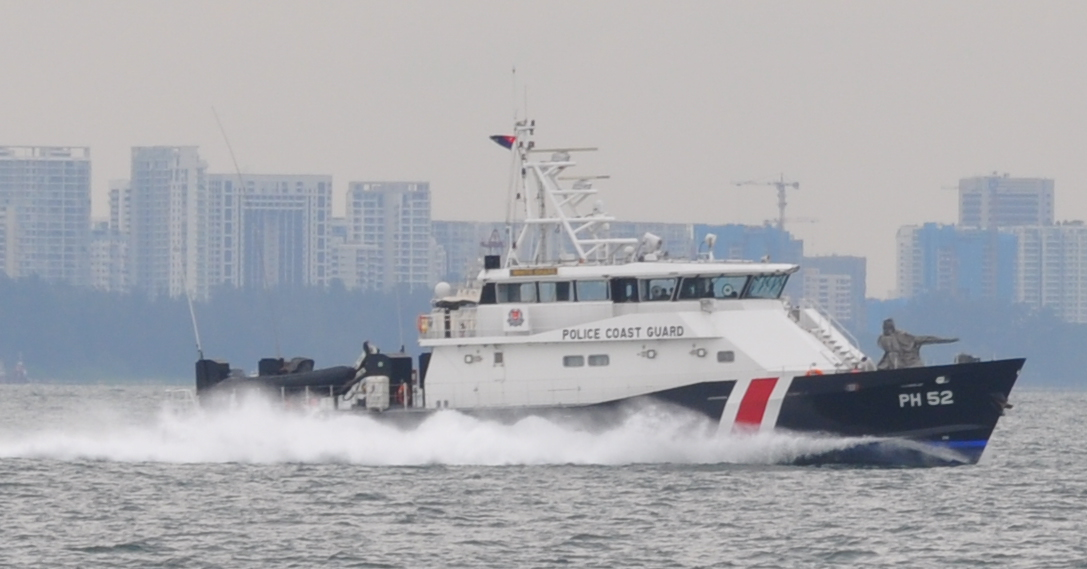
PCG's "White Shark" PH52, a 35 m-long Coastal Patrol Craft

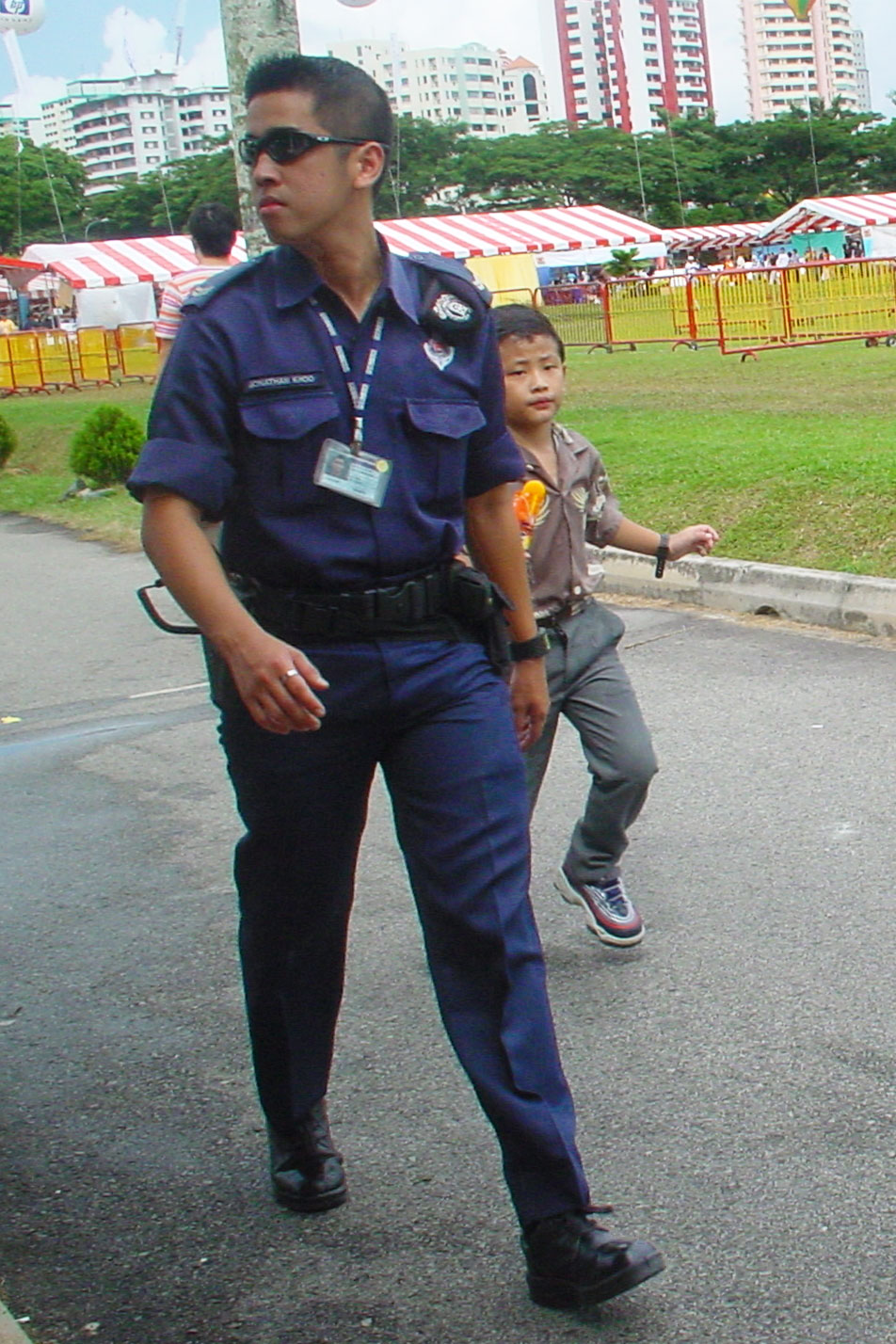
Police Coast Guard officer at the Police Week Carnival 2002, donning the old PCG uniform which was phased out in mid-2006

Given Singapore's standing as a trading port since its founding in 1819, problems of piracy had accompanied its early maritime history until the 1840s when Temenggong Daeng Ibrahim and his son, Sultan Abu Bakar of Johor, openly supported the British efforts to fight piracy. In 1866, the police's maritime operations were formally established with the building of a floating police station. Dedicated police patrol boats began patrolling the waters around the colony.

In 1916, the Marine Branch was set up, before being established as a separate unit in 1924 and renamed as the Marine Police. The new unit built its first headquarters near Cavenagh Bridge along the Singapore River, and had a fleet of about 26 boats and 238 officers. During the Japanese Occupation of Singapore, all vessels of the Marine Police were confiscated by the Japanese forces. After the war, the Marine Police saw rapid growth with the establishment of sub-bases at Tanjong Kling, Pulau Ubin and Pulau Tekong by 1951. In 1952, the fleet was boosted to 68 as a result of a reorganisation of the Police Force, and rose to 70 during the Konfrontasi with Indonesia in the 1960s in light of the increased operational needs.

With the attainment of independence for Singapore in 1965, the unit was upgraded in light of increased responsibilities for the new nation. It relocated its headquarters to the new Kallang Regional Base at Kallang Basin in 1970, and became known as the Marine Division.

The Marine Division underwent a major restructuring and was renamed as the Police Coast Guard on 13 February 1993, given its expanded roles in marine security responsibilities and capabilities, including preventing the intrusion of illegal migrants and foreign government vessels, and the guarding of the Horsburgh Lighthouse on the disputed island of Pedra Branca in the Singapore Straits. The PCG officiated the reorganisation of its operations into three squadrons, namely the Interceptor Squadron, the Port Squadron and the Coastal Patrol Squadron on 7 May 1993 and launched the Special Task Squadron (STS) on 22 January 1997.

On 20 March 2006, it relocated its headquarters to its current location at Brani Regional Base, due to the planned damming of the Marina Bay and Kallang Basin. The new Police Coast Guard headquarters at Pulau Brani was officially opened on 8 February 2007 by the Minister for Home Affairs, DPM Wong Kan Seng.

=== Incidents and accidents ===
- On 6 December 1984, police boat PX-5 left its base in Jurong for routine patrol. En route, SC Abdul Rashid Bin Mohammed Said shot SGT Chin Ah Kow in the head and threw his body overboard. PC Wahid Bin Ahmad and PC Shamsudin Bin Haji Ali were forced off the boat, and subsequently found near Pulau Senang, by which time PC Wahid had drowned and PC Shamsudin was the sole survivor. SGT Chin's body was never found.
- On 28 December 1999, petrol bombs hurled from an escaping speedboat hit a police boat off Sembawang, although no one was hurt. The speedboat was attempting to smuggle in illegal migrants, and was later captured by the police.
- On 3 January 2003, six officers led by DSP1 Tan Wee Wah Stephen aboard PH50 (Hammerhead Shark) assisted in the rescue of crew on the stricken Republic of Singapore Navy ship RSS Courageous after a collision with a merchant ship, ANL Indonesia. All officers involved in the rescue were subsequently awarded with the Pingat Keberanian Polis.
- On 11 September 2004, a collision between a PCG boat and a cabin cruiser out on a fishing trip resulted in the death of a 47-year-old Prisons officer. His partner and colleague was rescued.
- In March 2006, a PCG craft PT34 rammed an outrigger canoe with six crew members from the Singapore Paddle Club, resulting in injuries to three canoe crew members.
- On 13 April 2007, two Interceptor Craft of the Special Task Squadron were on ambush duty off Tuas in the vicinity of Tuas Jetty, when a speedboat with six illegal immigrants and cartons of cigarettes intruded into Singapore's territorial waters at about 9:30 pm. The speedboat sped off when approached by the police, resulting in a five-minute chase which ended with a collision between one of the craft and the speedboat near Pulau Merambong. PK 50 capsized, while the speedboat was completely wrecked. Two officers were rescued from the scene within minutes with minor injuries, while SI Mohd Khalid Bin Muhamad, 41, and SSGT Heah Khim Han, 29, who were trapped in the steering compartment, were missing. Their bodies were found on 14 April 2007 at about 8:15 am. Three passengers on the intruding vessels were also rescued, and a fourth man was found dead. The rest of the passengers were still missing. The two officers were the first casualties for the STS and the PCG since the latter's evolution from the Marine Division in 1993. It was also the first instance where a police boat capsized and the first police fatalities as a result of a high speed chase. Both officers were posthumously promoted to the rank of Senior Station Inspector and Senior Staff Sergeant respectively.

== Organisation ==
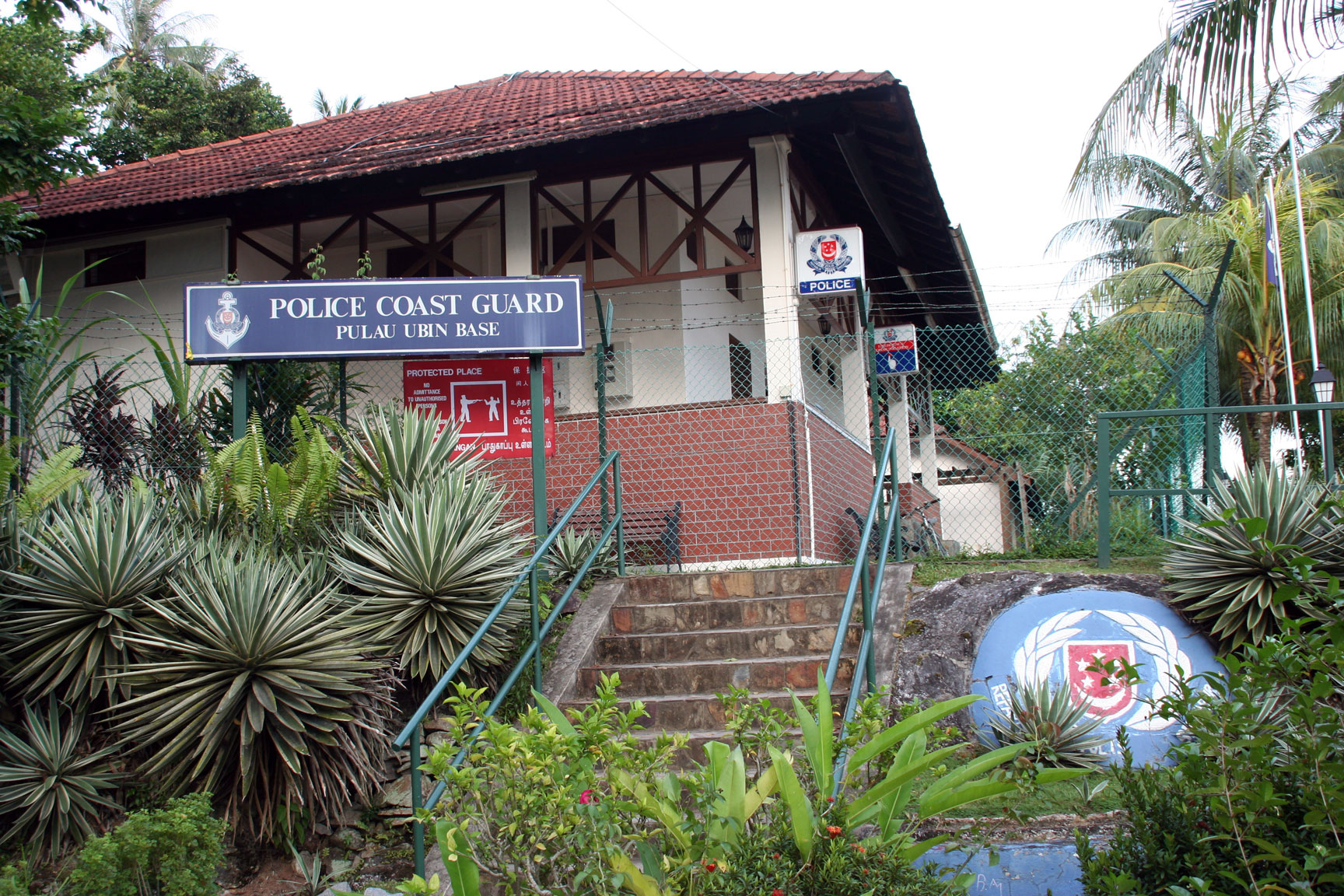
The Police Coast Guard's Pulau Ubin Base.

The Police Coast Guard is currently headed by Senior Assistant Commissioner (SAC) Ang Eng Seng, with Deputy Assistant Commissioner (DAC) Daniel Seah Kah Weng as deputy commander (DY Commander). It operates from four regional bases all located on the coastlines of the main island, namely the Brani Regional Base to the south, the Gul Regional Base to the west, the Lim Chu Kang Regional Base to the north and the Loyang Regional Base to the east. It also maintains a small police post on Pulau Ubin. Each of these regional bases are similarly organised to the Neighbourhood Police Centres of the SPF's Land Divisions and conduct patrols and checks within their respective maritime sectors of Singapore's territorial waters.

The entire PCG fleet is organised into three main squadrons. The Interceptor Squadron, located at both the Lim Chu Kang and Loyang regional bases, is outfitted with PC-class high-speed patrol-craft able to control, track and prevent the movement of illegal immigrants and intruding vessels all along the Straits of Johor. The Port Squadron, located at both the Gul and Brani regional bases, is equipped with the newer generation of PT-class patrol-boats (previously together with the now-obsolete PX-class patrol-vessels) and have the primary task of ensuring the security and safety of the waters of Singapore's port by responding to criminal and/or safety incidents as well as projecting a major police presence in STW. The third squadron, the Coastal Patrol Squadron (CPS), operates the largest of the PCG fleet, the PH-class Coastal Patrol Craft (CPC), to secure the far-sea passages of the eastern approaches into STW (from the southwestern edge of the South China Sea) and ensure safe passage for all legitimate users. They are also tasked with protecting the Horsburgh Lighthouse on Pedra Branca in the vicinity, together with the Republic of Singapore Navy (RSN).

The PCG has an elite unit known as the Special Task Squadron (STS), which can be activated to conduct high-risk operations where high speed pursuits and increased firepower are deemed necessary to achieve their objectives. The unit played an instrumental role in the capture of one of the three armed robbers who infiltrated into Singapore by landing on Pulau Tekong in March 2004.

In June 2017, PCG introduced a new front-line unit trained in counter-assault skills and to respond to terrorist attacks in Singapore's territorial waters. This unit is known as the Emergency Response Force (ERF), similar to the Emergency Response Team (ERT) of the SPF's Land Divisions (now merged under ERT) and the first batch of ERF-trained officers started their maritime counter-terrorism patrols in that same month. In addition, the ERF is trained in boarding vessels ranging from small tugboats to large merchant ships to neutralise any terrorist or serious criminal activity aboard and to search for dangerous and/or explosive cargo, goods or items. It is expected that in the near future, all PCG officers are going to be trained as ERF members in view of increasing terrorist activity around the world, especially if it centers around Singapore.

== Operations ==
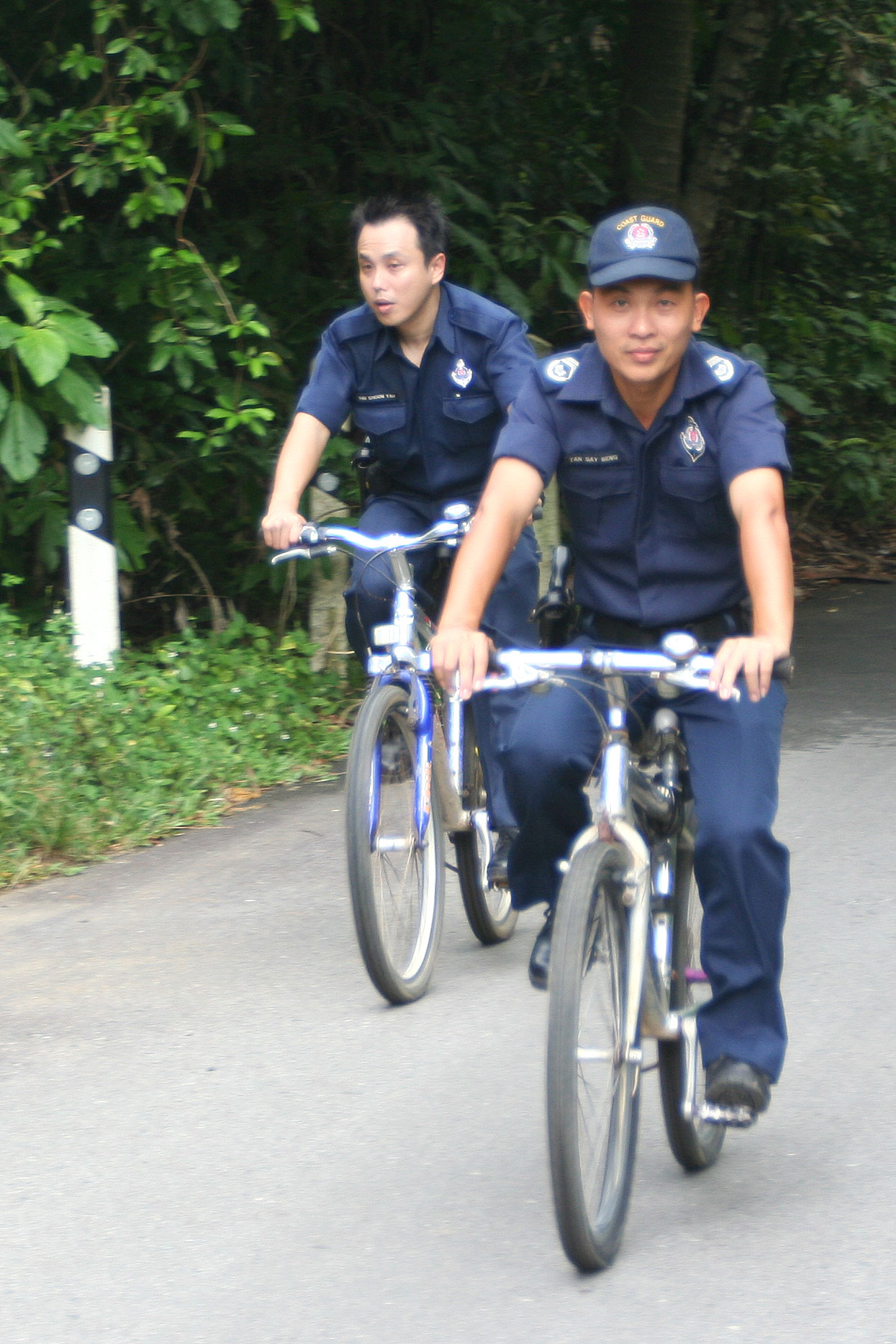
Police Coast Guard officers also conduct land patrols on several of Singapore's major islands, as these officers are performing such duties on Pulau Ubin.

The Police Coast Guard conducts 24-hour round-the-clock patrols in Singapore's territorial waters from its four regional bases, in an area of more than 200 square nautical miles (700 km²). It is also responsible for maintaining law and order on most of Singapore's islands, except those which are directly accessible by road from the main island, such as Jurong Island and Sentosa, although it provides them protection and security via seaborne patrols offshore.

While piracy was the main source of concern leading to the establishment of the Marine Police way back in the early part of the 20th century, it has become almost a minor issue today with practically few to no cases of piracy in Singapore's territorial waters in the last decade. Crimes on Singapore's offshore islands or in its territorial waters are also markedly low.

=== Maritime Border Control ===
The control of illegal migrants entering Singapore's waters has become one of the most visible roles of the PCG, however, aided in part by constant media reports on such arrests. On 17 August 2006, its arrest of 22 illegal migrants in four separate incidents was touted as the largest number arrested by the PCG in a day by the media. While the number of intrusions has been drastically reduced in recent years with the acquisition of radar and other sophisticated night-vision equipment, the attraction of Singapore as a migrant destination continues to pose a constant operational challenge to the PCG. In addition, the PCG also has to deal with the lesser but daily issue of small-scale illegal fishing and similar activities in Singapore's waters from bordering Malaysian and Indonesian fishing communities.

In a further bid to thwart illegal immigrants from landing on Singapore's shores, the PCG has erected physical barriers in the form of high-fencing topped with sharp razor-wire and fitted with electrical motion-sensors along critical areas of the shoreline where such intrusions are common, including in Lim Chu Kang, on Pulau Punggol Barat, Pulau Ubin and the Western Live Firing Area on Singapore's northwestern coast. Coastal surveillance cameras are also fitted along these fences to observe any suspicious or illegal movement. By the end of December in 2003, the total length of coastal fencing had reached 24.7 kilometres, although there were some protests over the potential environmental hazards the fencing may pose to natural amphibious species, particularly on Pulau Ubin and Singapore's northwestern shoreline. The PCG attempted to allay these fears by informing that the fencing is constructed in such a manner to allow small animals to pass below it safely.

Included in the bid to thwart illegal immigrants, the PCG has employed Unmanned Surface Vessels (USVs) in late-2017 to conduct maritime patrols and these robot-equipped boats can help in easing manpower issues after their field-test and the speed is 30 knots (55 km/h). The USVs have two versions in length; one is 9 metres long and the other is 16 metres long. They lack any armament, unlike current PCG boats, but are still equipped with searchlights, a radar, sensors, electro-optic cameras and loudspeakers, as well as an on-board automatic fire-extinguishing system. Besides USVs, the PCG is also rolling out the use of small police drones to assist in its checks on vessels difficult to board, such as loaded barges or vessels with low draft.

=== Terrorism ===
The heightened global security alert following the 2001 September 11 terror attacks necessitated additional attention paid to preventing possible terrorist attacks by sea, a possibility underscored during the revelation of the Singapore embassies attack plot by the local Jemaah Islamiyah Islamic extremist group in December 2001, where it was revealed that Changi Naval Base was the subject of surveillance by them. There were also possible plans to bomb the United States Navy ships using the narrow channel between Pulau Tekong and Changi on the northeastern coast of Singapore. In response to these threats, the PCG stepped up routine checks on vessels in Singapore's territorial waters, in particular on passenger ferries returning from regional destinations. Since late-2004, PCG officers have given additional training in the areas of boarding vessels for this purpose and are equipped with skills in the detection of explosives, drugs and fraudulent documents, courtesy of the Immigration and Checkpoints Authority's (ICA) provision of much assistance and training towards PCG in such an endeavour.

=== Search and Rescue ===
The PCG also engages in search-and-rescue operations at sea on a regular basis and provides crucial assistance in recovery efforts offshore, such as the recovery of the stricken USS John S. McCain in Singapore's waters in 2017.

== Manpower ==
The Police Coast Guard has a strength of over 1,000 personnel, making it one of the largest operational units in the Singapore Police Force. It has traditionally drawn its manpower from a common pool of officers as is the case with land divisions and most other line units. The majority were posted to the unit immediately after basic police training, while the rest were transferred from other divisions or units. In recent years, it offered an option for aspiring regular officers to apply directly to join the unit, thus needing only to attend common courses at the Home Team Academy before receiving specialised marine training for immediate posting within the unit upon graduation.

Due to the specialised nature of the job, officers with the PCG are less likely to transfer to other operational units. Senior Officers in the PCG are, however, usually posted there as part of their cyclical rotation among staff and line units after their mandatory initial posting as Investigation Officers, typically for a short stint of about two to five years. The unit's manpower is supplemented national servicemen, as well as officers from the Volunteer Special Constabulary.

== Uniforms ==
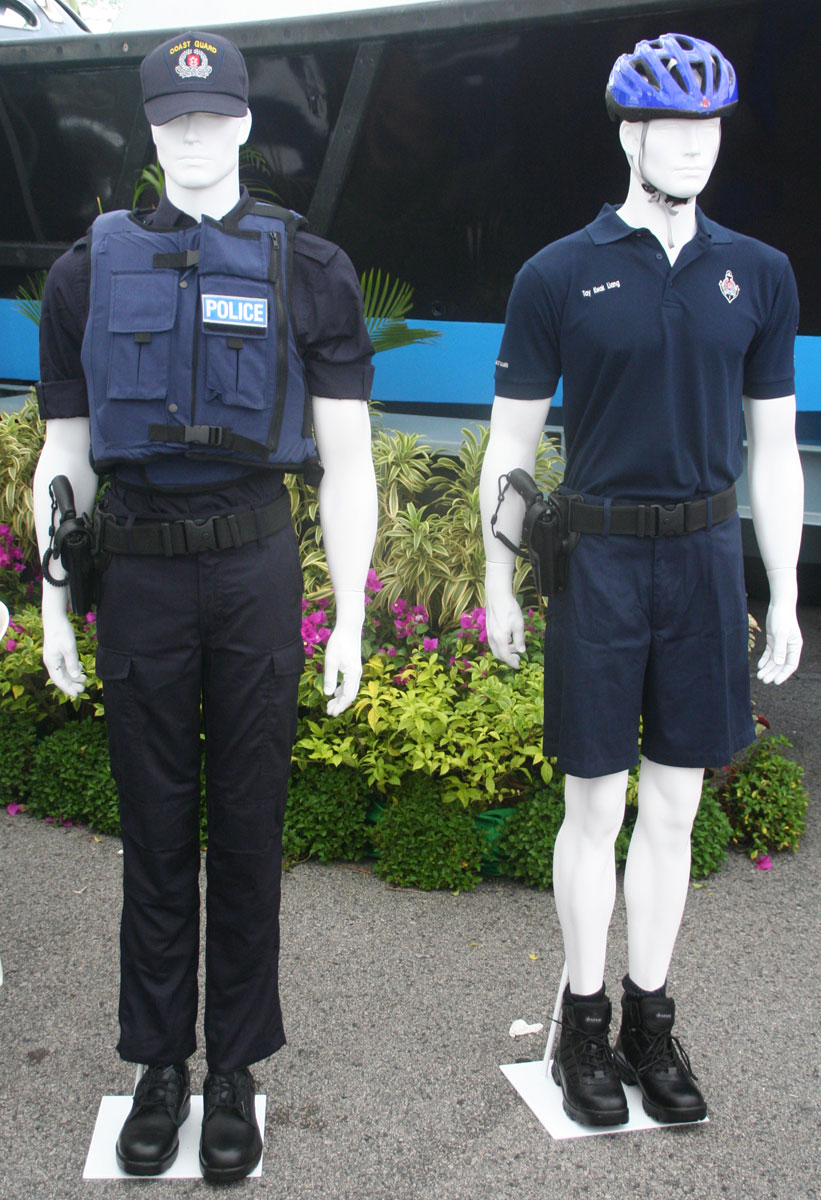
New uniforms of the Police Coast Guard on display at the Police Carnival 2006

The evolution of uniforms worn by the Police Coast Guard largely mirrors that for the land-based divisions, with its earliest uniforms reflecting British heritage and influence. Early uniforms are based on that of navy sailors, consisting of an all-white attire of long-sleeved shirts and shorts. Officers wore the same khaki-based uniforms which were introduced in the land divisions from 1890, before switching to the Dacron blue uniform in 1969 along with the rest of the police force.

When the Marine Police was reorganised and renamed as the Police Coast Guard in 1993, the uniform was also changed to the Combat (or No. 4) Uniform. This uniform consisted of a long-sleeved shirt and long pants made of a slightly tougher polyester, and does away with almost all metal parts via the use of Velcro and plastic buttons. They don a blue beret, but are permitted to wear a baseball cap while on operational duties. Footwear is in the form of lace-up leather shoes with non-slip soles. Unlike the Combat Uniform worn by other units in the police force, the uniform adopted hidden plastic buttons to avoid entanglements, and does away with garters since shoes, and not boots, are worn to allow rapid removal should water entry be required.

In May 2005, the island Patrol Uniform was introduced, consisting of a helmet, dark blue polo top and Bermudas for officers performing bicycle patrol duties on Pulau Ubin. These were introduced to project a softer image on the island where recreational activities abound, and to provide greater comfort for the officers in the humid outdoor weather.

As part of a force-wide review of the police uniforms, the PCG adopted the new combat uniform similar to that currently worn by the Special Operations Command, albeit with a darker shade of blue. While they were introduced to overcome existing limitations of the current uniform, such as allowing for less hindrance in body movement due to the more relaxed fit, and its non-flammable properties, they met with opposition from some officers who feel it projects the wrong image to the general public, including its "technician" look. Officers began to don the new combat uniform from 21 August 2006.

== Current fleet ==
There are currently eight types of boats utilised by the PCG, namely the Command Boat, the Coastal Patrol Craft (CPC), two types of PT boats, the PC class Patrol Craft, the PK class Interceptor Craft and PJ Class for the Special Task Squadron, and the Marina Reservoir Patrol boats for localised patrols, particularly up smaller rivers and canals.

=== Command Boat (PT Class) ===
The two Command Boats in operation are slightly larger versions of the regular 3rd generation PT patrol craft, and built by Asia-Pacific Geraldton in 1998.

Ships
- Manta Ray (PT20)
- Eagle Ray (PT30)
Length
20 metres
Beam
6.3 metres
Draft
1 metre
Speed
30 knots (60 km/h)
Weapons
2x General Purpose Machine Guns

=== New Coastal Patrol Craft ===
In 2006, the PCG signed a contract with Damen Shipyard to build 10 specially designed boats, the Damen StanPatrol 3507 to replace its aging Coastal Patrol Craft. The first vessel PH51 Mako Shark was commissioned on 3 February 2009.

Ships
- Hammerhead Shark (PH50)
- Mako Shark (PH51)
- White Shark (PH52)
- Blue Shark (PH53)
- Tiger Shark (PH54)
- Basking Shark (PH55)
- Sandbar Shark (PH56)
- Thresher Shark (PH57)
- Whitetip Shark (PH58)
- Blacktip Shark (PH59)

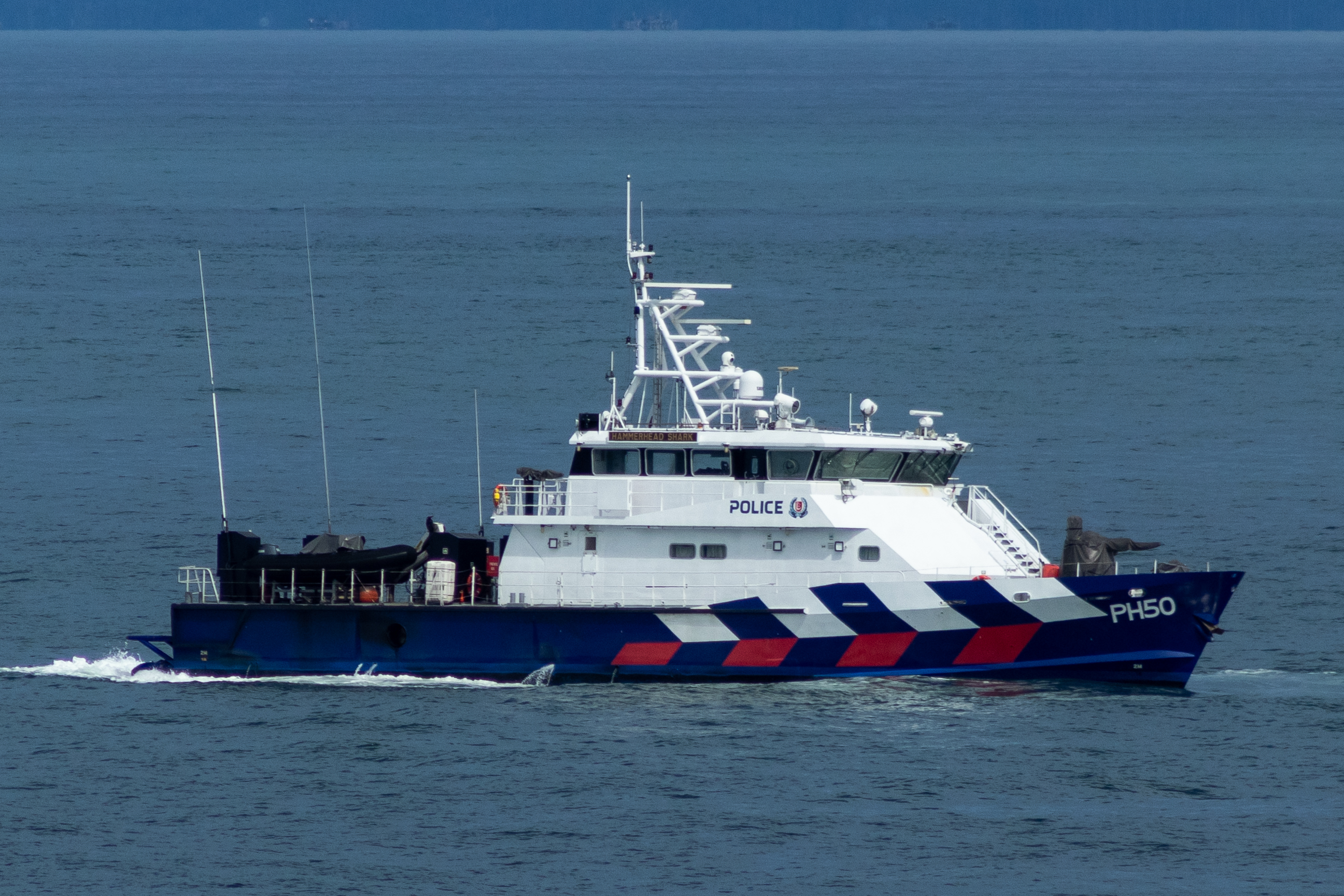
Hammerhead Shark (PH50)

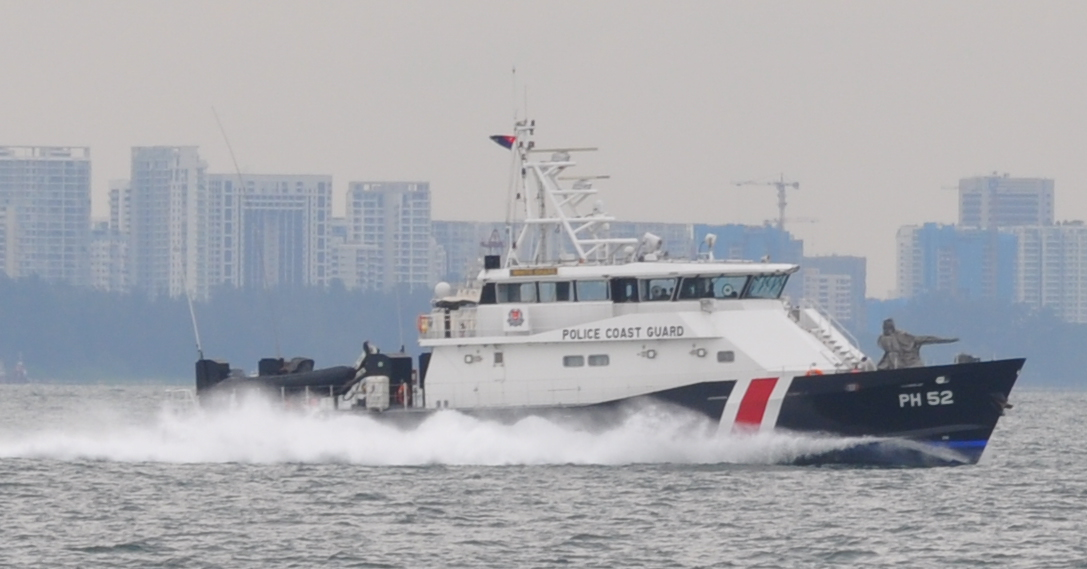
White Shark (PH52)

Displacement
140 tonnes
Length
35 metres
Beam
7.16 metres
Draft
1.66 metres
Speed
35 knots (65 km/h)
Propulsion
3 x MTU 16V4000 M71 diesels 2465 kW (3305 hp) @ 2000rpm, with 3 x HamiltonJet Model HM721 and MECS control, Reintjes VLJ 930 gearbox, 3 x Caterpillar C4.4 diesel
Sensor
Sperry Marine, STELOP COMPASS electro-optics
Weapons
1× Mk 25-II Rafael Typhoon weapon system/25mm Bushmaster chain gun and 2× CIS 50 12.7 mm machine guns
Small Arms
Carbine, HK5 & Pistol.

=== Patrol Craft (3rd Generation, PT Class) ===
The third generation of Patrol Craft were introduced in 1998, with 18 built in 1999 and another seven in 2000. They are the Stingray 18WJ Class manufactured by Strategic Marine. At a top speed of 40 knots (74 km/h), they were 10 knots (19 km/h) faster than the older PT class boats in the PCG when they were officially launched on 29 January 2000 Odd-numbered craft are based in Gul Base.

Ships
- Angler Ray (PT21)
- Bat Ray (PT22)
- Bull Ray (PT23)
- Butterfly Ray (PT24)
- Cownose Ray (PT25)
- Starry Ray (PT26)
- Electric Ray (PT27)
- Flynose Ray (PT28)
- Flying Ray (PT29)
- Giant Reef Ray (PT31)
- River Ray (PT32)
- Roughtail Ray (PT33)
- Sandy Ray (PT34)
- Shovelnose Ray (PT35)
- Spotted Ray (PT36)
- Sting Ray (PT37)
- Thornback Ray (PT38)
- Torpedo Ray (PT39)
- Marbled Ray (PT61)
- Motoro Ray (PT62)
- Black Ray (PT63)
- Jaguar Ray (PT64)
- Flower Ray (PT65)
- Fiddler Ray (PT66)
- Starfish Ray (PT67)

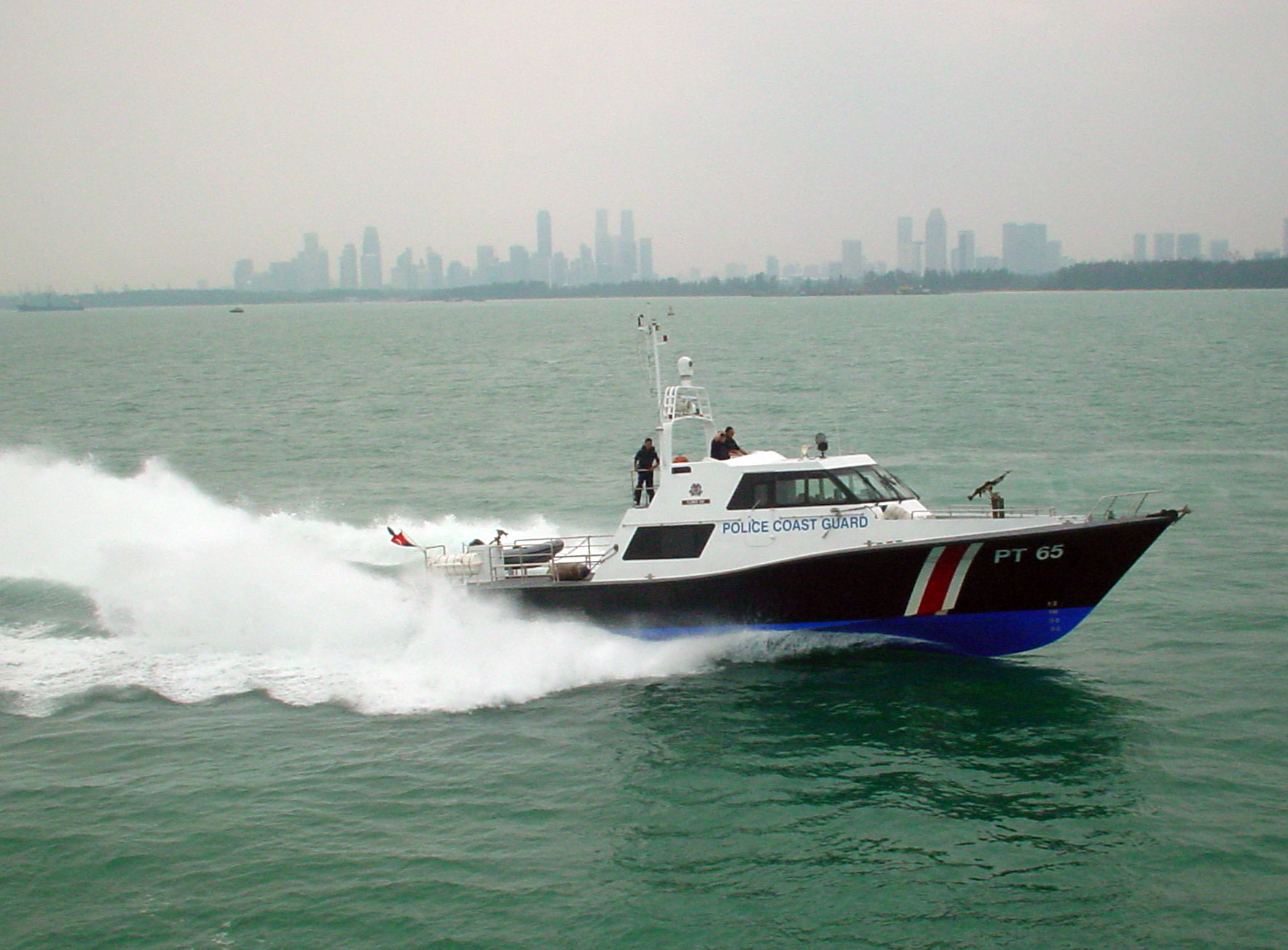
A third generation Patrol Craft, Flower Ray (PT65), conducting a sea-rescue demonstration

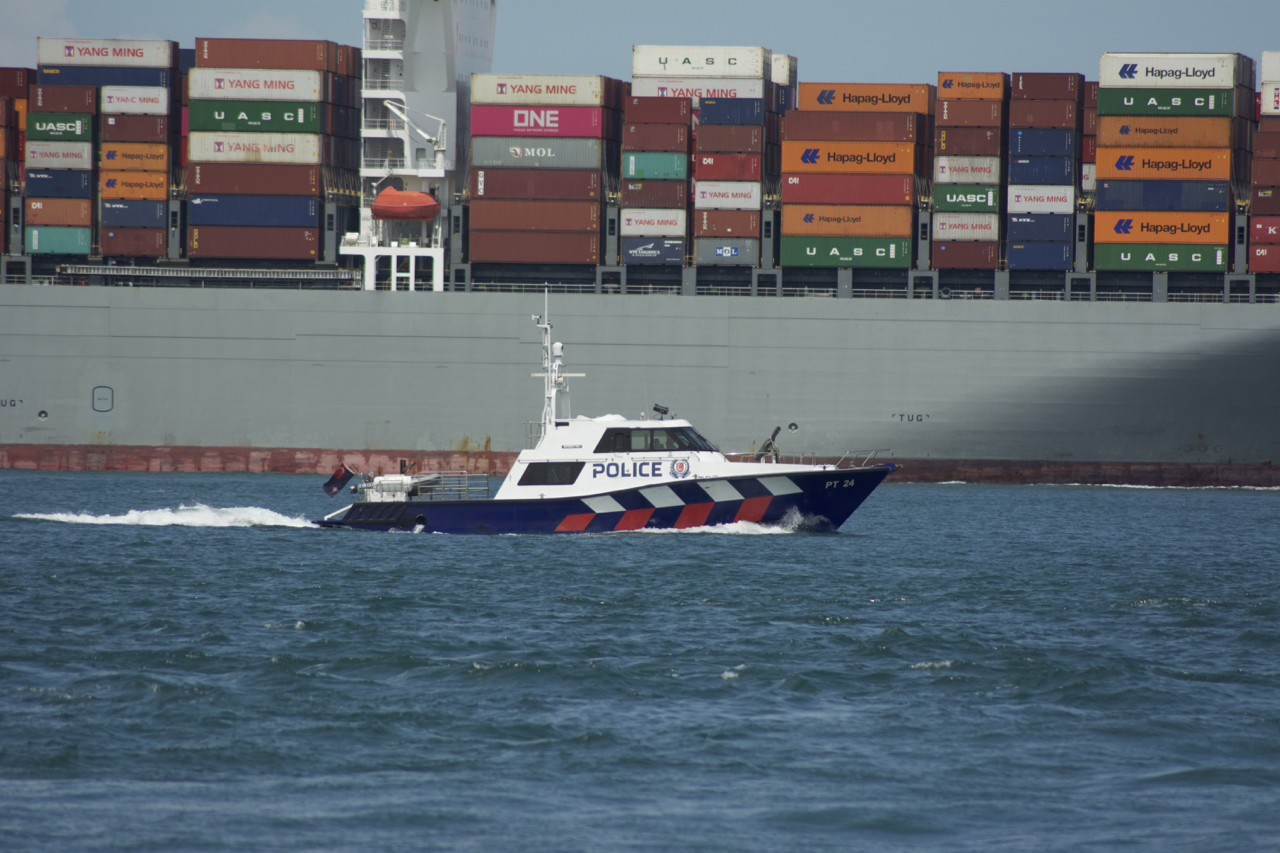
Butterfly Ray (PT24) off Kusu Island in 2019

Length
18 metres
Beam
5.4 metres
Draft
0.9 metres
Speed
40 knots (70 km/h)
Weapons
2X General Purpose Machine Gun

=== Patrol Interdiction Boat (4th Generation, PT Class) ===
A new, 4th generation Patrol Interdiction Boat (PIB) sourced from Lung Teh shipyard, Taiwan has entered service from 2015 onwards to progressively replace the 1st generation PT patrol craft. The first vessel was commissioned on 21 July 2015. A total of 11 boats would be acquired.

Ships
- Atlantic Ray (PT68)
- Southern Ray (PT69)
- Blackedge Ray (PT70)
- Sharpnose Ray (PT71)
- Whiptail Ray (PT72)
- Roughback Ray (PT73)
- Porcupine Ray (PT74)
- Cowtail Ray (PT75)
- Brown Ray (PT76)
- Honeycomb Ray (PT77)
- Smalleye Ray (PT78)
Length
18 ~ 19 metres
Beam
?
Draft
?
Speed
More than 45 knots (80 km/h)
Weapons
1 X 0.5 inch machine gun, mounted on RAFAEL'S Mini-Typhoon Remote Weapon System

=== Patrol Craft (5th Generation, PT Class) ===
On 3 March 2020, Minister for Home Affairs K. Shanmugam announced the acquisition of the 5th generation patrol vessels. A total of 24 vessels will be acquired to replace 12 of the existing 3rd generation patrol vessels and to increase the fleet.

The 5th generation patrol vessels will be acquired from ST Engineering Marine and are derived from the Super Swift series fast patrol vessels (FPB).

Ships
- TBC

Length
23 metres
Beam
6.25 metres
Draft
1 metres
Speed
Faster than 55 knots (100 km/h)
Engine
Rolls Royce

=== New Generation Patrol Craft (PC Class) ===
The New Generation Patrol Craft, also known as the Fast Response Craft, were delivered from the year 2002. There are currently 32 in active service. Even-numbered craft are based in Loyang Base, while odd-numbered craft are in Lim Chu Kang.

Ships
- Tiger Ray (PC201)
- PC202
- Blacktail (PC203)
- Kob (PC204)
- PC205
- Rock Cod (PC206)
- PC207
- Slinger (PC208)
- PC209
- Sailfish (PC210)
- PC211
- Snoek (PC212)
- PC213
- PC214
- PC215
- PC216
- PC217
- Leopard Puffer (PC218)
- PC219
- Silver Angel (PC220)
- PC221
- PC222
- PC223
- Guinean (PC224)
- Spotted Bass (PC225)
- Sawtooth (PC226)
- PC227
- Blackspot (PC228)
- PC229
- PC230
- PC231
- Pickhandle (PC232)

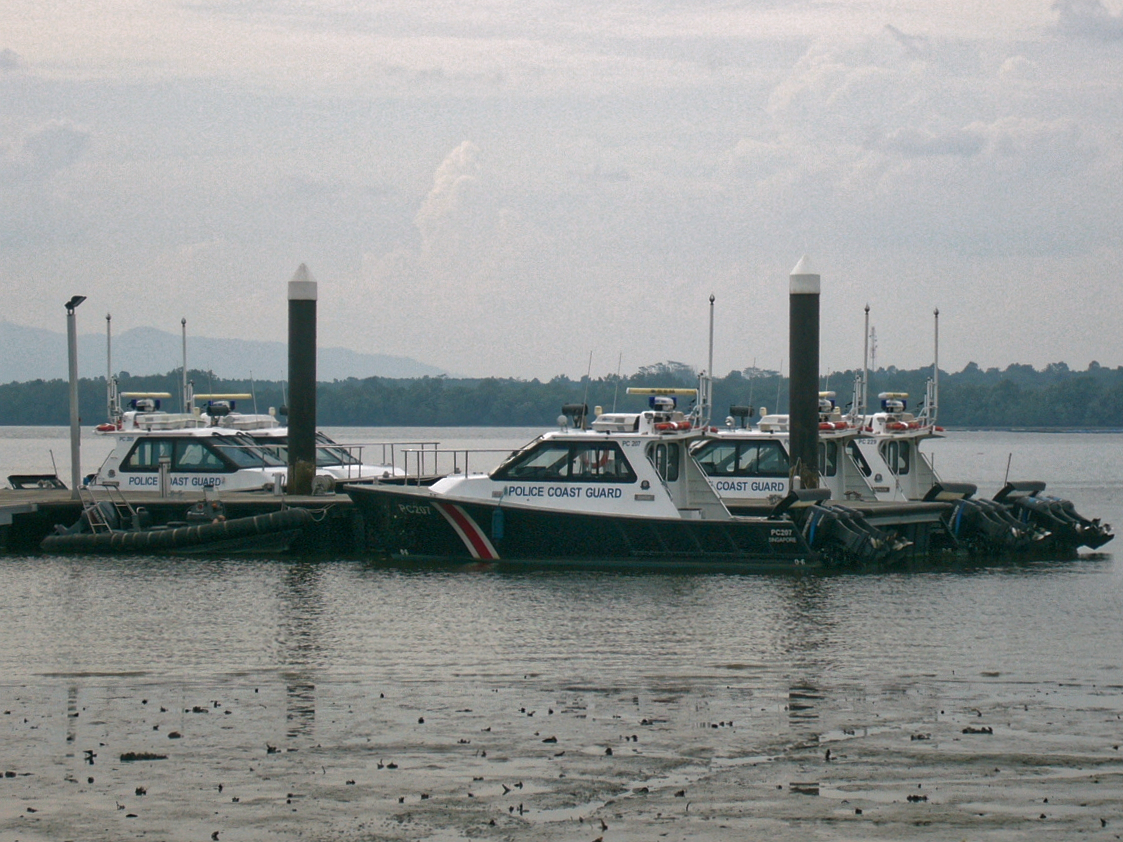
Patrol craft based at Lim Chu Kang in 2006

Length
11.5 metres
Beam
3.4 metres
Draft
0.5 metres
Speed
40 knots (70 km/h)

=== Interceptor Craft (2nd Generation PK Class) ===
A new, 2nd generation PK interceptor was ordered from Lung Teh shipyard, and commissioned in 2015.

Ships
- White Marlin (PK 21)
- Silver Marlin (PK 22)
- Striped Marlin (PK 23)
- Black Marlin (PK 24)
- Blue Marlin (PK 25)
- Jumping Marlin (PK 26)

Length
15.05 metres
Beam
2.7 metres
Draft
1.6 metres
Speed
55 knots (100 km/h)
Engine

=== Interceptor Craft (2nd Generation, PJ Class) ===
In addition to the PK class, the Special Task Squadron also operates the second generation PJ Class that are meant for shallow water operations.

Ships
- PJ11
- PJ12
- PJ13

Length
9.4 metres
Beam
3.1 metres
Draft
0.45 metres
Speed
45 knots (80 km/h)
Engine
2 x outboard motor

=== Other ===
The Police Coast Guard also operates two Marina Reservoir Patrol Boats (MRPB), named “Archerfish” (PC1) and “Tigerfish” (PC4) which were acquired in 2016 for patrols along the Singapore/Kallang rivers for internal security operations. These replaced earlier PJ class RHIBS which were in service for more than 30 years.

=== Unmanned Surface Vessels (USV) ===
The Police Coast Guard has been experimenting with unmanned surface vessels (USV) since the mid 2010s. The unmanned surface vessel system tested in 2017 consist of an autonomous vessel and a control ship (Tide Hunter) where the USV operator resides.

== Decommissioned vessels ==
=== Historical vessels ===
During the 1970s and 1980s, the Marine Police operated a number of vessels, which included the wooden hull PA and PB class patrol vessels and the steel hull PX class patrol vessels, which were replaced by the PT class, 1st Generation from the mid 1980s onwards.

=== Patrol Craft (1st Generation, PT Class) ===
The oldest generation of Patrol Craft in PCG service were built in 1984. Odd numbered craft are based in Gul Base and even numbered craft are based in Brani. The first generation Patrol Craft are scheduled to be replaced by the 4th generation Patrol Craft from 2015 onwards. PT5 and PT11 were decommissioned and sold via auction on 29 October 2014.

A single PT class patrol boat, PT8 Mangove Jack was preserved at Pasir Ris Town Park as part of the Nexus Youth Hub.

Ships
- Amberjack (PT1)
- Salmon (PT2)
- Tuna (PT3)
- Coral Cod (PT4)
- Cosby (PT5)
- Dolphin (PT6)
- Leatherjacket (PT7)
- Mangrove Jack (PT8)
- Oscar (PT9)
- Pari Burong (PT10)
- Piranha (PT11)
Displacement
20 tonnes
Length
14.54 metres
Beam
4.23 metres
Draft
1.2 metres
Speed
30 knots (60 km/h)
Weapons
General Purpose Machine Gun

=== Patrol Craft (2nd Generation, PT Class) ===
The second generation of Patrol Craft were built between 1987 and 1989, including the two Command Boats. Another four boats are operated by the Immigration and Checkpoints Authority. Odd-numbered craft are based in Gul base.

Ships
- Porpoise (PT12)
- Hardyhead (PT13)
- PT14
- Todak (PT15)
- PT16
- PT17
- Thread Fin (PT18)
- Dorado (PT19)~ decommissioned
Length
14.8 metres
Beam
4.23 metres
Draft
1.2 metres
Speed
30 knots (60 km/h)
Weapons
General Purpose Machine Gun

=== Interceptor Craft (1st Generation PK Class) ===
There were two types of the 1st generation PK interceptor craft, with the first delivered in 1995 by Green Bay Marine and 2nd Gen delivered by North shipyard. The first type was a high speed design that featured Mercury inboard motors while the second type (six boats) had a taller profile with outboard motors and was ordered in 1999 and delivered by 2001. and officially launched on 29 January 2000. The second type was originally intended to be the second generation interceptor craft but were not considered a success and was relegated to normal patrol duties and renamed into the PC class. A single vessel, PK/PC 23 was rebadged and operates as a Marine Command Vessel (MCV) under the Singapore Civil Defence Force's Marine Command for a shortwhile.

Ships
- Sailfish (PK10)
- Spearfish (PK20)
- White Marlin (PK 21) - Rebadged to PC121
- Silver Marlin (PK 22) - Rebadged to PC122
- Striped Marlin (PK 23) - Rebaged to PC123
- Black Marlin (PK 24) - Rebadged to PC124
- Blue Marlin (PK 25) - Rebadged to PC125
- Jumping Marlin (PK 26) - Rebadged to PC126
- Billfish (PK30)
- Swordfish (PK40)
- Spikefish (PK50)

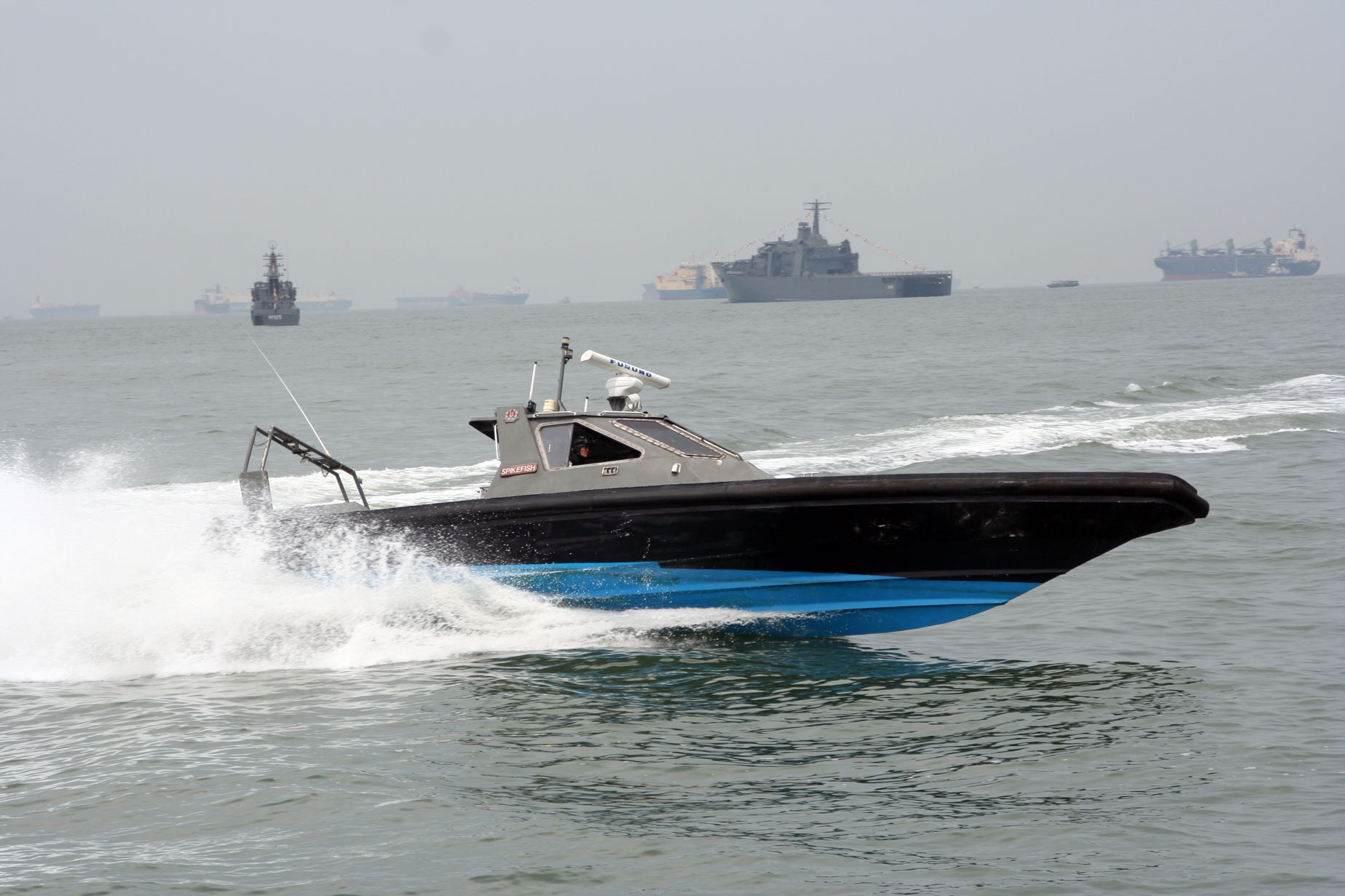
An Interceptor Craft, Spikefish (PK50), from the Special Task Squadron demonstrating its capabilities during a maritime exercise mockup display as part of the 2005 National Day Parade celebrations

Length
12 metres (14 metres for type 2/PC class)
Beam
3.6 metres (2.7 metres for type 2/PC class)
Draft
0.8 metres (1.5 metres for type 2/PC class)
Speed
50 knots (90 km/h)
Weapons
General Purpose Machine Gun

=== Coastal Patrol Craft (PH Class) ===
The PCG operated a fleet of 12 former Swift-class Coastal Patrol Craft (CPC). The craft were upgraded and handed over by the Republic of Singapore Navy (RSN), with the first four officially handed over on 7 May 1993 another four on 3 June 1994, and the last four on 22 January 1997 as part of the formation of the Police Coast Guard Coastal Patrol Squadron. The CPCs were built between 1979 and 1980, but continued service for over two decades while a proper replacement was being sourced. Five of the decommissioned vessels were transferred to the Indonesian Marine Police (POLAIR) on 9 February 2012.

Ships
- Hammerhead Shark (PH50)
- Mako Shark (PH51)
- White Shark (PH52)
- Blue Shark (PH53)
- Tiger Shark (PH54)
- Basking Shark (PH55)
- Sandbar Shark (PH56)
- Thresher Shark (PH57)
- Whitetip Shark (PH58)
- Blacktip Shark (PH59)
- Goblin Shark (PH60)
- School Shark (PH61)
Displacement
45.7 tonnes
Length
22.7 metres
Beam
6.2 metres
Draft
1.6 metres
Speed
20 knots (37 km/h)
Weapons
Oerlikon 20 mm cannon, 2 x 0.5" Browning Machine Gun
Small Arms
Carbine, HK5 & Pistol.

=== Rigid-hulled Inflatable Boats (PJ Class) ===
The PJ Class was a class of rigid-hulled inflatable boat for cruising upriver and large drains and introduced in 1997. These were retired in favor of the Marina Reservoir Patrol Boats (MRPB).

Ships
- PJ1
- PJ2
- PJ3
- PJ4
Length
6.0 metres
Beam
2.5 metres
Draft
0.8 metres
Speed
40 knots (70 km/h)

== Collaborations ==
The PCG has engaged in joint operations with the Republic of Singapore Navy (RSN) since the 1990s and is still ongoing with strong mutual ties, such as the joint actions of the RSN's 180 Squadron (comprising personnel of the Navy's Accompanying Sea Security Team, better known as ASSeT) and the PCG (with several officers trained and selected to do joint boarding operations with their Navy ASSeT counterparts) in boarding key vital and important cargo vessels (such as LNG/LPG carrier ships or oil tankers) in Singapore's territorial waters to protect them from any terrorist activity, such as hijacking actions or bombing attacks, and to ensure vessels have safe passage, as well as with foreign agencies. Alliances were forged with the Royal Malaysian Police Marine Operations Force and the TNI-AL (Indonesian Navy). It is involved in the annual Cooperation Afloat Readiness and Training (CARAT) programme with the United States Coast Guard, the RSN, and five other Southeast Asian countries. In 2001, it was involved in a joint anti-illegal migrant operation with the Japan Coast Guard in Kanazawa. The PCG also has collaborations with the Republic of Korea Coast Guard and makes regular contacts with the Hong Kong Police Force's Marine Region through a reciprocal attachment programme.

The PCG has collaborated with the National Police Cadet Corps to establish sea units in secondary schools. The first two units were set up in Anglo-Chinese School (Independent) and Springfield Secondary School in 2002, with the PCG's pool of reservists and Volunteer Special Constabulary officers providing training for the cadets. The first all-girls sea unit was set up in Raffles Girls' School (Secondary) in 2006. The PCG also supports the Special Tactics and Rescue Unit’s maritime assault capability, which was launched on 2 February 2005.
