= ICMS Singapore =

Singapore court software

The Integrated Case Management System (ICMS Singapore) is an internet-based system by the State Courts of Singapore. ICMS enables all criminal proceedings within the State Courts of Singapore to be conducted in an electronic environment using digital documents.

== ICMS for Government Agencies ==
All Singapore government agencies involved in criminal justice system are linked to the ICMS. The agencies can do the following process with the State Courts of Singapore directly from their office without a courthouse visit. These process include, criminal prosecutions, file applications and receive court orders.
